= Border reivers =

1200s–1600s raiders along the Anglo-Scottish border

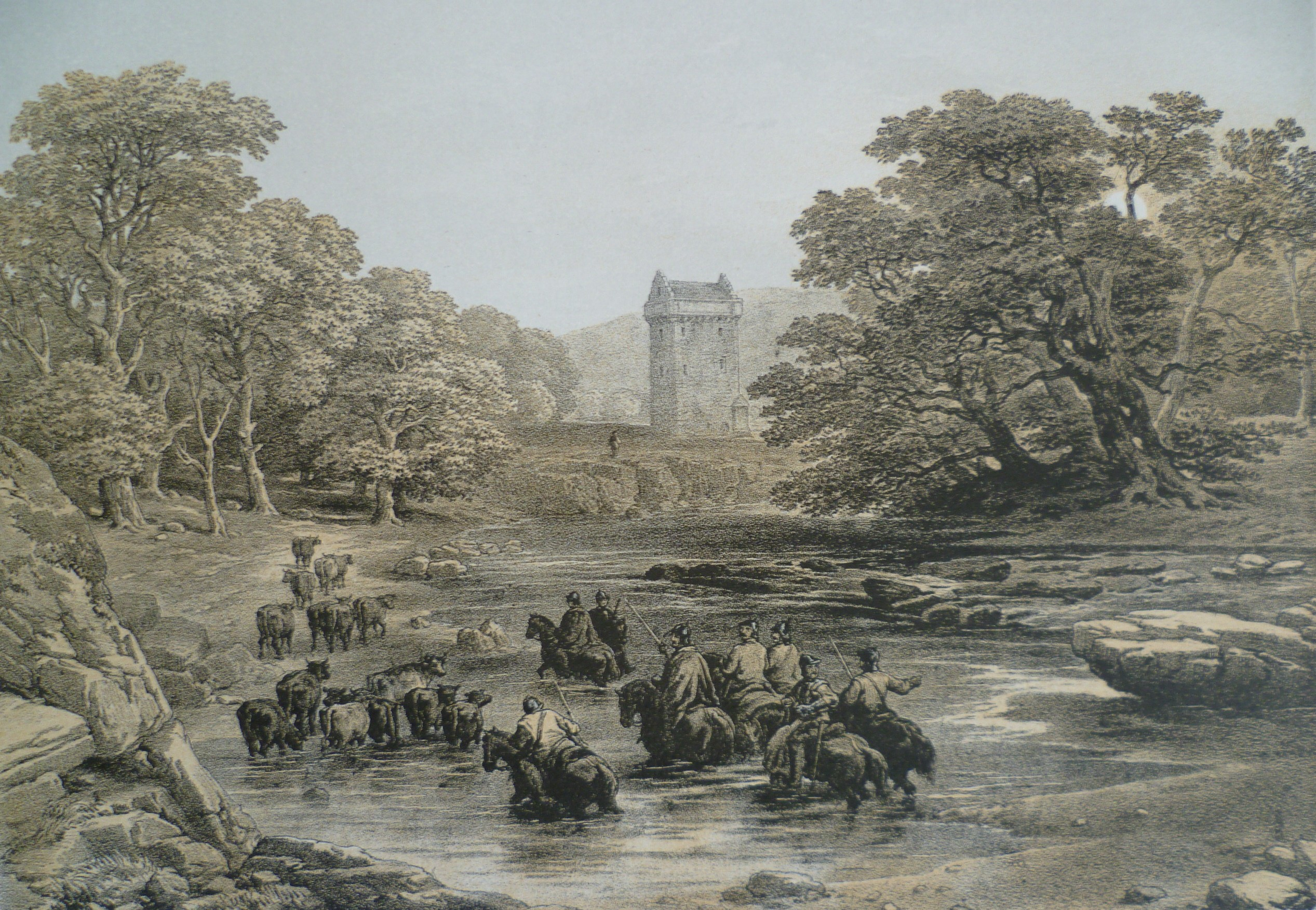
Reivers at Gilnockie Tower in Dumfries and Galloway, Scotland, from a 19th-century print

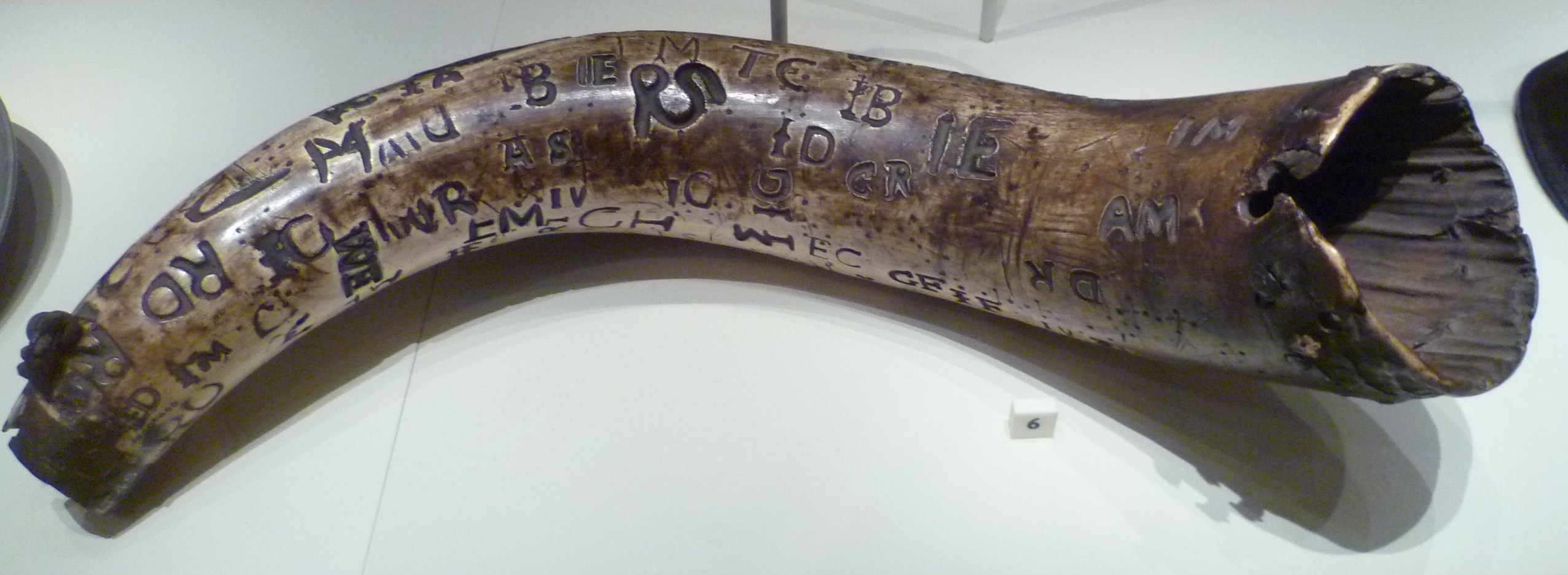
Notorious raider Walter Scott of Harden's horn, noted in a poem called "The Reiver's Wedding" by Sir Walter Scott. It reads in part: "He took a bugle frae his side,/With names carved o'er and o'er,/Full many a chief of meikle pride,/That Border bugle bore."

Border reivers were raiders along the Anglo-Scottish border. They included both English and Scottish people, and they raided the entire border country without regard to their victims' nationality. They operated in a culture of legalised raiding and feuding. Their heyday was in the last hundred years of their existence, during the time of the House of Stuart in the Kingdom of Scotland and the House of Tudor in the Kingdom of England.

The historian G. M. Trevelyan summed up Border society by writing:

Like the Homeric Greeks, the Borderers were cruel and barbarous men, slaying each other like beasts of the forest, but high in pride and honour and rough faithfulness.

Amidst centuries of lawlessness, poverty and low-intensity conflict, compounded by significant invasions along the Anglo-Scottish frontier, familial groups gradually coalesced into organised units of common defence and offence based on kinship, giving rise to what would later be formalised as the 'Surnames.' The reivers emerged between 1350 and 1450, with their activities reaching their height in the 16th century during the Tudor period in England and the late Stewart period in Scotland. Reiving was a matter of subsistence for the borderer. They were infamous for raiding, blood feuds, (Note: The word "feud" appears to have originated in the Borders during the Middle Ages. See: Niles, John D. “The Myth of the Feud in Anglo-Saxon England.” The Journal of English and Germanic Philology, vol. 114, no. 2, 2015, p.171) eliciting protection money or taking hostages (blackmail), where justice was frequently negotiated through arbitration at Truce Days rather than enforced and mandated by state law. Often the dividing line between officially sanctioned raiding and independent raiding was not clear. Many crimes, such as theft and feuding, were treated with less severity due to the ancient customs and culture of the Borderlands, which had evolved over centuries to tolerate and codify such practices in the March law.

Although less well-known than Highlanders in Scotland, whom they met and defeated in battle on occasion, the border reivers played a significant role in shaping Anglo-Scottish relations. Their activities were a major factor in ongoing tensions between the two kingdoms, and their raids often had international repercussions. There is debate over how great their threat and the extent to which their raids were state-directed rather than purely opportunistic.

The culture of the border reivers, characterised by honour, close family bonds and self-defence, has been said to influence the culture of the Upland South in the United States. Many Borderers migrated as families to America, where their values are thought to have contributed significantly to the region's social structure and political ideologies, with echoes of their influence persisting even today.

== Etymology ==
Reive, a noun meaning raid, comes from the Middle English (Scots) reifen. The verb reave meaning "plunder, rob", a closely related word, comes from the Middle English reven. There also exists a Northumbrian and Scots verb reifen. All three derive from Old English rēafian which means "to rob, plunder, pillage". Variants of these words were used in the Borders in the later Middle Ages.

The earliest use of the combined term "border reiver" appears to be by Sir Walter Scott in his anthology Minstrelsy of the Scottish Border. George Ridpath (1716?–1772), the author of posthumously published The Border-History of England and Scotland, deduced from the earliest times to the union of the two crowns (London, 1776), referred not to 'border reivers' but only to banditti.

=== Contemporary names ===
In the High Middle Ages, an outlaw was euphemistically known on the Borders as a "wolf" or a "bearer of the wolf's head". Later, outlaws were referred to as 'broken men.'

A 1443 source notes that "a garyson of refars" (reivers) being housed in Coldingham Priory were responsible for the theft of two thousand sheep. Those living in Redesdale and Tynedale were referred to as Highlanders by contemporary sources; by others pejoratively known at the time as the "Busy Gap Rogues" after being famed for spreading out from an isolated hole in Hadrian's Wall near Housesteads. The inhabitants of Teviotdale and the notorious Liddesdale were referred to as "Limmers". The Border reivers were also referred to as bandits (or bandis in Middle Scots) in some contemporary sources.

== Background ==
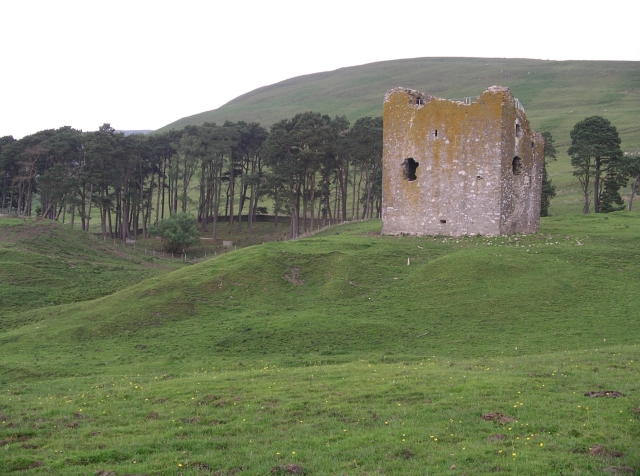
Dryhope Tower near Selkirk in Scotland, built in the 1500s for protection against the reivers

=== Governance, culture and territoriality of the Anglo-Scottish frontier ===
The Anglo-Scottish borders were shaped by centuries of territorial disputes, cultural integration, and overlapping systems of governance, resulting in one of the most administratively complex regions of medieval Britain.

The traditional narrative places the Battle of Carham in 1018 as a pivotal moment when Scottish forces secured control over Lothian, marking a fundamental shift in the northern boundary of England. However, this interpretation is subject to debate. Some historians question whether the loss of Lothian to Scotland can be definitively dated to 1018, with a range of alternative timelines proposed or whether the battle had any real significance.

==== Lothian ====
Contemporary evidence suggests the gradual establishment of Scottish authority over Lothian and the Borders, marked by the consolidation of continuous royal control around the same time as the Norman Conquest, West Lothian and Midlothian likely dates between Máel Coluim III’s accession in 1058 and the death of his son Edgar in 1107. (Note: An older source says that Edgar recognised William II as Overlord in Lothian. (Mack, J. L. (1926). The border line: From the Solway to the North Sea, along the marches of Scotland and England (New and revised ed.). Oliver and Boyd, p7.) The continued ambiguity in the possession of Lothian is shown in the Peterborough Chronicle in 1091: "Then the king, Malcolm, heard that he would he sought out with an army, he went with his army out of Scotland into Lothian in England and bided there." (Note: Original text: þa ða se cyng Melcolm gehyrde þæt hine man mid fyrde secean wolde. he for mid his fyrde ut of Scotlande into Loðene on Englaland þær abad. - Anglo-Saxon Chronicle Laud Chronicle (1091)) Into the late 11th century, Lothian was still regarded as one of England's unshired regions, alongside Northumberland, Cumberland, and Westmorland.

East Lothian saw consolidation under Máel Coluim III by 1093, with Edgar firmly establishing authority by 1107. Berwickshire (Merse) was under Máel Coluim III's rule, with Edgar solidifying control around 1100. Teviotdale (Roxburghshire) and Tweeddale fell under continuous Scottish control from 1113 during David I’s tenure. Annandale came under Robert de Brus, 1st Lord of Annandale between 1113 and 1124 as a vassal of David I, having been conferred upon him by Henry I of England. According to Alistair Moffat, by 1153, the Tweed Valley had been thoroughly feudalised. Not all land was giving to Norman incomers – there is at least one known Anglo-Scandinavian recorded as giving a land charter in Scotland.

==== Strathclyde ====
The Kingdom of Strathclyde (Note: ‘Kingdom of Strathclyde’ is an exonym; there is no good evidence for how the inhabitants referred to their own polity. See: Edmonds, F. (2014). "The Emergence and Transformation of Medieval Cumbria". The Scottish Historical Review, 93(237), pp. 195–216.) appears to have collapsed under pressure from both the Gall-Goídil and the expanding Earldom of Bamburgh, (Note: Similar to 'Kingdom of Strathclyde', it is not clear what we call the 'Earldom of Bamburgh' as there is no known endonym for the polity. It is frequently confused with the larger polity of Northumbria to the south. See McGuigan, N. (2018), "Bamburgh and the Northern English Realm: Understanding the Dominion of Uhtred", in McGuigan, N. & Woolf, A. (eds.), The Battle of Carham: A Thousand Years On, Edinburgh, pp. 95–150) and the Kingdom of Alba, by the turn of the twelfth century. Following the decline of Northumbrian authority inland, the Cumbric (Note: Later on, in the Scottish borders, there was a class of servile fieldworkers known as the 'Cumerlach', a term that derived from Cymry the Welsh word for the Welsh people. See Moffat, A. (2002). The Borders: A History of the Borders from Earliest Times. Deerpark Press, p138) lands north of the Solway Firth were absorbed into what was emerging as the Kingdom of Scotland. In the wake of this fragmentation, opportunistic Norman adventurers established their own lordships in south-west of Scotland.

The twelfth century saw the Normanisation of the Scottish nobility, as Norman lords, brought in by David I of Scotland, introduced new complexities of Norman colonisation in the Borderlands. Many of these lords held land in England and brought in Anglo-Saxon tenants from their estates south of the border.

==== Northumbria ====
South of the Tweed, the precise date of the so-called Earldom of Bamburgh's fall remains uncertain, though it likely occurred c. 1100, amid converging pressures from southward Scottish expansion and northward Norman consolidation following William I's invasion of England. In the winter of 1069–70, the Normans systematically burned and looted the north of England in response to rebellion that included the Anglo-Saxon Earl of Northumberland, Gospatric, in an event known as the Harrying of the North. Neither Northumberland, County Durham, Cumberland nor Westmorland were surveyed in the Domesday Book in 1085.

There are strong indications that the area north of the Tyne remained outside effective Norman control until at least 1090s, with evidence suggesting the persistence of an independent Anglian polity or organised resistance until the early 12th century. Elsewhere it is said that the process of Norman conquest of Northumbria began in 1096 and colonisation was completed by 1135.

==== Cumbria ====
Following the Norman Conquest, the Anglo-Scottish border in the west remained ambiguous. William Rufus in 1090 expelled Dolfin of Carlisle, a possible descendant of the Anglo-Saxon Earls of Northumbria, from Cumberland and fortified Carlisle to secure the region. It is suggested by some that Cumbria was ceded by Tostig to Máel Coluim III in the 1060s, and that Dolfin may have been installed by Máel Coluim III. Cumberland was extensively colonised by Norman adventurers, who also forcefully resettled Danes and Anglo-Saxons from the south.

==== The Anarchy ====
However, during the period of civil war known as The Anarchy (1135–1153), David I of Scotland exploited the instability and advanced southward into northern England. In the Second Treaty of Durham (1139), King Stephen granted the Earldom of Northumbria: encompassing Carlisle, Cumberland, Westmorland, and Lancashire north of the Ribble to David's son, Prince Henry. These territories were later reclaimed, and David's successor, Malcolm IV, was forced to cede them. Since then, the Anglo-Scottish border has remained largely unchanged, with only minor adjustments. The Anglo-Scottish Border only began to formalise by 1237 in the Treaty of York.

==== Complex and dual identities ====
Land ownership and governance in the Anglo-Scottish border region during the 12th and 13th centuries were shaped by a highly mixed population and the ruling elite was predominantly composed of Norman, Flemish, and Breton incomers; many of which had a shared culture and land on both sides of the border.

These newcomers were granted lands and titles as knights and lords, establishing castles and vast demesnes, some straddling the ambiguous Anglo-Scottish frontier during the Wars of Scottish Independence; which later fuelled legal disputes and feuding over land and jurisdiction. The Borderlands, home to Early Scots, Northumbrians, Norse, Brythonic and Gaelic communities, ultimately fell under the control of a newly established foreign ruling class.

The integration of these groups under predominantly Norman, Flemish, and Breton lords across the border introduced a dual identity and a new layer of governance that often clashed with local traditions, further complicating loyalties and creating a fragmented political landscape. The unique March Law can be seen as an example of a distinct regional culture, different from both England and Scotland. The Armstrongs of Liddesdale, a powerful Scottish clan rooted in 13th and 14th-century English settlement, exhibited this dual identity, earning the notorious moniker "Evil Inglis" well into the 16th century due to their lawless ways. Similarly Grahams were reputed to identify as either Scottish or English whenever it suited them. Even into the 14th and 15th centuries, those living in Teviotdale who held English allegiance would occasionally appeal to the King of England to settle their disputes. According to late Tudor estimates, Scots comprised up to a third of those living within ten miles of the frontier in England.

===== Border Identity =====
The Wars of Scottish Independence played a key role in this transformation of the Borders, fostering and forcing a growing sense of national belonging that extended across social, cultural and linguistic groups. However, alongside this burgeoning national identity, a shared border identity also emerged, rooted in the unique cultural and legal practices of the region. This Borderer identity was by degree by how close they were to border and politically to their respective centres of power. It was noted in contemporaneous sources from 14th Century at that Borderers shared the same dialect across frontier and were indistinguishable on the battlefield. Government officials repeatedly expressed concerns that the Borderers often collaborated in ways that undermined law and order in the region and frequently married across the border despite prohibitions.

This shared identity coexisted with a lingering sense of Otherness, (Note: The perception of the Otherness of the Borders is shown in Canterbury Tales within The Man of Law's Tale, and in Gower's earlier "Tale of Constance", with the story of a Roman princess being shipwrecked on the Northumberland Coast being a strange and savage land. See See England's Northern Frontier by Jackson W. Armstrong (2021), p94) as the borders remained distinct from the centralised identities of both nations, shaped by their unique history and violent reputation, and the persistent influence of local loyalties. Borderers were not trusted enough to man the local garrisons. Despite having a distinct culture compared to those beyond the border frontier, there were still notable differences in the mid-16th century between the inhabitants of Tynedale and those of Redesdale, even though both liberties lay next to each other in the Cheviot highlands. This shared Border identity and feelings of Otherness persisted throughout the 16th century. Nevertheless, according to the historian Andy King, they were a Scots or English first and a Borderer second.

=== Disputed territory ===
The border defined in the aforementioned Treaty of York (1237) was only loosely specified, being understood to extend from the Solway Firth to the Tweed. By 1245, territorial disputes remained unresolved, as demonstrated in a case involving Hugh de Bolbec, a Northumbrian knight. A meeting near Carham on the Tweed attempted to establish "the true and ancient marches between the two kingdoms". Six knights from each side were appointed to walk the border line, but the Scottish and English representatives disagreed at every step. A second attempt in 1246 expanded the parties to twelve knights per side, with additional servants and men-at-arms processing through the Tweed Valley, but it too ended without agreement.

A third effort involved 48 knights in 1249, who swore an oath to trace the border. The English knights proposed a line running from the confluence of Reddenburn and the Tweed, south to Tres Karras and Hopperichlawe (now lost), and then to Whitelaw Hill in the Cheviot Hills. However, the Scottish knights opposed this perambulation with threats, and tensions escalated. Lacking further resources to continue, the English knights unilaterally declared the defined line to be "the true and ancient marches and divisions", despite the lack of mutual agreement.

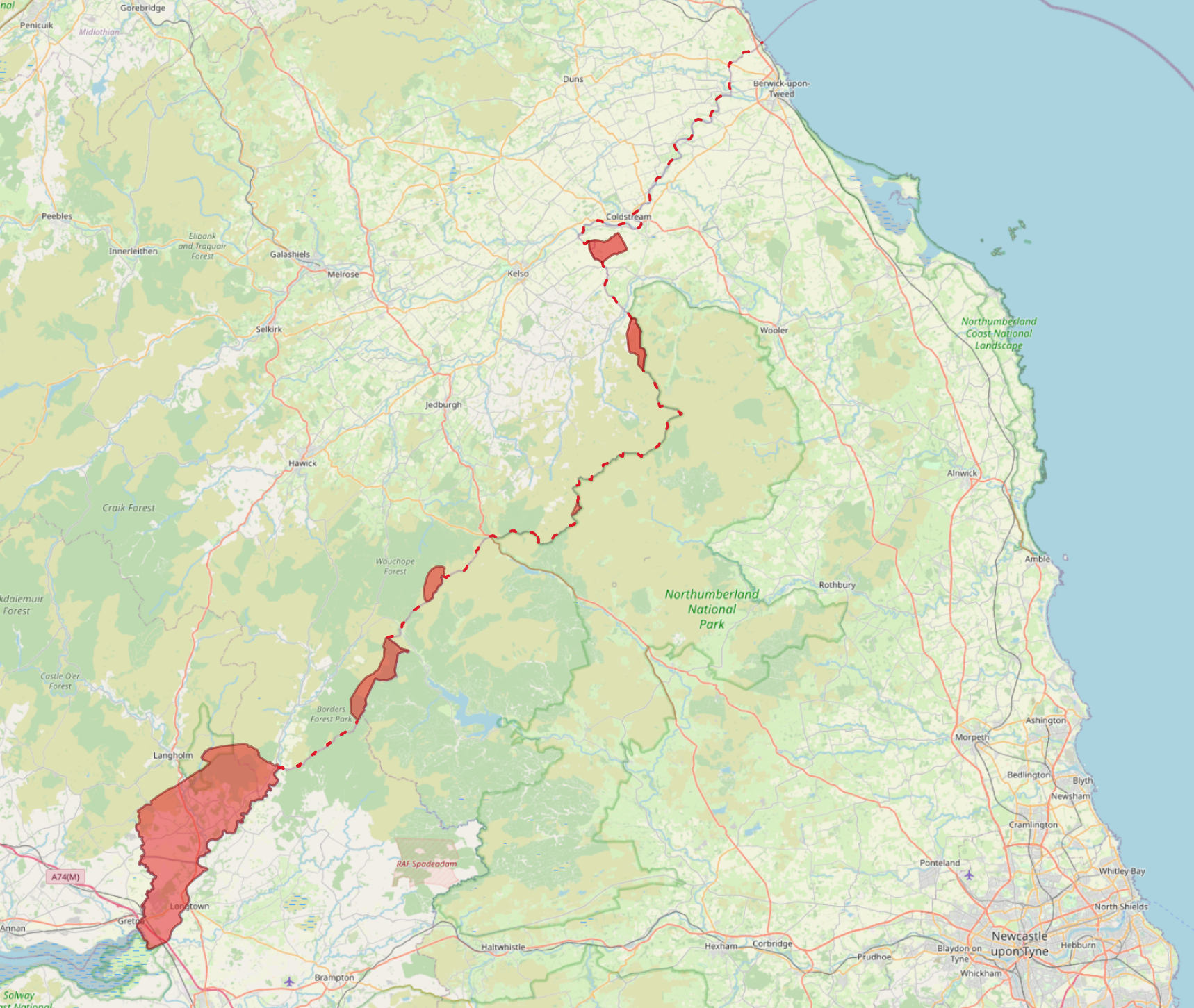
Anglo-Scottish Borderland: (De)batable Land and threiplands

Throughout the period, various territories remained disputed due to unresolved claims, particularly lands referred to as threiplands (Scots for "disputed lands"). There were five such lesser threiplands alongside the larger and more notorious Debatable Land, as illustrated in the accompanying image. The Debatable Land was an expansive terra nullius, first appeared late in records in 1449; but was believed to go back to 'tymis begane,' or at least the days of Robert the Bruce and the Treaty of Edinburgh–Northampton (1329). It lay between the rivers Esk and Sark, was the subject of contention until 1552, when its status was finally settled. Originally referred to as the "Batable Land", a term derived from its use as fertile grazing ground, the territory was notable for an agreement allowing both English and Scottish borderers to graze cattle during the day, despite prohibitions on permanent settlement.

Berwick-upon-Tweed, a strategically important town on the Anglo-Scottish border, changed hands fourteen times during the medieval period, with significant transfers in 1174, 1296, and 1318, and in 1378 it was reportedly captured from English governance by independent Scottish raiders. Its turbulent history culminated in 1482 when it was seized by Richard, Duke of Gloucester, and thereafter remained under English administration.

The Anglo-Scottish border was not fully demarcated until the mid-19th century, when the Ordnance Survey mapped the area in detail. Even as late as this period, some lands, such as Kirkholm Common, were still considered by locals to be threipland. Such confusion over where the border lay is evidenced by the Ordnance Survey moving the Border east in 1859 map and then moved back west in the 1896 map.

Other disputed areas were resolved through less formal means. The Ba Green (or Ba' Green or Ball Green) near Wark and Coldstream, a Scottish tract of land that curiously lies on the English side of the River Tweed, is one such example. This threipland became the subject of an annual game of football, whose result determined temporary control of the land. Over time, Coldstream's growing population allowed it to field far more players than Wark, leading to the land being informally absorbed into Scotland.

=== Overlapping powers: judicial, religious, and secular authority ===
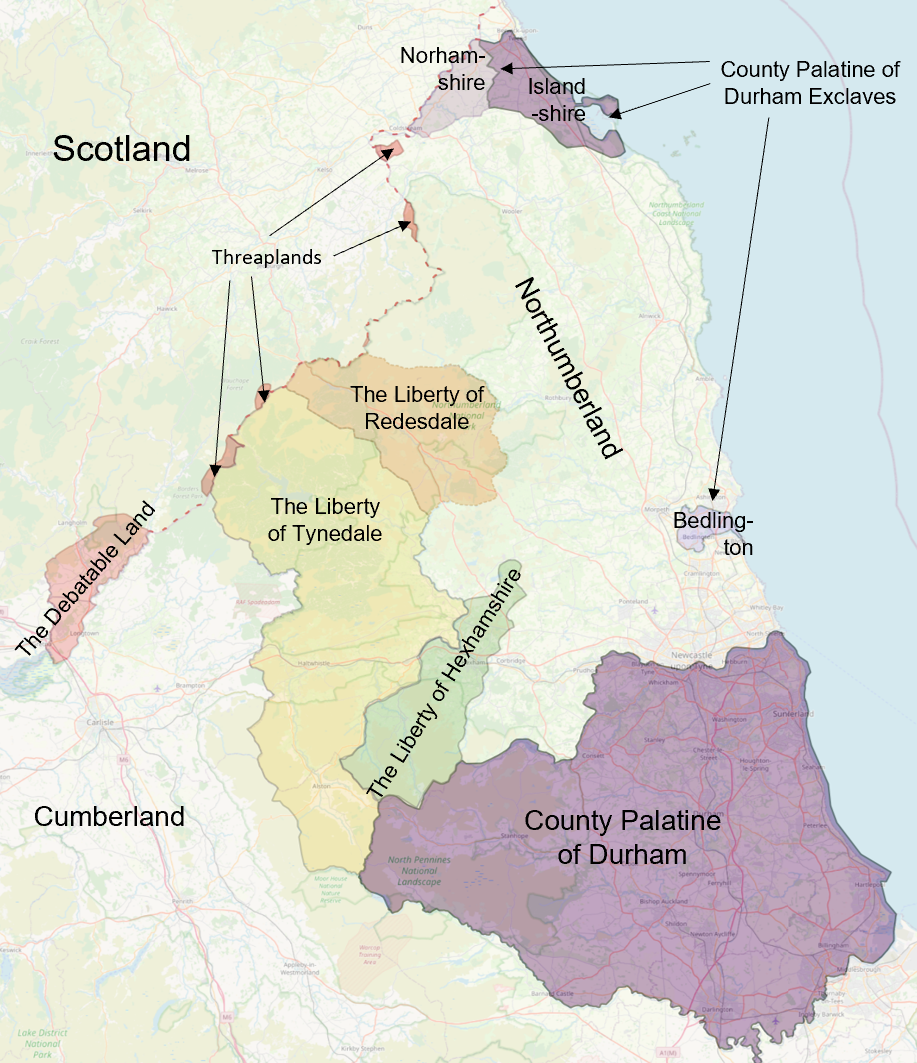
Map of the complex overlying secular and religious powers in the late medieval period Northumberland

The Anglo-Scottish Borders were marked by overlapping systems of administration and law, creating a patchwork of competing jurisdictions.

Secular liberties like Tynedale and Redesdale operated semi-independently, granting local lords significant autonomy to enforce laws and defend their territories. Robert de Umfraville, also known as "Robert-with-the-Beard," was granted the newly established Liberty of Redesdale in 1075, replacing the former Anglian lord, Mildraed. The Liberty of Tynedale, created in 1157, was governed by the monarch of Scotland as a fief of England until death of Alexander III, when it reverted to English rule. In 1414 the secular liberties were integrated into Common Law. The liberties were first incorporated into the shire of Northumberland during the reign of Henry VII and were later abolished entirely under Henry VIII. These secular liberties were frequently accused of, and shown to house troublemakers.

To note, Liddesdale, established in the late 12th century, was a rarity on the Scottish side, a regality functioning effectively as a secular liberty (Note: It may not have strictly acted as liberty into the 16th century, as in the same way as Liberty of Tynedale did so, because in 1495 Patrick Hepburn, 1st Earl of Bothwell, was fined £850 for misdoers pledged to him not turning up to court. See: ARMSTRONG, J. W. (2013). The Justice Ayre in the Border Sheriffdoms, 1493-1498. The Scottish Historical Review, 92(233), p17-18.), with its own keeper who generally, ex officio, also held the position of Captain of Hermitage Castle.

Religious influence was prominent in the liberty of Hexhamshire, governed by the Archbishops of York, and in the County Palatine of Durham (which included the exclaves of Norhamshire and Islandshire on the frontier), ruled by the Prince Bishops, who held powers comparable to those of a king, including raising armies and collecting taxes. The religious liberties fiercely resisted the encroachment of secular lawmen into their jurisdictions. There were also sanctuary churches where individuals fleeing justice were granted 37 days of protection before the church took further action. (Note: It wasn't only the Palatines of Durham and York who faced accusations of sheltering criminal activity. In 1384, the inhabitants of the Palatine of Cheshire were similarly accused of engaging in cattle-raiding across neighboring districts See: Lapsley, Gaillard Thomas. “A Study in English Border History.” The American Historical Review, vol. 5, no. 3, 1900, pp. 451. JSTOR, https://doi.org/10.2307/1835236. Accessed 8 Dec. 2025.)

The Percies of Alnwick, Earls of Northumberland (created in 1377), based in Alnwick, (Note: The Percies held considerable influence and loyalty amongst Northumbrians to the point that they compared to kings. See: Alastair J. MacDonald, "John Hardyng, Northumbrian Identity and the Scots," in North-East England in the Later Middle Ages, ed. Christian D. Liddy and Richard Britnell (Woodbridge: Boydell Press, 2005), p41-42) and the Nevilles of Raby, the Earls of Westmorland (created in 1397), were another major force, holding substantial military and administrative influence over the English far north. Most major noble lords were absent from the frontier, including the Nevilles. In Scotland, the only comparable noble house of the Percies was that of the Black Douglases, but their fall in 1455 left a power vacuum.

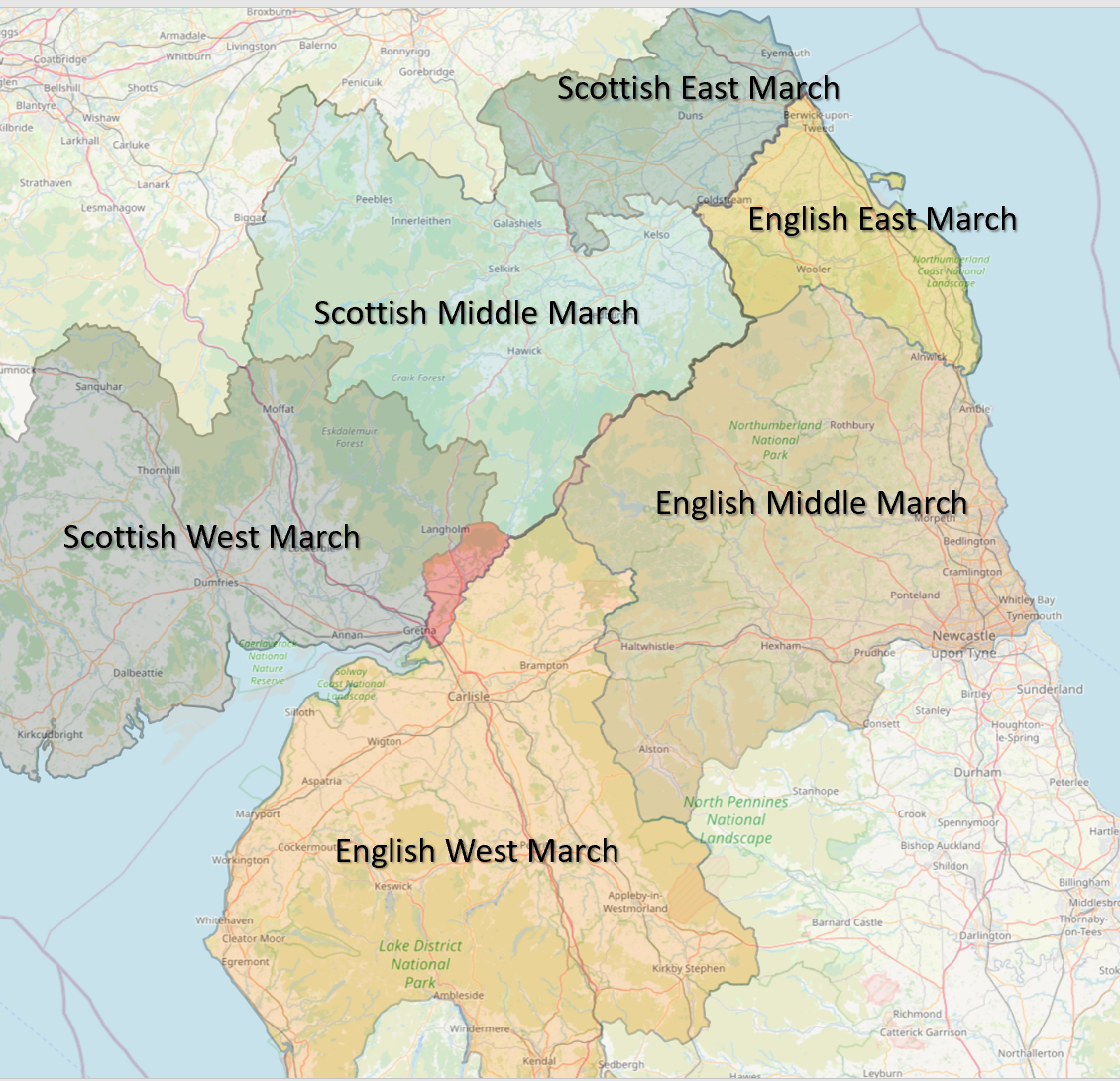
Anglo-Scottish Marches

Until 1345, at least on the English side there was one march; until at least 1381 when it became two with the death of the last Umfraville with the creation of the English West and East March, and then a Middle March, carved out of the English East March, first appeared in texts dating to the 1470s. For much of the late 16th Century, English Middle and East March operated as one. Historical analysis by Anne Cardew highlights that the standard textbook cartography of the Scottish East, Middle, and West Marches lacks definitive fifteenth-century documentation, suggesting that these neat geographic boundaries - presented in the map - may be a later construct from the late sixteenth century or beyond.

The legal framework of the region was equally fragmented, with March law addressing cross-border disputes and raids, while state law and ecclesiastical law functioned in parallel. The Liberties, both religious and secular, were repeatedly accused of being havens for outlaws. Disputes often arose between Wardens of the Marches, Keepers of the liberties, and local sheriffs, reflecting the constant struggle to impose order in this turbulent region. (Note: There was ambiguity how far English marches stretched south and there were some disputes between the Wardens and powers to the south of the Tyne and into Lancashire. See England's Northern Frontier by Jackson W. Armstrong (2021).)

While both England and Scotland had overlapping jurisdictions, Scottish regalities generally lacked the level of autonomy seen in English liberties. This difference arose because England had a more centralised system of governance, whereas Scotland's rule was more fragmented, with local polities retaining greater independence. Despite these differences, both nations faced persistent challenges in governing the borderlands, where local power dynamics frequently overruled central authority.

== The medieval Anglo-Scottish Borderlands ==
=== Hen Ogledd ===
The pervasive tradition of cattle raiding and endemic violence in the Border region appears to have roots that extend deep into its history. The earliest references to such behaviour appear in the Old Welsh (Hen Ogledd) poems attributed to bards such as Taliesin, Aneirin, and Llywarch Hen, which describe battles and raids in the early medieval period of what is now the Anglo-Scottish Borders. These poetic accounts hint at a long-standing culture of raiding and conflict in the northern British territories.

I roared, my breast full of tumult,
Lance on my shoulder, shield in my hand,
When Goddeu and Rheged were ranged for war,
I saw a man who was raiding cattle -
Famous dragon, unique trampler.

According to Jocelin of Furness, when St Kentigern arrived in the Carlisle area, he discovered that the people living up in the mountains were either practising pagan idolatry or had completely forgotten Christian law.

Modern genetic studies support the idea of continuity in the Borders region, showing that its population clusters separately from both broader Scottish and English genetic groups. There is evidence of continued settlement patterns in the Anglo-Scottish Borders, suggesting a continuity of territorial practices from the pre-Anglo-Saxon period. This distinction aligns with the historical role of the Borders as a cultural and geographical transitional zone and is consistent with the region's heritage, tracing back to the Brythonic-speaking kingdoms of Gododdin and Rheged.

=== March law ===
The formulation of March law, Leges Marchiarum, followed a meeting in 1248 between six English and six Scottish knights, first formally codified in 1249. Between 1249 and 1596, the laws of the Marches were reviewed and recodified on at least eight occasions.

This body of law seems to have developed over time and based on pre-existing customs. It addressed not only diplomatic relations between England and Scotland but also sought to regulate banditry, cross-border smuggling, and feuding. Its provisions included the return of fugitives, the recovery of debts, and the production of accused parties at designated trysting places along the border, such as Reddenburn near Kelso. These trysting places served as neutral meeting points for resolving disputes under the framework of March law, and pre-date the compilation of Leges Marchiarum.

The legal traditions referenced in these codes draw upon "the ancient laws and customs of the land," and some of the language, such as "handwarsil" and "manbote," suggests Anglo-Saxon origins. Other archaic aspects of the law included trial by combat (Note: Trial by combat or 'handwarsil' appeared to largely died out in the 13th century elsewhere in England and Scotland, and in the march lands by the mid-15th century. See England's Northern Frontier by Jackson W. Armstrong (2021), p94) and legalised feuds. Similarly, the phrase "double and sawfey" reflects a compensation formula also found in the Laws of Hywel Dda, with sawfey likely derived from the Welsh sarhaed, meaning 'a fine for injury', and suggests March law may go back to at least the Brythonic Kingdom of Strathclyde and Northumbria. Moffat traces the origins of Border law to the Borders’ Celtic past. A very similar set of laws to the Leges Marchiarum, addressing cross-border theft, including cattle-raiding, and murder and including the use of oaths and peace hostages, and compensation can be found in the Ordinance Concerning the Dunsæte (c. 11th century), which governed relations between a West Saxon community, Dunsæte, and a Welsh community, Wentsæte (likely the Kingdom of Gwent). Similar laws that regulated blood-feud, kinship revenge and compensation continued in Scotland until the Early modern period.

March law itself refers to the laws as originating "from a time which memory does not exist." However, the extent to which these laws derive from pre-Norman customs remains a topic of scholarly debate.

== Wars of Scottish Independence ==
An earlier rendition of banditry may have been the bands of armed men who first appeared on the Borders in the early 14th century, then known as the Schavaldours (also spelled shavaldour, shavaldor, or shavaldor) during the unstable rule of Edward II of England. The term was first recorded in 1313, when Richard de Kellawe, then Bishop of Durham, requested to be excused from levying any money from the goods of the parson of Whickham, citing the damage caused by "Schavadours and plunderers." The Schavaldours, like the later (and anachronistically named) Border reivers, were often pressed into service during cross-border wars, such as those in 1350.

The problem of banditry grew worse following Edward II's loss at the Battle of Bannockburn in 1314 and appeared to further worsen after a severe famine in 1315–1317 and a failed campaign in 1322. The anarchy that followed created conditions where both organised and independent bands of Scottish armed men, along with opportunistic English bands, raided as far as Yorkshire, devastating the land not only through plunder but also widespread burning. While the term 'Schalvadours' disappears from records by the late 14th century, the violence and lawlessness that characterised the Border region continued for centuries.

=== Border warfare and the rise of Surnames ===
The Border reivers emerged between the end of the First Scottish War of Independence (Note: Even before the Wars of Independence it appears banditry and organised crime was not rare in the Borders. Ralph Robson, The English Highland Clans, (Edinburgh: John Donald Publishers, 1989), p16-17) and the Wars of the Roses, as fortified defences in England began to appear during this period. It was during this turbulent period that Surnames and heidsmen likely emerged as kin-based leaders who organised defence, raids, and rudimentary social order amid endemic warfare and the collapse of traditional authority.

Edward II gave the men in the liberties of Tynedale and Redesdale immunity from land confiscation, a deliberate policy to secure their loyalty for Scottish campaigns. These liberties often provided sanctuary for raiders and fugitives, with a formal protected status emerging through Edward's policies.

The Wars of Independence severely impacted the Borders, leading to the displacement of many local gentry families due to violence and instability. After the Battle of Bannockburn (1314), the weakened English crown effectively abandoned northern England, issuing scorched earth retreat orders that were often ignored by English borderers who joined in the plunder. Many families who did leave never to return. However, following the English victory at Halidon Hill (1333), both older and newly emergent surnames began to re-establish themselves in the region. It has been argued that these newcomers, many of whom had acquired wealth and status through military service, encouraged established local families to engage in criminal activity.

In the aftermath of the Battle of Bannockburn, a new type of soldier emerged from the northern counties: the hobelar. These lightly armoured cavalrymen, mounted on hardy fell ponies and equipped with lances or bows, rose to prominence during the reign of Edward III. The town of Appleby-in-Westmorland was burnt during this time and there was still evidence of its devastation until Henry VIII time.

Following Edward Balliol's defeat at the Battle of Halidon Hill (1333), England expanded into southern Scotland and neglected governance of the traditional border region, creating a power vacuum that fostered lawlessness. Despite the Treaty of Berwick ending the Wars of Scottish Independence after David II's return from English captivity in 1357, border raiding continued as an established way of life.

== The years of truces ==
=== From 1357 to the Wars of the Roses ===
Between the end of the Wars of Scottish Independence (1357) and the Battle of Flodden (1513) there were intermittent peace agreements and an uneasy balance of power between England and Scotland. Barely had the ink dried in 1357 before the Warden of the West March Thomas de Lucy was accused of imprisoning Scots for the purpose of ransom. Later he was accused of collusion with the men of Eskdale, there was a theft of several thousand animals and £20, in excess of £16,792 today.

The years of truce should not be regarded as a period of peace. Repeated cross-border raids, some conducted by state forces and others by independent raiding parties, caused widespread devastation. Many of these incursions originated from Scotland, yet the English government prioritised its campaigns in France over the defence of the northern border, leaving the border counties exposed to repeated raids, killings, and cattle theft. Indeed, one historian has suggested that the English Borderers suffered more from these raids than from periods of open warfare.

It was during the early part of this period that the English Crown gradually lost control of Berwickshire, Roxburghshire, and Annandale as they were reconquered by the Scots, through a prolonged campaign of warfare that left the Scottish borderlands impoverished and depopulated. The confusion over jurisdiction, where England and Scotland began at the time of English occupation, aided and may have encouraged crime. In 1370, the wardens of the marches were empowered to inspect every liberty, castle, and privileged district across the northern counties, with the aim of arresting those who defied their authority and generally correcting various abuses. Despite this, the 1370s on the Borders are recorded as particularly lawless and violent, with raiders sacking and burning houses, farms, and monasteries, while the people were either carried away or slaughtered. In addition, attacks and threats of violence reportedly prevented tax collectors from collecting taxes in Northumberland during the 1370s, reflecting resentment at the Crown's failure to defend the county against repeated Scottish raids.

Although there were long-term truces after the Wars of Scottish Independence and relatively few official cross-border raids, the archaeological record shows proliferation of more humble fortified structures such as bastle houses and pele towers across the Anglo-Scottish borderland; they responded to persistent threats of raiding and violence, which continued even during the periods of nominal peace.

Raiding continued as a persistent feature of the borderlands, punctuating periods of truce. These ranged from smaller skirmishes to occasional large-scale raids, such as the Battle of Otterburn (1388) and Homildon Hill (1402), which occasionally escalated into significant but localised conflicts. Both kingdoms sought to maintain periods of relative calm through truce agreements and diplomatic efforts, though these efforts were often fragile and difficult to enforce in the contested border regions.

In 1389, the major English border lords, in the Eastern marches, faced questioning over their commitment to the realm; they were accused of failing to provide troops, choosing instead to retreat behind their own walls and prioritise the fortification of their castella over repelling Scottish raids. It was around this time that English borderers were removed from positions of power as they were not trusted to defend the realm. An early example of behaviour typical of a Border reiver associated with a later surname occurs in 1408, when a Hedley was accused of leading Scots on a cattle raid into Hexhamshire. In 1414 the commons of Northumberland petitioned against the outrages committed by the inhabitants of the franchises of Tynedale, Redesdale, and Hexhamshire.

It was during this time we see the emergence of English border magnates like the Nevilles, Cliffords, and Dacres, as well as an emergent lower gentry such as the Musgraves, Roo, Herons, Scropes, and later still, the Eures, Mitfords, Ogles, Grays, and Moresbys, who would come to fill key positions along the English Borders, including Sheriff, Justice of the Peace, March Wardens, Keepers of Tynedale and Redesdale, Captains of Berwick and Carlisle, and other vital military and administrative roles responsible for the defence and governance of this volatile frontier region. With the exception of the Ogle family, who held no property elsewhere, these landowners were largely absentee. The Border gentry were few in number and much poorer compared with other parts of England and having about the same income as a southern yeoman in the early Tudor period. For example, amongst the very largest manors on the English frontier, Otterburn with a total area of 88,000 acres, was bringing in 20 marks a year in the 1490s - which is roughly £13,000 today. Scottish lairds were noticeably poorer than their English equilavents.

The Percy family, Earls of Northumberland, played a significant role in the conflicts that destabilised England. The Percys first rebelled against King Henry IV during the early 15th century, joining forces with Owain Glyndŵr and Edmund Mortimer in the Tripartite Indenture, a plan to divide England and Wales between them. Led by Sir Henry "Hotspur" Percy, the rebellion culminated in the Battle of Shrewsbury (1403), where Hotspur was killed.

Despite two further rebellions by the Percies, the 2nd Earl of Northumberland was restored as Warden of the Marches by Henry V. During this period, the Percy family consolidated their power in the north, notably absorbing the liberty of Redesdale from the Umfraville to Tailboys vassals in 1436, following the extinction of the Umfraville line. Despite this growing authority and the responsibilities of the Wardenship, reports of "numerous robbers and felons called Intakers [receivers of stolen goods] and Outputters [smugglers]" continued to trouble the region.

=== The Wars of the Roses ===
During the period leading up to the Wars of the Roses, the Percy family expanded their influence in the eastern regions, while the Neville family grew in power in Cumbria, fostering a bitter rivalry. The two families supported opposing factions in the conflict, with the Nevilles aligning more successfully with the Yorkist cause. The poor choice of allegiance of the Percy's, along with the Herons and Tailboys, meant instability and rising criminality following Towton (1461) in the East and Middle March as deaths and confiscations followed. This strategic advantage allowed the Nevilles to claim the Percy earldom in 1463 following the Percys’ poor choice of allegiance. Neville's may have de jure Earls of Northumberland, but the King of Scotland who had advanced in the wake of Towton were de facto ruler of Northumberland north of the Tyne until 1463.

During the Wars of the Roses, southern English communities viewed northern Borderers as a constant threat: following the campaigns of 1460–61 were seen by figures like Abbot Whethamstede as a northern rebellion, with chroniclers describing northerners as a "plague of locusts" feared for robbery and devastation, particularly in London. This perception of the north as a militarized and hostile frontier region reinforced southern anxieties about the Borderers.

Despite the ongoing civil war between the houses of Lancaster and York, truces with Scotland were maintained and periodically renewed. A 40-year truce was agreed upon in 1479.

However, despite the agreement, raiding resumed the following year. During the so-called Gloucester's War, The Earl of Angus led a deep raid into the East March, prompting a retaliatory campaign by Richard, Duke of Gloucester, who launched a raid into Scotland. This outbreak of violence was short-lived, concluding by 1484. Nevertheless, the devastation was so extensive that the Barony of Gilsland in Cumbria, held by Lord Dacre, was assessed at only 15% of its previous value in the aftermath of Gloucester's War. In addition, much of the northern fringes of Northumberland were 'wastes' due to this short-lived conflict and constant raiding, some until as late as the 1540s. (Note: Recent scholarship suggests a level of skepticism regarding the extent of the damage wrought by the Scots, noting that these reports often served as convenient justifications for tax exemptions.See England's Northern Frontier by Jackson W. Armstrong (2021), p89-91) To note, Richard, Duke of Gloucester, was the only individual to be granted a Wardenry as a hereditary title, having been appointed hereditary Warden of the West March by his brother, Edward IV.

This brief conflict was significant for one key reason: it marked the final time Berwick-upon-Tweed changed hands, solidifying English control over the strategic town. Additionally, it saw the Duke of Albany cede control over much of South West Scotland, although this concession proved short-lived, with the territory returning to Scottish hands not long after.

== The early Tudor Period ==
=== Henry VII and James IV ===
Henry VII and James IV were initially cordial, encouraged the Border courts and reminded the Border magnates of their obligation to maintain truce. However, the period soon saw growing tensions and rivalry between the two monarchs and an increase in banditry, as the fragile truces often proved difficult to enforce.

In 1495, the pretender to the English crown, Perkin Warbeck became a guest of James IV and raids resumed on both sides of the Border with renewed intensity, disrupting the fragile peace established earlier. In the following year, Warbeck led a small-scale invasion of England, attempting to capitalise on the ongoing tensions between England and Scotland. The invasion, however, was poorly supported and ultimately failed to achieve any significant objectives.

In the same year as Perkin Warbeck's raid, Henry VII revoked Tynedale’s liberty status and incorporated it into the county of Northumberland. Some of the lawlessness in the early Tudor period stemmed from the Crown's weakening of northern noble power, especially the marginalisation of the Percy family, Earls of Northumberland. In their place, less powerful or impoverished nobles were appointed as Wardens or captains. The lesser nobles lacked the authority or resources or even the will-power to suppress banditry, many turned to corruption or simply failed to control banditry, sometimes resigning early because they felt disinterested or overwhelmed. An interest example of failure is Sir William Radcliffe who was made capitanus de Redesdale to suppress lawlessness and pursue an alleged witch, was reportedly too incompetent to carry out his duties.

In 1502, Hob the King (Halbert Elliot) and Dand the Man (Andrew Elliot) rode out from Liddesdale and brazenly stole 180 sheep from the Lammermuir Hills, within sight of the city of Edinburgh, demonstrating that Borderers had little hesitation in raiding their own countrymen when it suited them.

In 1509, a dispute over harbour dues between the municipality of Newcastle and the Prior of Tynemouth escalated into outright violence. The Prior, assembling a company of 500 armed men from liberties of Tynedale and Redesdale - equipped with spears, swords, bows, and arrows - ordered them to attack Newcastle. (Note: Similarly, in 1441 the Archbishop of York had brought armed men from Tynedale and Hexhamshire to strong-arm his opponents in York. (See England's Northern Frontier by Jackson W. Armstrong, 2021, p55)) Over the course of six days, the raiders killed around 100 inhabitants and effectively laid siege to the city. The inhabitants of Newcastle, fearing for their lives, were forced to remain within the city walls, unable to retaliate. (Note: Antagonism by the city must have continued, as 65 years later members of Newcastle's guilds were prohibited from employing anyone from, or raised in, Tynedale and Redesdale (Crow 2007, p. 327).)

==== Decay of the Borders ====
During the early Tudor period, governance and expenditure on the English side of the border underwent significant changes. The Border castles were removed from the control of the Wardens, their garrisons were greatly reduced, and Warden salaries were cut. As a result, the responsibility for border defence increasingly fell to the local nobility who lacked the manpower to suppress banditry. The prevailing consensus amongst historians is that early Tudor northern frontier policy contributed to a weakening of law and order and destabilisation of the region. In contrast, defence on the Scottish side of the border was less centralised; the Scottish crown maintained neither permanent garrisons nor castles, often choosing to dismantle strongholds rather than maintain them.

== Henry VIII, James IV, and the Battle of Flodden ==
The 1503 marriage of Margaret Tudor to James IV, under the Treaty of Perpetual Peace, aimed to stabilise Anglo-Scottish relations. However, tensions persisted, with Henry VIII antagonising James by withholding Margaret's dowry and asserting English overlordship. From at least 1504, the Border sheriffdoms were subjected to punitive ayres, judicial raids, or 'dauntings' led by either the monarch or the march wardens to suppress criminality.

=== The murder of Robert Ker ===
Sometime between 1500 and 1511, John "the Bastard" Heron murdered Robert Ker of Cessford, Warden of the Middle March, during a March Day meeting, an extraordinary breach of protocol. The act sparked a violent feud, with reprisals including the murder of Heron's accomplice in York. James IV viewed the unresolved killing as a major insult, referencing it in a letter to Henry VIII in August 1513 just weeks before Flodden. (Note: In addition to the murder of Robert Ker, James IV was deeply angered by the murder of the privateer, Andrew Barton.(Calendar of State Papers Milan, vol.1 (1912), p. 406 no.660, Brian Tuke to Richard Pace, 22 September 1513))

=== The Ill Raid ===
A month before Flodden, Alexander, Lord Home, led a disastrous raid into England, with 900 Scots killed or captured by Sir William Bulmer. Days before the battle of Flodden, Catherine of Aragon pardoned Heron for Ker's murder; he would go on to help guide the English army and fight with a band of fifty outlaws.

=== The Battle of Flodden ===
On 9 September 1513, James IV and the bulk of Scotland's nobility were killed at the Battle of Flodden. Losses included 21 earls, 14 lords, and as many as 8,000 men.

At Flodden, Border troops fought on both sides. Thomas Dacre's English force included feuding contingents from Tynemouthshire and Bamburghshire, alongside Heron's outlaws. On the Scottish right, Home's mixed force nearly broke the English line. When Lord Howard's flank faltered, Heron's men launched a decisive counterattack, saving the position.

Home's withdrawal from the field, possibly due to Dacre's influence or his brother's captivity, critically weakened the Scots. His failed attempt to retake the Scottish guns ended the campaign.

The battle also revealed the opportunism of Border society: while the armies clashed, men from Teviotdale and Tynedale looted the English baggage train. Some English Borderers were even accused of assisting the Scots and taking prisoners on both sides—allegations denied by Dacre.

By the late evening of 9 September 1513, most of Scotland's leading men lay dead on English soil, their loss devastating the kingdom's leadership. Among the few surviving magnates was Alexander, Lord Home. The body of King James IV was discovered on the battlefield and later sent south by Thomas Dacre as proof of the catastrophic defeat and the death of the King of Scots. This national tragedy is still remembered in various forms during the "Common Ridings" in many towns across the Border region.

== The Heyday (1513–1603) ==
The last hundred years is often regarded as the heyday of the Border reivers, characterised by persistent raiding, feuding, and lawlessness perhaps the worst the Borders had seen. However, while the 16th century, especially its later decades is the best recorded, with the most surviving sources, this does not necessarily mean it was the most severe.

It was the period we see the end of the liberties of Redesdale and the end of the Debatable Land. The era also saw the end of the militarised border. The Union of the Crowns in 1603, when James VI of Scotland succeeded to the English throne as James I, marked the end of centuries of conflict between the two kingdoms.

=== After Flodden ===
Almost immediately after the Battle of Flodden, riders from Scotland launched raids, burning four towns in England. In response, Dacre led punitive judicial raids, devastating towns such as Annan and razing villages and buildings across Teviotdale, Liddesdale, and Ewesdale, while seizing 4,000 head of cattle. In 1517, the cloister of Kelso Abbey lacked a roof after raiders stripped it of its lead. Such attacks were not limited to cross-border incursions; in a 1528 letter, the English Earl of Northumberland reported that the Scottish surname heidsman Sym Armstrong had openly boasted of having "laid down", meaning entirely demolished, thirty parish churches inside Scotland.

Dacre, reportedly acting under the direction of Cardinal Wolsey and King Henry VIII, paid Scottish surnames to conduct raids into Scotland while simultaneously entertaining factions opposed to the Angus regency. Far from attempting to control the Borders, Dacre was orchestrating chaos to undermine Scottish stability. Ironically, a joint Maxwell-Irvine force of 400 men raided the Debatable Land and lifted 700 cattle from his tenants. When Dacre lodged a complaint, the Maxwell heidsman reportedly replied that the cattle had been taken "orderly, according to the customs of the Borders."

=== Settling the Debatable Land ===
In the early 16th century, the Armstrongs and Grahams broke with Border custom by settling in the Debatable Land, a territory long regarded as neutral and lawless. This incursion was acknowledged by the Scottish government as early as 1517 or 1518. Meanwhile, Lord Dacre, permitted loyal Scottish Grahams to settle its southern end, further eroding its no-man's-land status. One account suggests that the banished Grahams first settled in 1516, with the Armstrongs following in 1518, reportedly with Lord Dacre's approval.

The policy of tolerating settlement in the Debatable Land did nothing to curb banditry in the Anglo-Scottish borderlands; criminality persisted, and the Armstrongs only grew more powerful.

=== 'Heyday South of the Border' ===
Throughout the 1520s, amid persistent famine and rinderpest outbreaks, the already overpopulated Cheviot Highlands suffered further strain. The ensuing social disruption, exacerbated by war, famine, and disease, fostered the rise of large bands of plunderers operating across the Anglo-Scottish borderlands.

These groups sometimes coalesced around local minor noble or gentry figures into confederacies led by individuals such as Sir Nicholas Ridley in the early 1520s and later Sir William Lisle of Felton in the mid-to-late 1520s. Notably, both had previously served as lawmen, yet in the all to common Border formula, those charged with maintaining order increasingly became, effectively, poachers. Some, like the then Warden and former Keeper of Redesdale, Thomas Dacre, 2nd Baron Dacre, got perilously close to being outlawed for associating too closely with known thieves. In 1525, law and order had decayed so much that a raid got within 8 miles of the city of Newcastle.

North of the border, Lord Dacre launched two massive raids against the Armstrongs of Liddesdale and the Debatable Land. In retaliation, the Armstrongs mounted raids into Cumbria. Dacre, in turn, responded again, but this time he retaliated by burning the towers of the sons of the infamous Johnny Armstrong. While the Armstrong-Dacre feud raged on, it was only one of many such raids and counter-raids along the border.

==== Monition of Cursing ====
In 1525, the Archbishop of Glasgow, Gavin Dunbar, issued the extraordinary fifteen-hundred word Monition of Cursing, damning all who dwelled in the Borders to hell.

I curse thair heid and all tha haris of their head; I curse thair face, thair ene, thair mouth, thair neise, thair toung, thair teith, thair crag, thair schulderis, thair breist, thair hert, thair stomok, thair bak, thair wame, thair armes, thair leggis, thair handis, thair feit, and everilk part of thair body, frae the top of thair heaid to the soill of thair feit, befoir and behding, within and without...

It was also during this time that the Bishop of Durham cursed the men of Tynedale.

==== James V's Attainment of Majority ====
This period was bookended in 1530 by the coming of age of James V, who sought to assert royal authority over the Borders by imprisoning, and in some cases executing, leading figures he perceived as threats to his kingdom. Among those captured was the aforementioned Johnny Armstrong and 35 of his followers. Johnny's capture and execution was later romanticised in the ballad Johnnie Armstrong. Despite James V best efforts to suppress banditry, by imprisoning and mass hangings, there was seemingly little change.

==== Pilgrimage of the Grace ====
The Pilgrimage of Grace was a large-scale rebellion in 1536 against Henry VIII's religious and political reforms, particularly the dissolution of the monasteries, drawing support from across Northern England.

It was during this time that four rebel captains in Penrith made a proclamation that the king was not defending the area against the Scots and called for mutual defence and "...a prince to be made a king to defend the realm."

The Pilgrimage of Grace had notable connections to the Border Reivers, particularly through the Percy family and their alliances in Tynedale and Redesdale. Sir Thomas Percy, brother of Henry Percy, 6th Earl of Northumberland, played a leading role in the rebellion and sought the support of prominent Border surnames. Representatives from Tynedale and Redesdale, including Edward and Cuthbert Charlton of Bellingham and John Hall of Otterburn, were present at the Pontefract meeting with the Duke of Norfolk.

Their involvement was likely facilitated by ‘Little’ John Heron of Chipchase, a key Percy ally with strong ties to the Charltons. Heron leveraged these connections to rally Border support, including resistance to the dissolution of Hexham Abbey, with the Charltons and their followers pledging their loyalty in exchange for payment. The reivers' participation extended beyond the rebellion itself, as seen in their role in the occupation of Ford Castle and the assassination of Roger Fenwick, the newly appointed Keeper of Tynedale, in early 1537.

In 1536, Henry VIII abolished Redesdale’s liberty status and fully integrated it into the county of Northumberland.

Lawlessness increased with the downfall of the Dacre in the West and the disgrace of the Percies in the East, as no Border lord could unite the Surnames under a single banner. By 1541, conditions had deteriorated to such an extent that some in Northumberland looked back with nostalgia on the fourteenth-century period of English occupation north of the border, regarding it as an era of relative peace and prosperity despite its own endemic violence.

In 1542, the lawlessness, particularly of Redesdale and Tynedale was said thus:

[Inhabitants there]...nothinge regard[ed] eyther the lawes of God or of the kinges majesties for any love or other lawful consideracion, but onely for the drede and feare of instante coreccion.

=== The Borders during the Rough Wooing ===
History may not repeat itself, but it does rhyme. Like his father, James IV, who perished at Flodden, James V suffered a decisive defeat at the Battle of Solway Moss in 1542. However, unlike his father, he did not fall in battle but succumbed to illness soon afterward. Once again, the Scottish throne passed to an infant - this time, a girl, Mary, Queen of Scots. In the aftermath, Scotland descended into factional strife as rival nobles vied for the Regency. Seizing the moment, Henry VIII intervened in Scottish affairs, exploiting both political instability and the growing religious tensions of the Reformation.

The conflict known as the Rough Wooing, lasting from 1542 to 1551, refers to Henry VIII's military and diplomatic campaign aimed at coercing the leading Scottish nobility into agreeing to a marriage between his infant son Edward and the young Mary, Queen of Scots. This led to the destruction of 192 towns, towers, and bastle-houses, as well as the capture of 20,000 cattle. This devastation only made the Borders more dangerous and lawless, with English and Scottish borderers including the local Scottish aristocracy, joining in the depredation.

During this period, Henry VIII and his appointed man on the Borders, Sir Richard Wharton, actively encouraged Scottish raiding. A notable instance occurred in 1543, when the Liddesdale Armstrongs were urged to raid and burn the lands and property of the Kerrs and Scotts. Despite this support, the Liddesdale Armstrongs carried out an attack on Hexham in the same year. A contemporary report described English villages as desolate, calling for their repopulation and for increased enforcement by local garrisons.

Included among the Scottish Surnames most actively fighting alongside the English Borderers, southern English troops and foreign mercenaries were the Olivers, Davidsons, Pringles, Taits, Youngs, Turnballs, Elliots, Crosers, Nixons, Armstrongs and Rutherfords. The principle target of these raids were the Surnames Maxwell and Kerr. In 1552, the long-standing feud between the Scotts and the Kerrs spilled into Edinburgh, where Sir Walter Scott of Buccleuch was assassinated by members of the Kerr family.

Following the Pilgrimage of the Graces, Henry VIII took a far greater interest in the Borders - even making himself a Warden. This seemed to reduce banditry and lawlessness temporarily. However, by the late 1540s and into the 1550s government in the south again lost interest and reduced expenditure which lead once again to lawlessness and 'wilderness'. A report written found that many castles that had been destroyed in the last half century or more were still ruined and accused the local gentry of disinterested in maintaining law and order.

=== The Borders in the Age of Queens ===
With the accession of Mary, Queen of Scots, and Queen Mary I of England, both Catholic monarchs, peace should have returned to the Border. However, with decades, perhaps centuries, of ongoing antagonism between the two states and a deeply entrenched culture of raiding, this did not happen.

==== The end of the Debatable Land ====
At the Treaty of Norham officially ending 'the Rough Wooing', the Debatable Land was finally divided between Scotland and England. The division was decided in 1552 by a French ambassador, who drew a simple straight line to evenly split the territory between the two nations. However, this seemingly simple tale took a turn, as a slightly different boundary was ultimately chosen, one that now forms the present-day border, known as Scots Dyke. This may be due to it marking where the parishes of Kirkandrews-on-Esk and Canonbie meet.

Despite the division, the March Day courts were overwhelmed, with a five-hundred bills of complaint recorded in a single session, while an official attempt to suppress banditry in Liddesdale was forcefully repulsed.

==== Accession of Elizabeth I ====
With the accession of Queen Elizabeth I in 1558, England saw its last monarch to rule before the end of the Border as a lawless frontier. Nevertheless, the Border remained very much alive on both sides.

==== The Scottish Reformation, the Borders, and Mary's downfall ====
In 1564, a feud erupted between the Elliots and the Scotts, marked by cycles of raids and retaliation. As tensions escalated, this conflict became entangled with the broader political and religious instability of the Scottish Reformation, where both the English and Scottish crowns vied for influence in the Borderlands. The Protestant Lord Moray, James Stewart, sought to weaken the Catholic Mary, Queen of Scots, further exacerbating the turbulence. Queen Mary's half-brother, James Stewart, led a foray into the region, capturing between twenty and thirty reivers, before seizing another forty.

Amidst this unrest, James, Earl of Bothwell was involved in Border feuds. He survived an attack by Little Jock Elliot of Park in 1566. Mary came from Jedburgh to see Bothwell at Hermitage Castle while he recovered from his wounds. This visit marked the beginning of a closer relationship between Mary and Bothwell, and his political influence grew. Bothwell was widely suspected of orchestrating Lord Darnley's murder, and shortly after, he married Mary, sparking a political crisis. Their union, controversial due to the circumstances of Darnley's death, led ultimately to Mary's abdication in 1567.

==== Rising of the North ====
After the rebellion, Mary fled south to England in 1568, seeking Elizabeth's protection. However, Elizabeth regarded Mary as a political threat due to her Catholic claim to the English throne, setting the stage for further unrest. In 1569, major northern Catholic magnates, such as Thomas Percy, 7th Earl of Northumberland (recently removed from his position of March Warden of the East and Middle March) and Charles Neville, 6th Earl of Westmorland led the Rising of the North in an attempt to restore Catholic rule and potentially install Mary on the throne. They were joined by Leonard Dacre, a nephew of the Dacres of Gilsland (a family line that had fallen into abeyance), who felt aggrieved by Queen Elizabeth's land allocation decisions.

The failure of the Rising of the North forced the Percies and Nevilles to flee to Scotland, leaving them with no refuge but the infamous Liddesdale, where they were compelled to make peace with the many thieves and outlaws who resided there. There, in Liddesdale, the fugitive earls were received by Jock-of-the-Side and the notorious Black Ormiston, the latter was known for his participation in the murder of Lord Darnley. In the chaos of their flight, the fugitives not only had to contend with a superior royal army but also suffered the theft of horses and clothing by local outlaws. Another Borderer, Hector Armstrong of Harelaw, captured the Earl of Northumberland and handed him over to the Regent Moray. Reprisals were swift and brutal: scores of impoverished Borderers were summarily executed without trial. On the Scottish-side of the border, there were issues over finding qualified presbyter for the new Presbyterian church in the later 16th century.

==== After the Rising ====
The downfall of the leading magnates on the English frontier created greater opportunities for banditry. In one raid in the English Middle Marches alone, 140 captives were taken from one township. Following this, English Wardens of the March rode across burning and destroying property of those who had supported the Rising of the North and outlaws. Banditry persisted for decades, necessitating continued Truce Days, some ending in violence, as seen in the Raid of the Redeswire (1575) and Windgyle (1585), mirroring an earlier violent Truce Day in the first decade of the 1500s.

=== The final years ===
Although both kingdoms were united by religion and allied, the latter part of the 16th century saw a perceived deterioration in conditions along the Border, with tensions intensifying in the years leading up to the Union of the Crowns in 1603 according to George MacDonald Fraser. Though according to Anna Groundwater, large scale raiding was reportedly in decline in the late 16th century. In 1587, the government of James VI wanting to prove it's capability to the English, who he was sure he was soon to be king of, introduced a new act in an attempt to suppress reiving.

==== Kinmont Willie ====
In 1583, Kinmont Willie Armstrong led 300 reivers into North Tynedale where they stole cattle, horses and sheep, burnt 60 houses and killed 10 men. In October 1587, a raid into Tynedale by 400 Scottish attackers led by Kinmont Willie Armstrong led to the partial destruction of Haydon Bridge.

It is not entirely clear how or why English warden Lord Thomas Scrope captured the infamous Kinmont Willie following a Truce Day in 1596, thus breaking customary law. This greatly enraged the Scottish warden of the West March, Walter Scott of Buccleuch, Keeper of Liddesdale, who then led a daring, but successful raid into Carlisle Castle to free Kinmont Willie. Among the known outlaws who joined the raid were several notable lawmen and landowners, including Aud Watt of Harden and the Carleton brothers, major landowners in northern Cumberland and former lawmen. This event is remembered in the ballad Kinmont Willie.

This jailbreak greatly upset Queen Elizabeth I and created a diplomatic dispute between the two kingdoms. After several months, during which he led raids into England, Bold Buccleuch eventually surrendered, travelled to London, and returned in exchange for his son, emerging from the ordeal as a changed man.

=== End of the Border ===
By the death of Elizabeth I of England, things had come to such a pitch along the border that the English government considered re-fortifying and rebuilding Hadrian's Wall. When Elizabeth died, there was an especially violent outbreak of raiding known as "Ill Week", resulting from the convenient belief that the laws of a kingdom were suspended between the death of a sovereign and the proclamation of the successor. Upon his accession to the English throne, James VI of Scotland (who became James I of England) moved hard against the reivers, abolishing border law and the very term "Borders" in favour of "Middle Shires", and dealing out stern justice to reivers. Although the Border reivers vanished following James IV/I suppression, patterns of violence and feuding, lawlessness and organised criminal activity reportedly persisted in parts of the borderlands into the early reign of George III.

== Nature ==
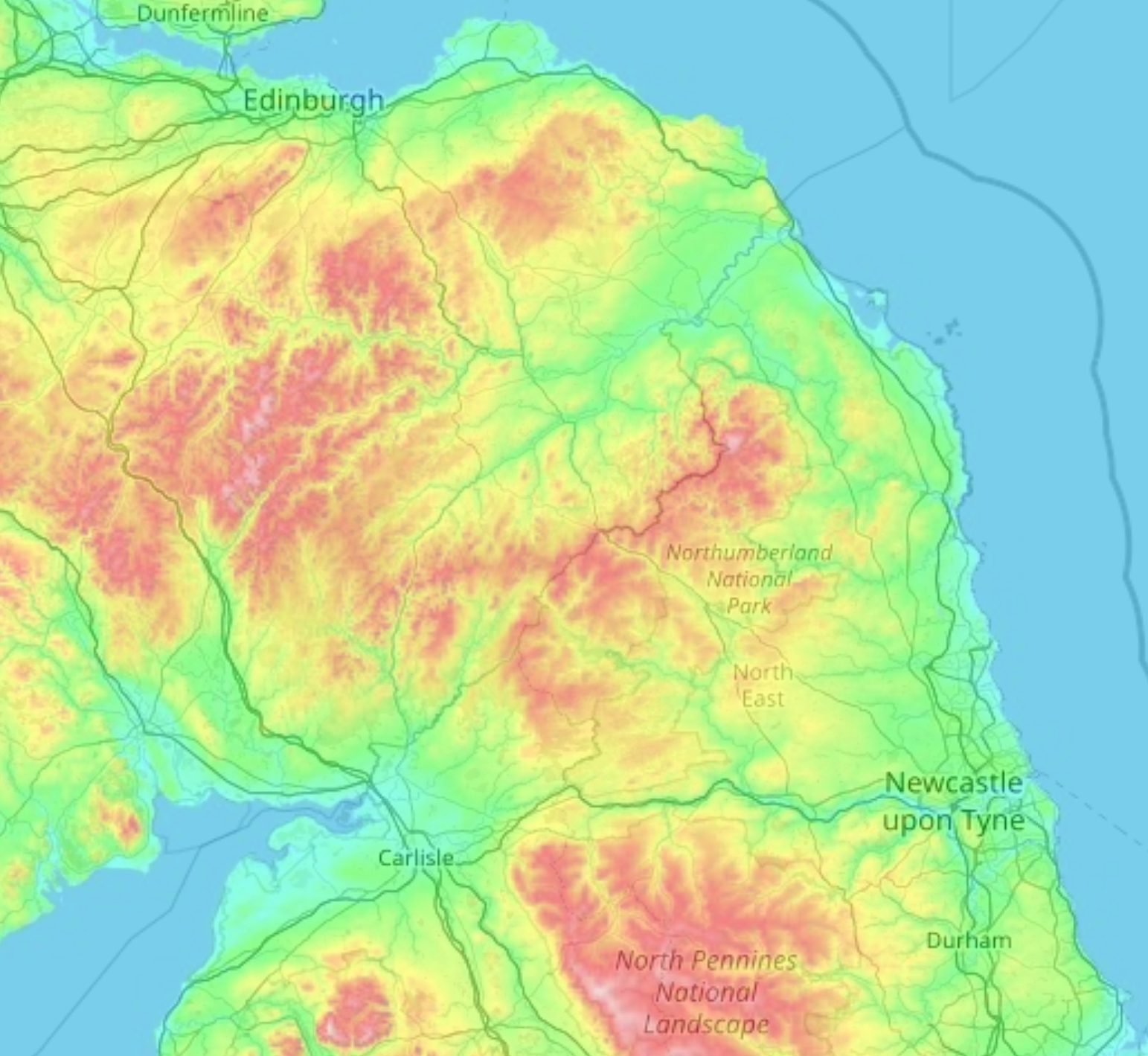
Topographic Map of Anglo-Scottish Borderlands

=== Conditions on the frontier ===
The Anglo-Scottish Borderlands were characterised by a significant proportion of boggy terrain, poorer soils, and a harsher climate compared to southern or central England. The endless raiding, on top of the bad soil and mountainous conditions, may have encouraged pastoralism because at least cattle and sheep could be driven out of harms way, whilst crops may have been destroyed. These conditions favoured pastoralism over arable farming, encouraging dispersed settlement patterns and limiting the development of urban centres. Historian Henry Summerson argued that pastoralism expanded during the later Middle Ages, particularly in the aftermath of the Black Death. Jackson W. Armstrong, writing in England's Northern Frontier, argues that saying conditions engendered lawlessness is overly geographically deterministic and perhaps romantic, citing other English regions with comparable landscapes and dispersed settlements. The topography of the Borders meant that any small raids were directed by the river valleys from the Cheviot Highlands down into the wealthier villages of the seaward plains of Northumberland.

A growing population in the late 15th century pushed the growth of more settlement on more marginal land, leading to population pressures that is said to have led to greater militarisation of peasantry. A royal survey conducted in 1541 concluded that both the liberties of Redesdale and Tynedale had more inhabitants than the poor land could adequately support. Pastoralism grew more common in the Cheviot Highlands, shown in contemporary textual evidence, as the climate worsened, with a growing population farming increasingly marginal land. Evidence suggests that forest cover in the Cheviots declined significantly during the early 16th century. By the Tudor period, English landowners had largely left their tenants to their own defence with large areas closer to the border left as wastes.

Borderers who dwelled in the highlands led a transhumance existence, moving their herds with the seasons: driving them up to the highland pastures in summer for lush grazing, and returning to the lowlands in winter for shelter and fodder. This Borderer identity was by degree by how close they were to border and politically to their respective centres of power. Scottish livestock was frequently pastored on English territory. The practice of transhumance in the Borders appears to have predated the Norman invasion. An unusually large proportion of the land was held in common, at least on the English-side. In the Cheviot highlands resources were distributed communally. This egalitarianism in property ownership unsettled contemporaries.

A system of partible inheritance is evident in some parts of the English side of the Borders in the sixteenth century. By contrast to primogeniture, this meant that land was divided equally among all sons following a father's death; it could mean that the inheriting generation held insufficient land on which to survive. As a result of their distinctive practices of partible inheritance, cattle-rustling, and clan-nism, Elizabethan observers frequently compared the Borderers to the Irish; Matthew Parker, the Archbishop of Canterbury, feared the area would become "...too much Irish and savage," without the introduction of Anglican bishops to the northern frontier dioceses.

A man's wealth was judged by the number of sheep and cattle he possessed not by the grandeur of dwelling. It was not uncommon for tenancy agreements to stipulate that, rather than providing labour or agricultural produce, tenants were required to contribute military service, offering their fighting strength in lieu of traditional rents. As part of that arrangement, tenants were also obligated to maintain their own weapons, horses, and harnesses. This system of military tenancy may have originated on the Border as early as the Norman colonisation of the Borders, when the need for a readily available mounted force, like the radmen found on the emerging Norman-Welsh border, was paramount in securing and defending the frontier. Known as dregnage, a term of Norse origin, this practice may in fact reflect an even older, possibly Anglo-Scandinavian, tradition of military service tied to landholding.

=== Feuding ===
Deadly feud was a common element of Border reiver culture. Along with the emergence kinship groups deadly feud may have arose due to weak government. Contemporaneously by both English and Scottish government viewed feuding a particularly border phenomenon. In 1598, James VI Scotland criminalised feuding in the whole of his kingdom; feuding (and to note, cattle raiding) had been banned in England under the Great Statute of Treasons of 1352, however it seemed to have little effect.

Feuds very often happened between Surnames, perhaps most deadly was that of the Maxwells and Johnstones rivalry in the Scottish Western March and the feud between the Kers and the Scotts in the Middle March. But sometimes it happened between rival branches, like between the Kers of Ferniehirst and Cessford These feuds could carry over into 'allied' Surnames to produce a network of feuds. These feuds could also happen between Surnames and burghs, for example a branch of the Kers and the town of Jedburgh. These feuds could also be international, with Kers managing to also feud with the Charltons of Hesleyside in England.

=== Religion ===
Borderers were noted for their long attachment to the Catholic Church long after the introduction of the Reformation. The religion they practised was reportedly strictly practical, with their devotion to rosaries being strongest just before setting out on a raid. Furthermore, christenings on the Scottish Border, the child's master hand was intentionally left unblessed so they could later strike "unhallowed blows upon the enemy." Bishop Fox in 1498 admonished priests in Tynedale for mixing with known criminals and outlaws. Later when Tynedale excommunicated by the Bishop of Durham in 1525, the Charlton kin-group went to the extraordinary length of smuggling a Scottish friar across the border simply to celebrate mass in Bellingham church. Bernard Gilpin, the early Protestant reformer, recounted visiting Redesdale and finding no minister, bell, or book. During the visit, he was reportedly approached by a horseman who, recognising him as a godly man, handed him the corpse of a dead infant and said, “Come, parson, and do the cure.”

Auld Wat of Harden by Tom Scott. A romanticised image of a notorious raider, Walter Scott of Harden.

=== Raiding ===
Raiding was rarely a one-off event; it was both normative and systemic, forming an accepted part of border culture and structured patterns of social and economic life, embraced and practiced across all levels of the class structure. The reivers were both English and Scottish and raided both sides of the border impartially. Their activities, although usually within a day's ride of the border, extended both north and south of their main haunts covering perhaps a tenth of the landmass of Britain. Borderers were reported to have raided as far north as the outskirts of Edinburgh, while incursions reached as far south as Yorkshire. Raids could often be transnational, involving conspiracies across borders. Beacons were frequently lit to forewarn local populations of impending raids. It is noticeable in English church records from the 13th to 16th century that parochial incomes fell drastically not only where they were close to the border but in areas that had been raided.

At the time these raids, both large and small, were known as "spoylings". 'Hijacking' - reivers robbing returning raids of their stolen goods - is known to occurred at least once. In local parlance, 'thift' meant theft, 'spulzie' meant to borrow without permission, 'heirschip' meant violent raid and 'reif' meant raiding, in particularly of livestock. Raids ranged from tens of men to thousands of men, with the majority being made up of less than two hundred men. In the last dozen or so years of the border, over fifty thousand cattle were estimated to be stolen. (Note: Based on 2026 market values, where the average price of store and finished cattle in Britain is approximately £2,000 per head, a herd of this size would have a contemporary valuation of £100,000,000.)

The landed elite conducted raids known as chevauchées, often in broad daylight, displaying their heraldic insignia to legitimise their actions. The borderer was said to prefer to ride everywhere, even to point it was seen almost shameful to walk. It's possible that raiding became so deeply embedded in the culture that it evolved into a rite of passage to adulthood. Most of the raids were small and tended to focus closer to the Border and focussed on smaller, isolated settlements. The main raiding season ran through the early winter months, when the nights were longest and the cattle and horses fat from having spent the summer grazing. The numbers involved in a raid might range from a few dozen to organised campaigns involving up to three thousand riders.

Local watches were formed to keep watch at night in preparation for raids. The custom of the 'hue and cry' was used to alert communities, and this practice was common in both the semi-nomadic Highlands and the settled Lowland communities. When raids did happen the peasantry would rush to the nearest defensive structure to hide. Fugitives who were captured by the hue and cry were often summarily executed.

When raiding, or riding, as it was termed, the reivers rode light on hardy nags or ponies renowned for the ability to pick their way over the boggy moss lands (see: Galloway pony, Hobelar). The Borderers had an extensive knowledge of the terrain, including hidden routes, passes (known as "ingates") and river fords, which allowed them to navigate the region efficiently and evade pursuit even in rough weather. One particular route through a hole in Hadrian's Wall, the Busy Gap near Housesteads, became a byword for criminality as it often a route used by Surnames of Redesdale and Tynedale for their raids. In 1540s, it was estimated that the liberty of Tynedale and Redesdale could raise 1,500 armed men.

=== Traditions and customs ===
According to local tradition, some Border reivers were said to have buried their most hated enemies beneath the threshold of their tower houses or bastles, so that they might symbolically tread on their enemies bodies and leaving their soul in a liminal space. There is a common narrative that the Border Reivers avoided killing, a narrative perpetuated by Sir Walter Scott. However, as George MacDonald Fraser points out in his definitive work on Border reiver history, The Steel Bonnets, this is far from the truth.

Although criminal activity was widespread, highway robbery was exceptional, often noted when it occurred; it stood apart - uncustomary, almost taboo, and seemingly beneath even their hardened code. Those who didn't keep their word or acted cowardly were ritually humiliated in a practice called 'baunchling,' where the man's glove was held aloft on the end of a lance symbolising his 'false hand'. A further supposed custom in Northumberland was that if a thief was caught, the man whose goods had been stolen was granted the right to behead the thief. This custom resulted in a hermit being compelled by a seargent to behead an individual who had robbed him.

=== Women in Border Society ===
Aeneas Silvius Piccolomini, later Pope Pius II, trip through the border 1435 where upon warning of a raid the men disappeared but the women continued because women went unharmed during raiding. This somewhat contradicts later evidence that Border violence was not gender-specific. Henry Summerson argues that the low number of female suspects in medieval Cumberland (13 out of 522 recorded) reflects the predominantly male nature of livestock rustling, suggesting that the theft of sheep and cattle on horseback was "pre-eminently a male concern". Following the Battle of Otterburn in 1388, the Bishop of Durham withdrew his forces from the area out of caution, reporting that he feared his troops "would certainly have been overwhelmed by the stones flung by women avenging the slaughter suffered by their husbands in battle." ln April 1500, requested help from the king in the arrest or four women from Newcastle who had been excommunicated for disobeying the bishop's orders.

=== Arms and armaments ===
The original dress of a shepherd's plaid was later replaced by light armour such as brigandines or jacks of plate (a type of sleeveless doublet into which small plates of steel were stitched), and metal helmets such as burgonets or morions; hence their nickname of the "steel bonnets". The use of 'iron' bonnets and lances in raids is recorded as early as 1415. They were armed with light lances - which were occasionally used as a javelin - and small shields, and sometimes also with longbows, or light crossbows, known as "latches", or later on in their history with one or more pistol, known as "gonns." They invariably also carried swords and dirks.

== Borderers as soldiers ==
Border reivers were sometimes in demand as mercenary soldiers, owing to their recognised skills as light cavalry. They were recruited into the English army invariably known as 'Bands of Northern Horseman' or 'Border Horse'. The Border Horse fought for Henry VIII (Note: Henry VIII once hosted a revel where they were dressed up in Border garb and armoury. See: Ralph Robson, The English Highland Clans, p101) in France under the Duke of Norfolk; and it appears also that Scottish Border Horse were spotted in France upon English abandonment of Calais. So impressed with the reputation of the quality of Borderers, Charles V, Holy Roman Emperor reportedly created a whole unit fashioned upon the Scottish Reivers. Reivers sometimes served in English or Scottish armies in the Low Countries and in Ireland, often to avoid having harsher penalties enacted upon themselves and their families. Reivers fighting as levied soldiers played important roles in the battles at Flodden and Solway Moss. After meeting one reiver (the Bold Buccleugh), Queen Elizabeth I is quoted as having said that "with ten thousand such men, James VI could shake any throne in Europe."

As warriors more loyal to clans than to nations, their commitment to the work was always in doubt. At battles such as Ancrum Moor in Scotland in 1545, borderers changed sides in mid-combat to curry favour with the likely victors. At the Battle of Pinkie Cleugh in 1547, an observer (William Patten) noticed Scottish and English borderers chatting with each other, then putting on a spirited show of combat once they knew they had been spotted.

== Dwellings and fortifications ==
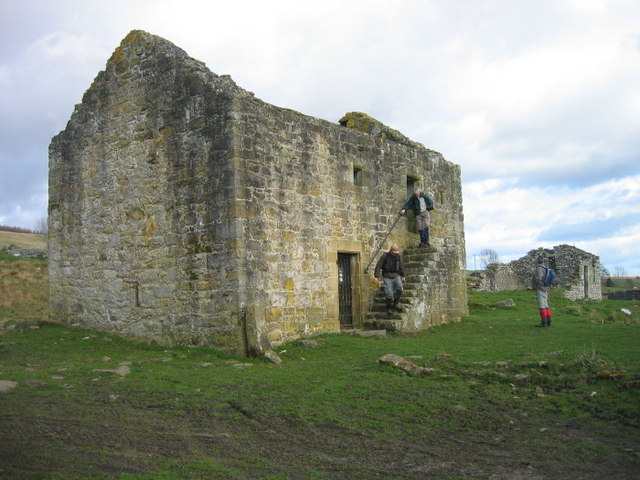
Black Middens Bastle House, a surviving bastle house near Kielder Water in Northumberland

The inhabitants of the Borders had to live in a state of constant alert, and for self-protection, they built fortified tower houses. There are, by one estimate, 547 tower houses that have been identified in the far north of England: 171 in Cumberland, 71 in Westmorland, and 305 in Northumberland. The categorisation, quantity, and quality of data available for Scotland are considerably poorer than for England, and the available records are more fragmentary, preventing a complete picture of Border castles and fortifications.

Large-scale violent assaults on homes were common in the Borders, whereas they were rare elsewhere. The same author, however, questions how serious these fortified private structures were in terms of defence and intention. Much like the great medieval castles, the various private fortified structures of the Borders served as symbols of power and prestige as much as they did for defence. As raising livestock in the borders required a transhumance lifestyle in summer months, borderers would create temporary shelter (shielings) to accommodate this nomadic behaviour. According to the archaeological team led by Time Team during their survey of Colour Clough, sheilings in the border region remain poorly investigated. These shielings contribute to the toponyms of many places in the borders such as Galashiels or "Shiels Brae".

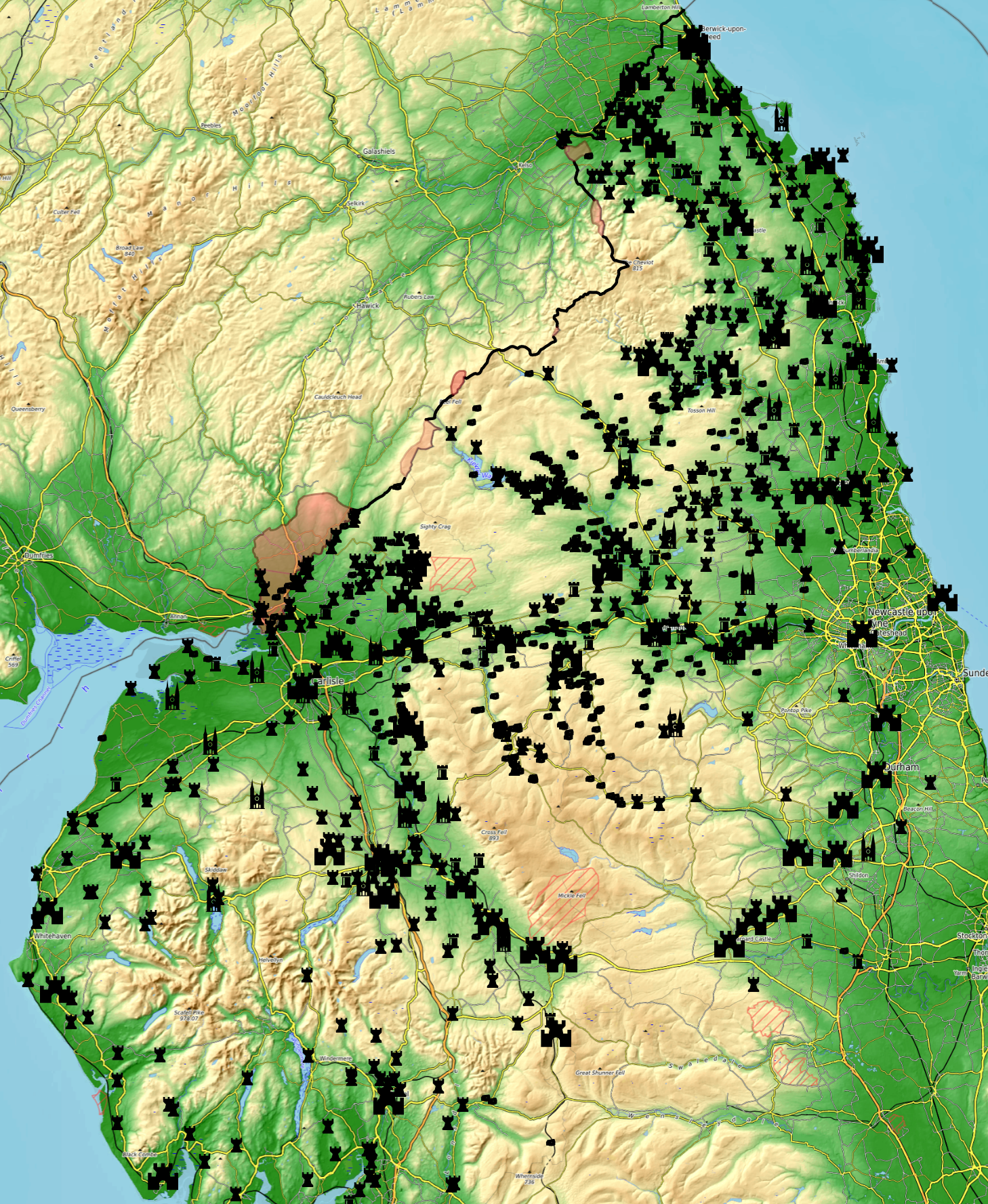
English Border Fortifications: Masonry Castles (34); Tower Houses (48); Peel Towers (404); Bastles (444); Fortified Churches (35)

In the very worst periods of warfare, people were unable to construct more than crude turf cabins, the destruction of which would be little loss and could be rebuilt within 3–4 hours and weren't always temporarily inhabited. When times allowed, however, they built houses designed as much for defence as shelter. The bastle house was a stout two-storeyed building. The lower floor was used to keep the most valuable livestock and horses. The upper storey housed the people, and often could be reached only by an external ladder which was pulled up at night or if danger threatened. The stone walls were up to 3 feet (0.9 m) thick, and the roof was of slate or stone tiles. Only narrow arrow slits provided light and ventilation. Rooms in these peal towers would have been dark and gloomy and smoke-filled with very little furniture. There is noticeable large increase in the number of fortified structures in Scotland from 1485 onwards, and a general increase in the number and variety of sizes and types of structures, particularly in the Cheviot Highlands. Some resided in houses built from massive oak timbers with turf roofs, strategically concealed within the landscape and designed to resist fire and forced entry.

Peel towers (also spelled pele towers) were usually three-storeyed buildings, constructed specifically for defensive purposes by the authorities, or for prestigious individuals such as the heads of clans. Smailholm Tower is one of many surviving peel towers. Like bastle houses, they were very strongly constructed for defence. If necessary, they could be temporarily abandoned and stuffed full of smouldering turf to prevent an enemy (such as a government army) destroying them with gunpowder. Peel towers and bastle houses were often surrounded by a stone wall known as a barmkin.

== Law and order ==
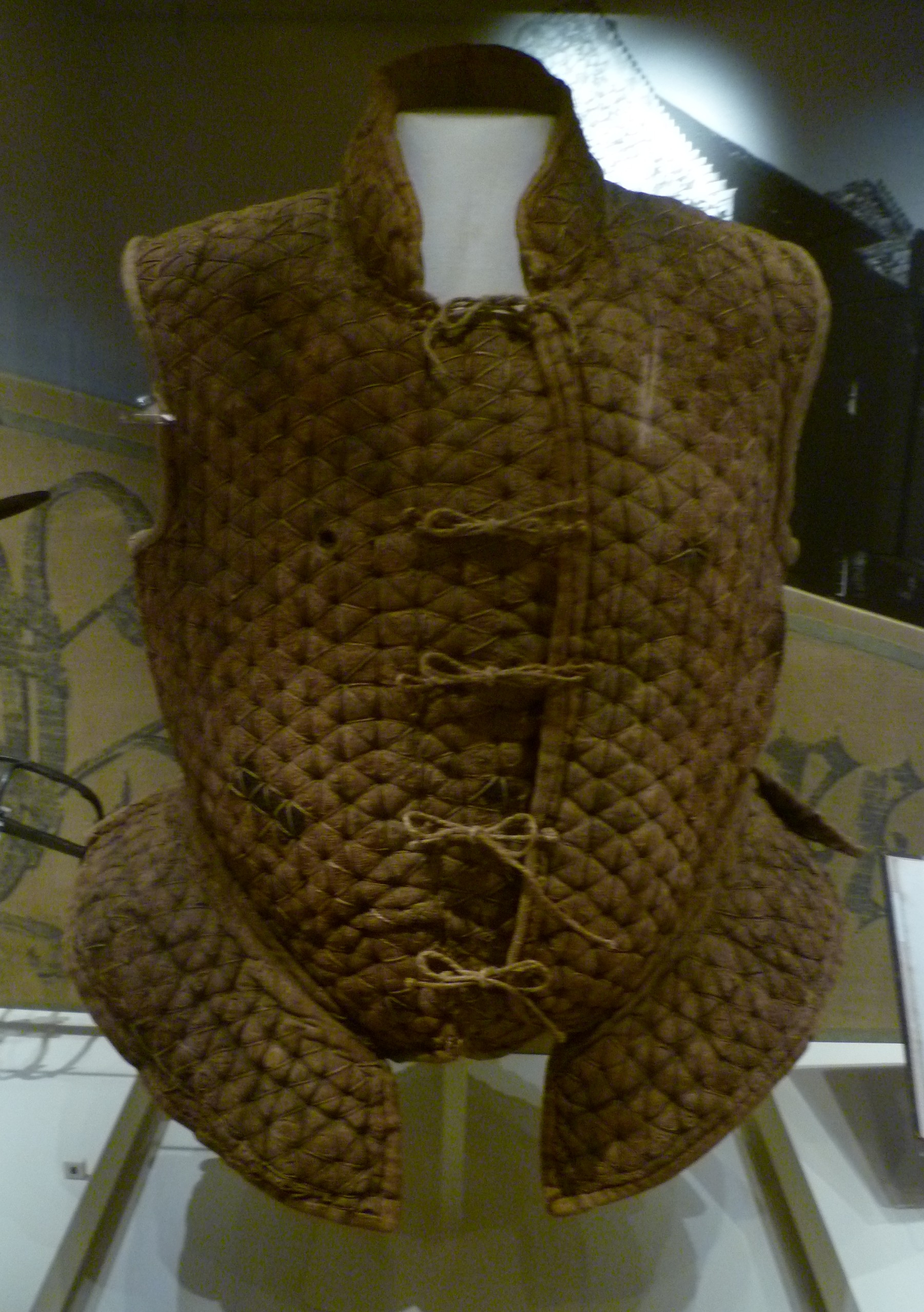
A leather jack of the kind worn by reivers in the 16th century

A special body of law, known as March law or Border law, developed in the region. The legal historian Cynthia Neville notes that the system of Border law "borrowed freely from several legal traditions: common law, ...military law, and the principles of equity." Under border law, a person who had been raided had the right to mount a counter-raid within six days, even across the border, to recover his goods. This "hot trod" had to proceed with "hound and horne, hew and cry", making a racket and carrying a piece of burning turf on a spear point to openly announce their purpose came in about 1451, to distinguish themselves from unlawful raiders proceeding covertly. They might use a sleuth hound (also known as a "slew dogge") to follow raiders' tracks. These dogs were valuable, and part of the established forces (on the English side of the border, at least). Any person meeting this counter-raid was required to ride along and offer such help as he could, on pain of being considered complicit with the raiders. The trod mounted after six days was known as "cold trod" was an innovation appearing in 1424. Officers such as the Deputy Warden of the English West March had the specific duty of "following the trod". Feuds could be tolerated or even rule driven - like murdering of outlaw Surname members or those caught in the process of raiding (known as red-handed) should not be cause of a vendatta. The 'right of reprisal' was allowed in cases where a resolution was not found within six months.

In Northumberland, law and order was said to be difficult to maintain because so many were unwilling to give evidence against their own servants or neighbours and so many were aiding and abetting the defendants.

The most common method of execution was hanging, sometimes beheadings were made, but also drownings. Special drowning pit were sometimes made for drownings. Mass hangings and drownings also were used for executions.

=== March wardens ===
The earliest known reference to the office of Warden of the Marches dates from the period of the Scottish Wars of Independence. The march wardens' various duties included the maintenance of patrols, watches and garrisons to deter raiding from the other kingdom. The role of the Warden evolved over time. By the late 14th century, it had become a formalized, salaried position, held both in times of peace and war. This was very much reliant on the ability of the warden's personal strength in men or manraed, loyalty of local gentry and personal wealth. On occasion, march wardens could make warden roades to recover loot, and to make a point to raiders and officials. A degree of reiving and banditry among the gentry was tolerated in return for their service on the frontier. Wardens sometimes chose to overlook certain criminal activities, referred to at the time as "winking at", provided they received a share of the proceeds. Summary executions, referred to in the Borderlands as "Jeddart Justice", were occasionally employed by Wardens for suspected thieves and murderers. (Note: It was recorded that in Northumberland there existed a custom recorded in the 13th century whereby a killer who confessed to a coroner could be decapitated without trial. See England's Northern Frontier by Jackson W. Armstrong (2021), p298-299)

March wardens (and the lesser officers such as keepers of fortified places) were rarely effective at maintaining the law. The Scottish wardens were usually borderers themselves, and were complicit in raiding. They almost invariably showed favour to their own kindred, which caused jealousy and even hatred among other Scottish border families. Many English officers were from southern counties in England and often could not command the loyalty or respect of their locally recruited subordinates or the local population. Feuds could also form between Wardens on the same side of the Border, like between Thomas Scrope, Warden of the English West March, and Ralph Eure, Warden of the English Middle March.

==== Days of march ====
Days of march (also known as days of truce) were events held at particular agreed locations by Wardens in which a panel of men heard of accusations of criminality and determined offences. (Note: The Anglo-Scottish frontier was not alone, similar border meetings were held in Wales, Ireland and Gascony. See England's Northern Frontier by Jackson W. Armstrong (2021), p185) It provided redress for wrong-doing, particularly cross-border raiding, kidnapping, ransoming and murder. It was not unknown for violence to break out even at such truce days. It was not until the 1450s that the March Day courts were formalised in a manner resembling their operation in the Tudor period.

=== Legislation ===
In 1606 an act (4 Jas. 1. c. 1) to assist the recent Union of the Crowns was enacted; it was long titled An act for the utter abolition of all memory of hostility, and the dependence thereof, between England and Scotland, and for repressing of occasions of disorders, and disorders in time to come. The act repealed nine English laws enacted over the previous centuries and considered hostile to Scotland; the repeal became effective when 13 Scottish laws considered hostile to England had been repealed. Three years later an act (7 Jas. 1. c. 1) dealing with criminal law in the border region was enacted; it was long titled An act for the better execution of justice, and suppressing of criminal offenders, in the north parts of the kingdom of England. To deal with cross-border flight, the act allowed the trial of an Englishman in Scotland if the felony was committed there, and he was later arrested in England; it became effective after a similar act had been passed in Scotland.

Following the Restoration and long-running lawlessness by Moss troopers nearly six decades later, parliament passed the Moss Troopers Act 1662 (14 Cha. 2. c. 22) for the border area; it was long titled An Act for preventing of Theft and Rapine upon the Northern Borders of England. Section seven of the act revives both previous acts passed under James I. With the 1662 act about to expire, the sixth session of Cavalier Parliament passed the Moss Troopers Act 1666 (18 & 19 Cha. 2. c. 3), long titled An Act to continue a former Act for preventing of Thefte and Rapine upon the Northerne Borders of England. Under section two of the act, the benefit of clergy was taken away from those convicted (generally meaning a death sentence), or otherwise, the notorious thieves and spoil-takers in Northumberland or Cumberland were to be transported to America, "there to remaine and not to returne".

Generally associated with several historic events of the period, as well as continuing lawlessness, or the consideration of insufficient government control to prevent "theft and rapine upon the northern borders of England", these acts were repeatedly continued over the next 80 years. The initial acts include the Moss Trooper Act 1677 (29 & 30 Cha. 2. c. 2), the Moss Trooper Act 1685 (1 Ja. 2. c. 14), the Moss Trooper Act 1695 (7 & 8 Will. 3. c. 17), the Moss Trooper Act 1700 (12 & 13 Will. 3. c. 6), and the Moss Trooper Act 1712 (12 Ann. c. 10). Starting in 1732, although the 'Moss trooper' short title was dropped, the enforcement acts were continued by other variously named acts, most of which continued the established descriptive phrase "for preventing theft and rapine upon the northern borders of England", as the first item included. These later acts include the Perpetuation of Various Laws Act 1732 (6 Geo. 2. c. 37), the Universities (Wine Licences) Act 1743 (17 Geo. 2. c. 40), and the Continuance of Laws Act 1750 (24 Geo. 2. c. 57), which continued previous acts until 1 September 1757 "and from thence to the end of the then next session of parliament".

== Border Surnames ==
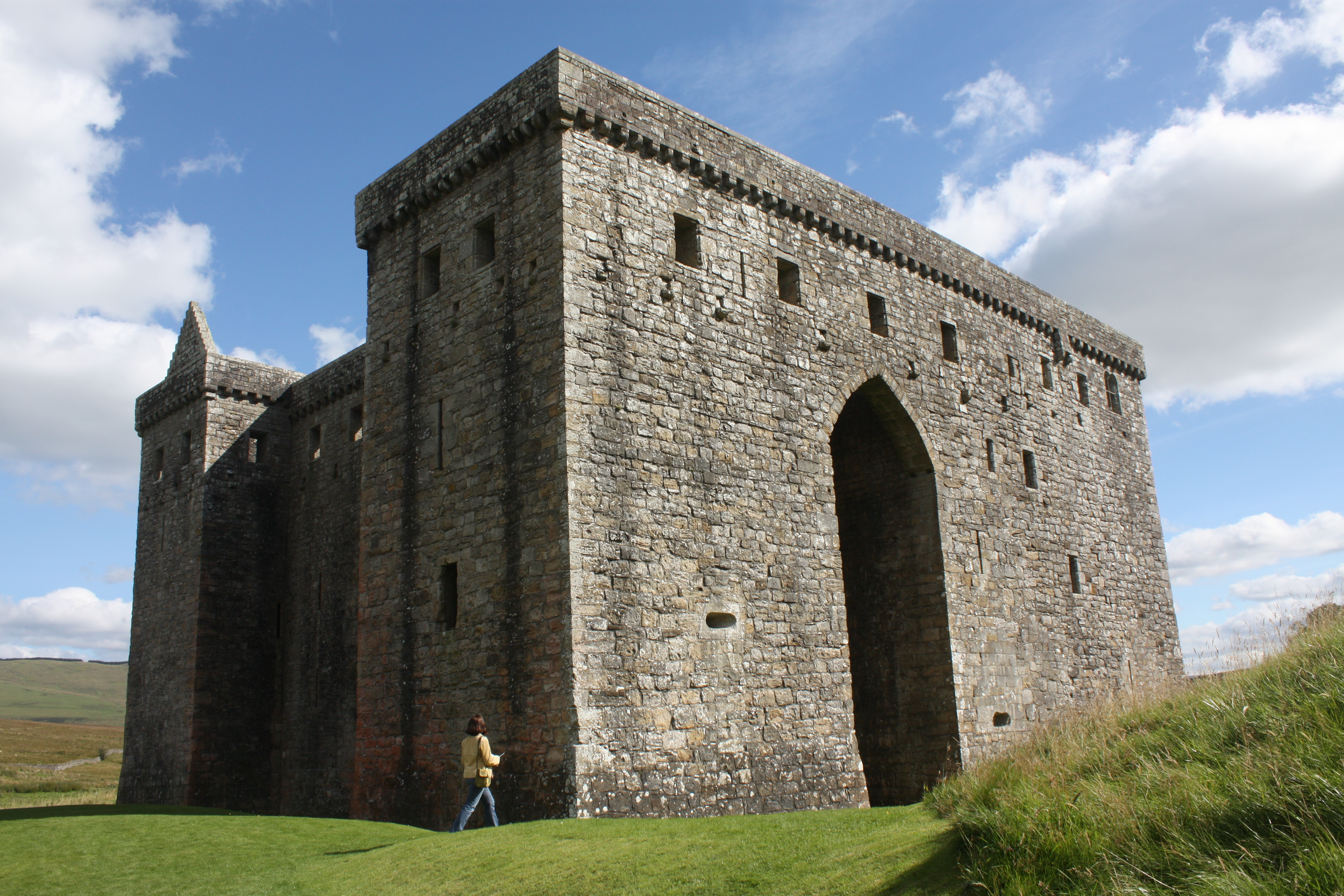
Hermitage Castle, the strength of Liddesdale and an important stronghold for the Scottish Marches. Its holder, the Keeper of Liddesdale, usually had equal status to the Scottish Wardens of the Marches.

In the Borders, kinship bonds were of greater importance and were typically stronger horizontally, among siblings and cousins, whereas elsewhere lineage held greater significance. These familial groups emerged during a period of sustained conflict, particularly following the Wars of Scottish Independence, where the need for organised, often violent, defence and raiding operations reshaped social and political structures along the frontier. Kinship bonds could override differences in social status in cases of violent offences. Branches of families lived sometimes three to four households under one heidsman who accounted for their defence.

What we may conceptually understand as 'Border reiver' Surnames first appear in English records in 1498 and in Scottish records in 1516; though there is an earlier record in 1455, as freindis and surname, in a Scottish source. Furthermore, records from Westmorland in 1403-6 mention la graund paurantee (extended kindred) in connection with acts of violence and threats. Similarly, a source from Northumberland dated 1428 refers to kyn alyance and frends, a term that also appears in Westmorland sources in the latter half of the fifteenth century. A similar formulation of "...kyned and allied...' is found in the late 1520s between for the relationship between the 6th Earl of Northumberland and the rebel and gentleman bandit Sir William Lisle. The first Surnames recorded 1498 were in a royal precept issued to the sheriff of Northumberland that the term "Surnames" was used to describe certain families inhabiting Liberty of Tynedale and Redesdale. This was not the first time that non-noble surnames had been recorded in the Borders, as the Charltons first appear in the fourteenth century, and many others including Bell, Graham, Dodd etc. To note, Clan was first used in a Scottish source in 1498 for Border kinship groups, but later Surname became predominate proper noun. Some Surnames were landed and officeholders like Fenwick; and like the Surname Graham mixed with unlanded people.

Armstrong, Bell, Elliot, Dodds, Graham and Hall, for example, had branches of their Surname on both sides of the border; this didn't necessarily lead to cross-border kinship ties. Major landowners, like the Percys and Dacres, could also hold kinship ties with Surnames.

A variety of terms describe the Border families, such as the "Riding Surnames" and the "Graynes" thereof. Alongside the standard surnames, a distinct class of 'gentleman' Surnames emerged, highlighting that clannism, self-defence, and clan loyalty were not limited to poorer highland communities. The Surnames could be broken down into smaller community groups, for example in the 1520s, the Charltons of Tynedale were made up of 'Bands': Hesleyside, Billingham, Shitlington, and the Bower; The heidsmen of these bands often vied for dominance, with one temporarily rising to power, only for another to emerge as circumstances shifted and the influence of their predecessors waned.

It can perhaps be equated to the system of the Highland Clans and their septs. e.g. Clan Donald and Clan MacDonald of Sleat, can be compared with the Scotts of Buccleuch and the Scotts of Harden and elsewhere. The first English source to compare the Surnames to clans appears in 1506. Both Border Graynes and Highland septs, however, had the essential feature of patriarchal leadership by the chief of the name, known as 'Heidsman' (headsman) in the Borders and had territories in which most of their kindred lived. The term 'heidsman' first appears on the Scottish-side in the 15th century, before being first found in English sources in the 16th century.

=== Surnames in the Marches of Scotland (1587) ===
In 1587, the Parliament of Scotland passed a statute: "For the quieting and keping in obiedince of the disorderit subjectis inhabitantis of the borders hielands and Ilis." Attached to the statute was a roll of surnames from both the Border country and Highlands. The Borders portion listed 17 clannis with a chief and their associated Marches:

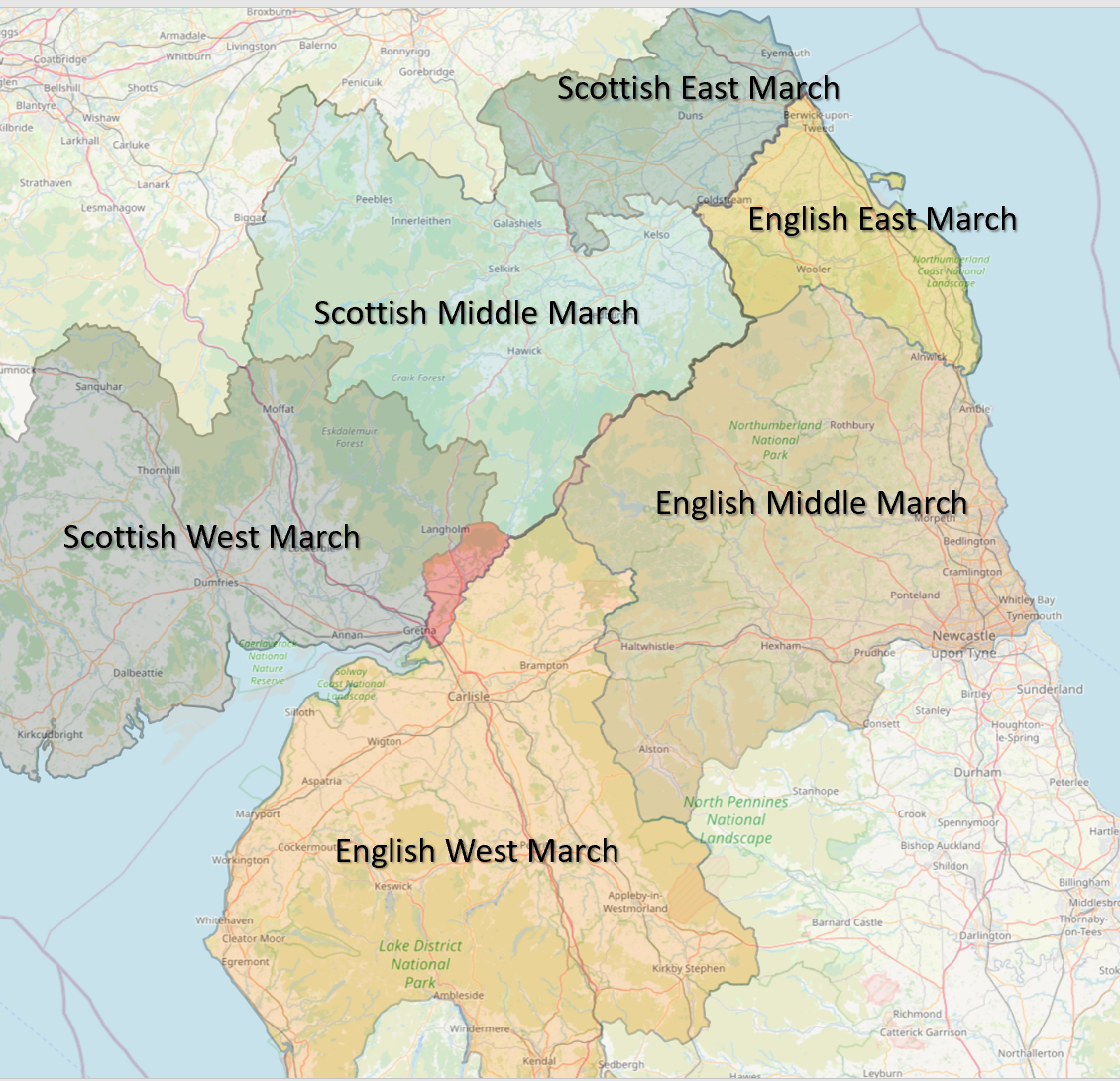
Regions of the Scottish marches

Middle March

- Elliot, Armstrong, Nixon, Crozier

West March

- Scott, Bates, Little, Thomsons, Glendenning, Irving, Bell, Carruthers, Graham, Johnstone, Jardine, Moffat, and Latimer.

Of the border clans or Graynes listed on this roll, Elliot, Carruthers, Scott, Irvine, Graham, Johnstone, Jardine and Moffat are registered with the Court of the Lord Lyon in Edinburgh as Scottish Clans, thus clans with Lord Lyon recognized chiefs. Others such as Armstrong, Little, Bell, and Clan Blackadder are considered armigerous clans, an unofficial term used to describe clans that once had a Lord Lyon recognized Chief.

The historic riding surnames recorded by George MacDonald Fraser in The Steel Bonnets (London: Harvill, 1989) are:

East March

- Scotland: Hume, Trotter, Dixon, Bromfield, Craw, Cranston.
- England: Forster, Selby, Gray, Dunn.

Middle March

- Scotland: Burns, Kerr, Young, Pringle, Davison, Gilchrist, Tait of East Teviotdale. Scott, Oliver, Turnbull, Rutherford of West Teviotdale. Armstrong, Croser, Elliot, Nixon, Douglas, Laidlaw, Routledge, Turner, Henderson of Liddesdale.
- England: Anderson, Potts, Reed, Hall, Hedley of Redesdale. Charlton, Robson, Dodd, Dodds, Milburn, Yarrow, Stapleton of Tynedale. Also Fenwick, Ogle, Heron, Witherington, Medford (later Mitford), Collingwood, Carnaby, Shaftoe, Ridley, Stokoe, Stamper, Wilkinson, Hunter, Huntley, Thomson, Jamieson.

West March

- Scotland: Bell, Irvine, Irving, Johnstone, Maxwell, Carlisle, Beattie, Little, Carruthers, Glendenning, Routledge, Moffat.
- England: Graham, Hetherington, Musgrave, Storey, Lowther, Curwen, Salkeld, Dacre, Harden, Hodgson, Routledge, Tailor, Noble.

Relationships between the border clans varied from uneasy alliance to open, deadly feud. It took little to start a feud; a chance quarrel or misuse of office was sufficient. Feuds might continue for years until patched up in the face of invasion from the other kingdoms or when the outbreak of other feuds caused alliances to shift. The border was easily destabilised if Graynes from opposite sides of the border were at feud. Feuds also provided ready excuse for particularly murderous raids or pursuits.

Riders did not wear identifying tartans. The tradition of family tartans dates from the Victorian era and was inspired by the novels of Sir Walter Scott. The typical dress of reivers included Jack of plate, steel bonnets (helmets), and riding boots.

== Elaborate nicknames ==
The Border reivers are well known for their distinctive and often colourful nicknames, which likely emerged due to the widespread use of common surnames and first names such as John, Jock, or Will among the Border clans. Nicknames were originally known as 'eke-names' or 'to-names.' These nicknames served as a practical means to distinguish individuals in a society where shared names were prevalent.

These monikers often reflected a strong emphasis on lineage and close kinship, adhering to patterns of patrilineal descent, such as Dick's Davy, Rowy's Will and Will's Jock Graham. Sometimes this was extended to three names Gibb's Geordie's Francis could be matrilineal like Bessie's Andrew. These extended patronymic to-names are far more common west of the Pennines, on the English side of the border. Jackson Armstrong has speculated that this distribution may represent an echo of the region's Brythonic past.

Physical traits or injuries inspired other nicknames, such as Jock "Half-Lugs" (Half-ears) Elliot, "Sweet Milk" (beautiful), "Fingerless" Will Nixon, "Nebless" (Noseless) Clem Crozier or "Gleed John" (gleed meaning blind or partially blind) William "Weykespere" Hedley or "Wynking Will," or 'Monoculus' [one-eyed] William Elward [Elliot] found in records dating back to 1389.

Another nickname, "Na Gudpriest" John Oliver, suggests the thief had once worked for the church.

Nicknames like Jock "a God's Name" Elliot, "Skinabake", "As-it-Looks" or Archie "Fire-the-Brays," or "Hodde" Hall Robert Elward [Elliot] "Zongridar", 'Gerald with the Prik' and Davidson called 'Grace behind him' cannot be explained easily.

At times, a nickname could be applied multiple times to different individuals, creating confusion or ambiguity. For instance, the moniker Black Jock was used for two different men named Johnny Armstrong, while Black Ormiston referred to two possibly distinct Ormistons.

Others, like "Buggerback," "The Lady Elliot," "The Lady Scott," "The Lady Kerr," "Bang-tail," and "Sym 'the Lady'," remain subjects of speculation. These names may have reflected an alternative sexuality as we understand it today or held layered meanings tied to identity, humour or camaraderie within the close-knit, often male-dominated culture of the Border Reivers.

== In literature ==
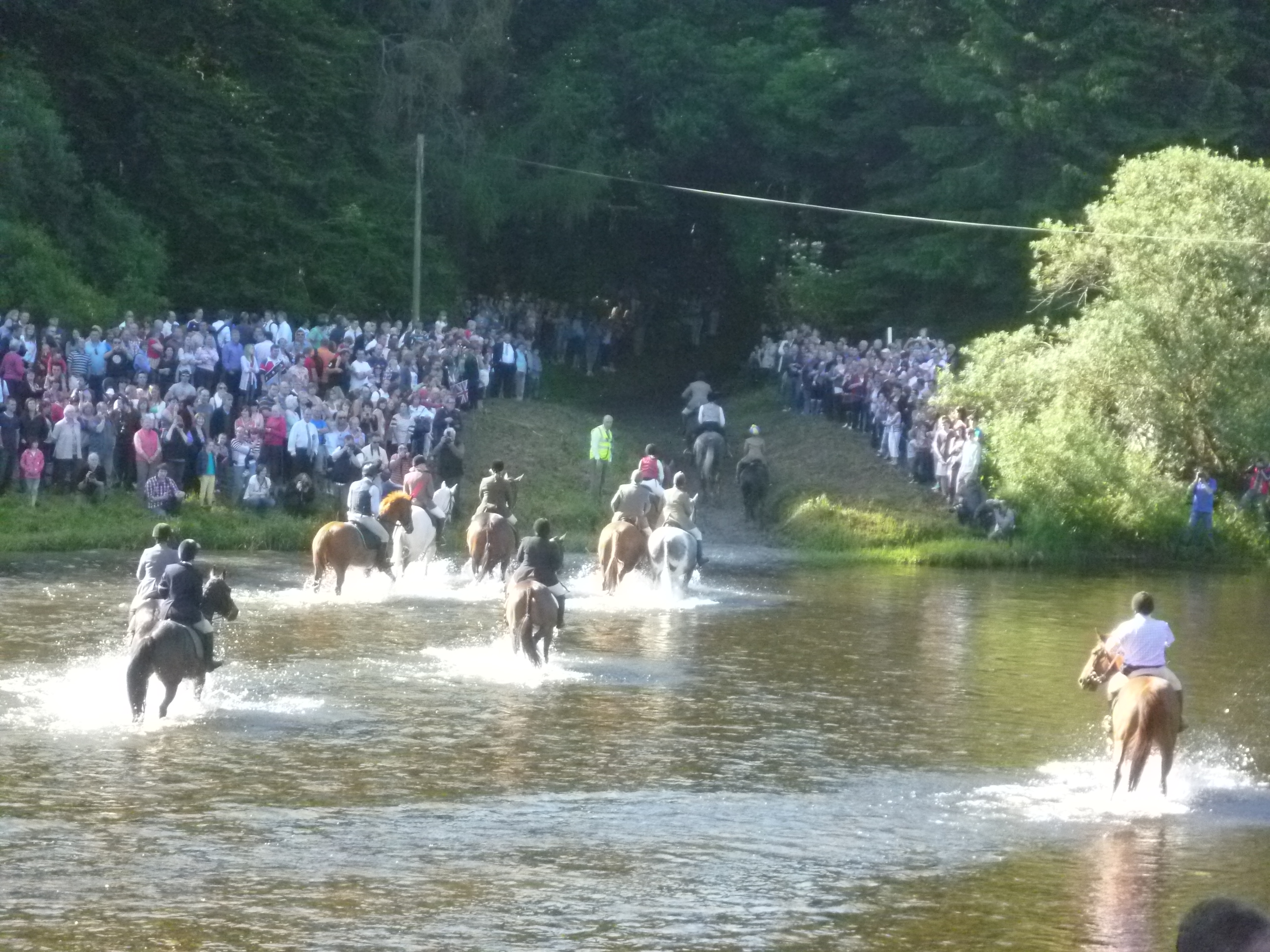
Skills of horsemanship are kept alive in the Borders: fording the River Tweed on Braw Lad's Day, Galashiels 2011.

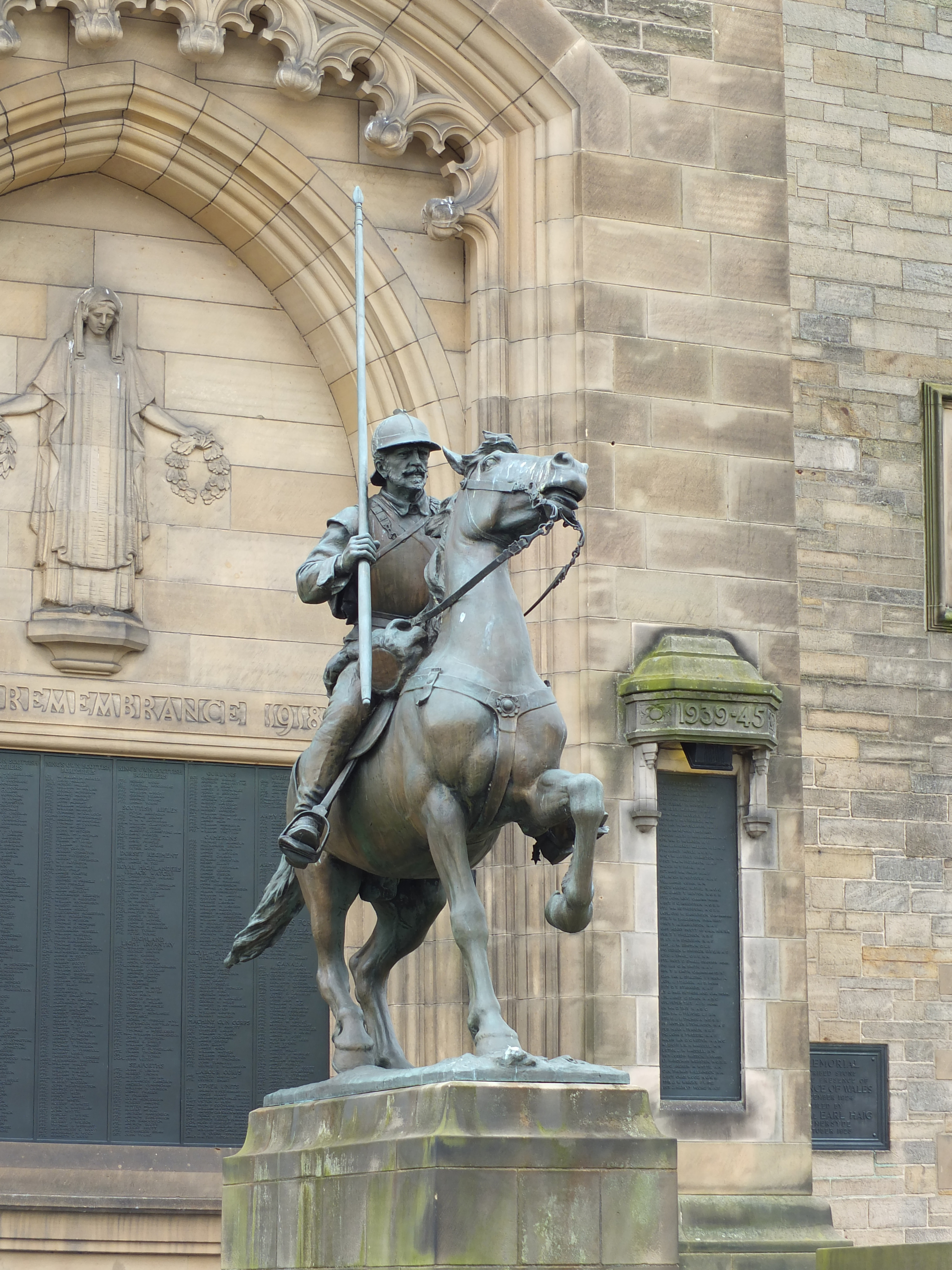
Reiver statue at Galashiels

The reivers were romanticised by writers such as Sir Walter Scott (Minstrelsy of the Scottish Border), although he also used the term Moss-trooper, which refers to seventeenth-century borderland brigands. Scott was himself a native of the borders, writing down histories which had been passed on in folk tradition or ballad.

Robert Greene, the popular Elizabethan dramatist and pamphleteer and rival to William Shakespeare, wrote in his play The Scottish History of James the Fourth, 'Bohan, a Scot, attired like a Redesdale man’ (1.1.1 s.d.), showing that Elizabethan dramatists were well aware of the Borderers.

English poet William Wordsworth's verse play The Borderers features border reivers (but does not use this term).

The stories of legendary border reivers like Kinmont Willie Armstrong were often retold in folk-song as Border ballads. There are also local legends, such as the "Dish of Spurs" which would be served to a border chieftain of the Charltons to remind him that the larder was empty and it was time to raid again. Scottish author Nigel Tranter revisited these themes in his historical and contemporary novels. Scottish Border poet, and Australian bush balladeer, Will H. Ogilvie (1869–1963) wrote several poems about the reivers, including "The reiver's heart" (1903), "The raiders" (1904), "Whaup o' the rede: a ballad of the border raiders" (1909), "Kirkhope Tower" (1913), and "Ho! for the blades of Harden". The Steel Bonnets (1971) by George MacDonald Fraser (1925–2008) describes life in the Anglo-Scottish border marches in the heyday of the border reivers.

== In modern times ==
The names of the Reiver families are still very much apparent among the inhabitants of the Scottish Borders, Northumbria and Cumbria today. Reiving families (particularly those large or brutal enough to carry significant influence) have left the local population passionate about their territory on both sides of the Border. Newspapers have described the local cross-border rugby fixtures as "annual re-runs of the bloody Battle of Otterburn." Despite this there has been much cross-border migration since the Pacification of the Borders, and families that were once Scots now identify themselves as English and vice versa.

Hawick in Scotland holds an annual Reivers' festival as do the Schomberg Society in Kilkeel, Northern Ireland (the two often co-operate). The summer festival in the Borders town of Duns is headed by the "Reiver" and "Reiver's Lass", a young man and young woman elected from the inhabitants of the town and surrounding area. The Ulster-Scots Agency's first two leaflets from the 'Scots Legacy' series feature the story of the historic Ulster tartan and the origins of the kilt and the Border Reivers.

Borderers (particularly those banished by James VI of Scotland) took part in the plantation of Ulster, becoming the people known as Ulster-Scots (Scotch-Irish in America). Reiver descendants can be found throughout Ulster.

Border surnames can also be found throughout the major areas of Scotch-Irish settlement in the United States, and particularly in the Appalachian region. In 1790, the combined total of people of Scottish, Northern English or Protestant Irish origin may have been as high as 51% of the white population in North Carolina and 53% in South Carolina. The historian David Hackett Fischer (1989) has shown in detail how the Anglo-Scottish border culture became rooted in parts of the United States, especially the Upland South. John Russell Bartlett in his Dictionary of Americanisms (1848) records the criminal law term "black-mail" (now blackmail), which has its origins in Border reiver culture. Author George MacDonald Fraser wryly observed or imagined Border traits and names among controversial people in modern American history: Presidents Lyndon B. Johnson and Richard Nixon, among others. It is also noted that, in 1969, a descendant of the Borderers, Neil Armstrong, was the first person to set foot on the Moon. In 1972 Armstrong was made a freeman of the town of Langholm in Scotland, the home of his ancestors.

The artist Gordon Young created a public art work in Carlisle: Cursing Stone and Reiver Pavement, a nod to Gavin Dunbar, the Archbishop of Glasgow's 1525 Monition of Cursing. Names of Reiver families are set into the paving of a walkway which connects Tullie House Museum to Carlisle Castle under a main road, and part of the bishop's curse is displayed on a 14-ton granite boulder.

== See also ==
- Debatable Lands
- History of Northumberland
- The Borderers (television series)

== Sources ==
- Durham, Keith; McBride, Angus (1995). The Border Reivers: The story of the Anglo-Scottish borderlands. Osprey Publishing. ISBN 1-85532-417-2.
- Ellis, Steven G. (1989). Tudor frontiers and noble power: the making of the British state. Oxford: Clarendon Press.
- Fischer, David Hackett (1989). Albion's Seed: Four British Folkways in America. Oxford and New York: Oxford University Press.
- Goodwin, George (2013). Fatal Rivalry: Flodden 1513. London: Phoenix. ISBN 978-1-78022-136-6.
- Grundy, John (2022). History of Northumberland. Newcastle upon Tyne: Tyne Bridge Publishing. ISBN 9781838280970.
- James, Mervyn (Mervyn Evans) (1986). Society, politics, and culture : studies in early modern England. Cambridge: Cambridge University Press. ISBN 978-0-521-36877-3.
- King, Andy (2001). War, Politics, and Landed Society in Northumberland, c.1296-c.1408 (PhD). Durham University.
- MacDonald Fraser, George (1998). The Steel Bonnets. HarperCollins. ISBN 0-00-272746-3.
- Moffat, Alistair (2008). The Reivers. Edinburgh: Birlinn. ISBN 978-1-84158-674-8.
- Moss, Tom (2007). Deadlock and Deliverance: The Capture and Rescue of Kinmont Willie Armstrong. Rose Cottage Publications. ISBN 978-0-9558016-0-0.
- Neville, Cynthia J. (1998). Violence, custom and law : the Anglo-Scottish border lands in the later middle ages. Edinburgh: Edinburgh University Press. ISBN 0-7486-1073-1.
- Steingraber, Aubrey Maria (2022). Landscape and the Making of the Medieval Anglo-Scottish Border: Power, Place, and Perspective c.1200-c.1500 (PhD). University of York.
- Tait, Jon (2018). Dick the Devil's Bairns: Breaking the Border Mafia. Tredition. ISBN 978-3-7482-2361-0.
- Trevelyan, G. M. (1942). English Social History. London: Longmans, Green and Co. Ltd.
