= Craw =

Craw may refer to:

- Craw (band), a math rock band from Cleveland, Ohio
- Craw (surname), a surname (includes list)
- Crop (anatomy), or craw, an anatomical structure
- CRA-W (organization), the Committee on the Status of Women in Computing Research
- CRAW (industrial certification), a Certified Robotic Arc Welder, per the American Welding Society (A.W.S.)
- Crayfish, a crustacean
