= Hetherington =

The surname Hetherington is of English origin, derived from a like-named place in Northumberland. This placename is derived from Old English word elements—either hēahdēor ("stag", "deer"), or hǣddre ("heather"); in addition to the elements -ing ("characterized by"), and tūn ("farmstead", "settlement"). Early occurrences of the surname in English records are: de Hetherington (in 1298), de Hetherynton (in 1316), and Etherington (in 1672). A variant form of the surname is Heatherington, and perhaps Hetherton. Forms of the surname have been recorded in Ireland since the 16th century.

Hetherington can refer to:

== People ==
- Alastair Hetherington (1919–1999), British journalist
- Amelia Hetherington (1862-1939), Australia Mayoress
- Sir Arthur Hetherington (1911–2002), first chairman of British Gas
- Brian Hetherington (born 1954), Australian rugby league footballer
- Chris Hetherington (born 1972), American football fullback
- Dar Heatherington (born 1963), Canadian Politician
- Sir Hector Hetherington (1888–1965), philosopher and Principal of the University of Glasgow
- Henry Hetherington (1792–1849), British Chartist
- Ian Hetherington (1952–2021), British computer specialist
- Jason Hetherington (born 1970), Australian rugby league footballer
- Jill Hetherington (born 1964), Canadiahn professional tennis player
- John Hetherington (haberdasher), English haberdasher
- John Hetherington, Australian Mayor of Brisbane
- Jos Hetherington (1892–1971), English footballer
- Judson Hetherington (1866–1928), physician and politician
- Kathleen Hetherington, American college administrator
- Norman Hetherington (1921–2010), Australian cartoonist and puppeteer
- Rachel Hetherington (born 1972), Australian professional golfer
- Richard Hetherington (1785–1859), British naval officer and politician
- Roger Hetherington (1908–1990), British civil engineer
- Roger Gaskell Hetherington (1876–1952), British civil engineer and civil servant
- Stephen Hetherington (born 1959), Australian philosopher
- Thomas Hetherington (1926–2007), British lawyer
- Thomas Hetherington (politician) (1815–1913), Canadian politician
- Thomas Gerard Hetherington (1886–1951), British officer who helped develop the tank
- Tim Hetherington (1970–2011), British photographer, winner of 2007 World Press Photo
- Rev William Maxwell Hetherington FRSE (1803–1865), Scottish minister and historian

== Other ==
- 2011 Hetherington House Occupation
- 6127 Hetherington, an asteroid
