= Moresby (surname) =

Moresby is a surname. Notable people with the surname include:

- Tracy Moresby (1867–?), New Zealand cricketer
- Elizabeth Louisa Moresby (1862–1931), British novelist
- Fairfax Moresby (1786–1877), British admiral
- George Moresby-White (fl. 1933–1952), British playwright and screenwriter
- John Moresby (1830–1922), British admiral
- Robert Moresby (1794–1854 or 1863), British naval captain and hydrographer
