= Ogles =

Ogles is a surname. Notable people with the surname include:

- Andy Ogles (born 1971), American politician from Tennessee
- Benjamin M. Ogles (born 1961), American professor and university administrator
- Brandon Ogles (born 1976), American politician from Tennessee
- Mark Ogles (born 1962), American politician from Florida

== See also ==
- Ogle (surname)
