= Ewesdale =

Glen in Dumfries and Galloway, Scotland

Coordinates: 55.202°N 2.991°W

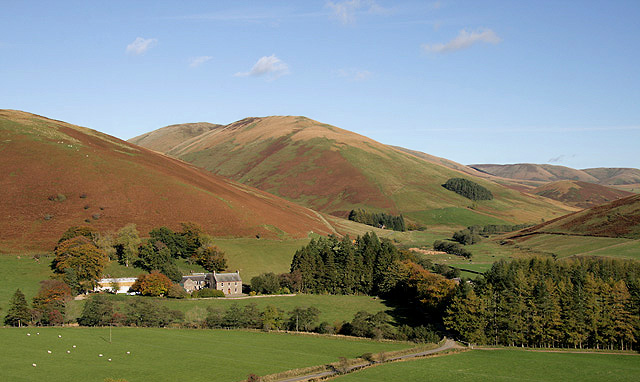
Burnfoot Farm, Ewesdale

Ewesdale is a glen and former lordship in Dumfries and Galloway, Scotland. The Ewes Water runs through the valley from its source at Mosspaul until it enters the River Esk at Langholm. The A7 Road, which runs through the valley from Langholm and continues to Hawick, was built in the 18th century at the initiative of Sir William Pulteney.
