= Liberty of Tynedale =

The Liberty of Tynedale was a regional unit of government on the border of the medieval Kingdoms of England and Scotland. It was an estate of the Scottish Kings within England, a situation that resulted in many years of confusion over the sovereignty of the area.

The liberty was created in 1157, although it may have existed in some form in the tenth century. It was governed by the monarch of Scotland as a fief of England until the death of Alexander III, when it reverted to English rule. In 1414 the secular liberties were integrated into Common Law. The liberty was first incorporated into the shire of Northumberland during the reign of Henry VII and was later abolished entirely under Henry VIII.

The Liberty of Tynedale, along with its neighbour, the Liberty of Redesdale was a known haunt of outlaws. Indeed, in 1441, both liberties conspired to attack as far as Ripon and Boroughbridge in Yorkshire. In 1509, again both liberties work together to attack the city of Newcastle under the direction of Tynemouth Priory.

During the 16th century, and likely before, the Surname Charlton was estimated to controlling half the population, whilst Robson controlling about a quarter, with the rest made up of Dodds and Milbournes (Milburns).

The lead- and silver-mining area of Alston Moor, associated with the Liberty since at least the tenth century was alienated from Tynedale and added to the new county of Carliol in 1147 for financial reasons.

Secular liberties operated semi-independently, granting local lords significant autonomy to enforce laws and defend their territories. Neighbouring Redesdale also had a liberty. These secular liberties were frequently accused of, and shown to house troublemakers.

== Sources ==
- Robertson, Alastair (1999). A History of Alston Moor. Alston, Cumbria: Hundy Publications.
- Robson, Ralph (1989). The English Highland Clans: Tudor Responses to a Mediaeval Problem. Edinburgh: John Donald Publishers.
