= Jos Hetherington =

English footballer

Personal information
- Full name: Joseph Hetherington
- Date of birth: 11 April 1892
- Place of birth: Sunderland, England
- Date of death: 3 March 1973
- Position: Centre forward

Senior career*
Years	Team	Apps	(Gls)
1914–1919	Sunderland Royal Rovers		
1919–1920	Southwick (Co Durham)		
1920–1924	South Shields	64	(15)
1924–1925	Preston North End	5	(0)
1925–1926	Lincoln City	3	(1)
1926–1927	Durham City	0	(0)
1927–1928	Norwich City	1	(0)
1928–1930	Guildford City		
1930	Walker Celtic		
1930	Sunderland Employment Exchange		
Total		73	(16)
- * Club domestic league appearances and goals

Joseph Hetherington (11 April 1892 – 3 March 1973) was an English footballer who played in the Football League for Lincoln City, Preston North End, Norwich City and South Shields.
