= Craw (surname) =

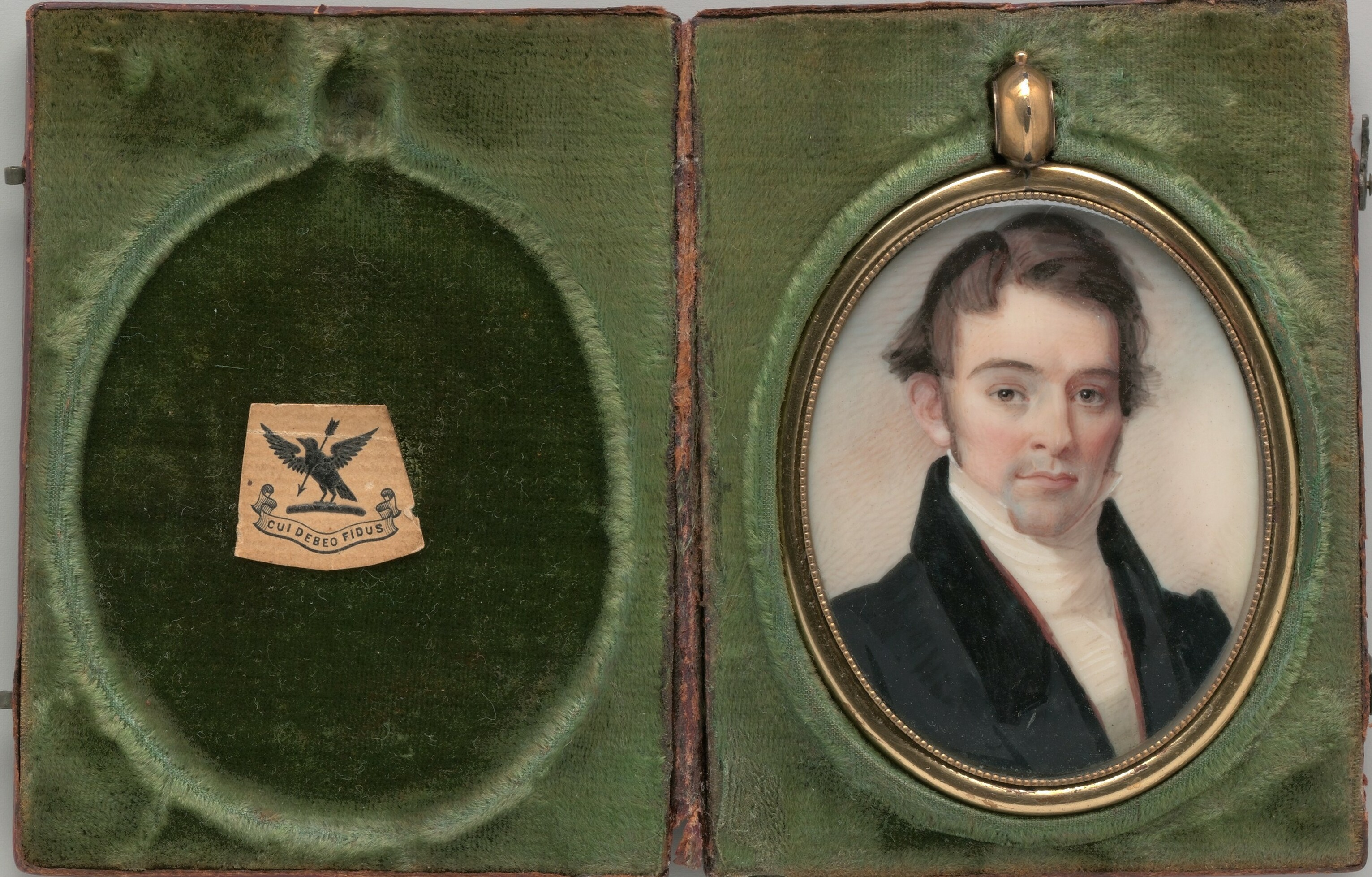
George Catlin portrait of a Gentleman of the Craw surname with motto: God is My safety

Craw is an English habitational name that arrived in Britain with Anglo-Saxon tribes. Residents of the village Cronkshaw in the county of Lancashire adopted Craw as their surname.

== List of persons with the surname ==
- Demas T. Craw (1900–1942), United States Army Air Forces colonel awarded the Medal of Honor for action in World War II
- Garvie Craw (1948–2007), American football player
- Pavel Kravař (c. 1391–1433), or Paul Craw, Bohemian Hussite emissary burned at the stake
- Charles D. Craw (c. 1941), Retired Naval Chief Petty Officer out of the U.S.S. Sea Robin (SS 407).
