= Anglo-Scottish border =

96-mile long border in Great Britain

- Border as shown on the East Coast Main Line, with the Flag of England, the Tudor rose and the lion marking entry into England, and the Flag of Scotland, the thistle and the unicorn marking entry into Scotland.

Characteristics
- Entities: England; Scotland
- Length: 96 miles (154 km)

History
- Established: 25 September 1237; Signing of the Treaty of York
- Current shape: 1999; Scottish Adjacent Waters Boundaries Order 1999
- Treaties: Treaty of York; Treaty of Newcastle 1244; Treaty of Union 1706

The Anglo-Scottish border is a land boundary that separates England and Scotland on the island of Great Britain. Though separating two countries and legal systems, it is an internal border of the United Kingdom. It runs for 96 miles (154 km) between Marshall Meadows Bay on the east coast and the Solway Firth in the west. It is known colloquially as "the border" in the whole of Scotland and the English counties of Cumbria and Northumberland.

The Firth of Forth was the border between the Picto-Gaelic Kingdom of Alba and the Anglian Kingdom of Northumbria in the early 10th century. It became the first Anglo-Scottish border with the annexation of Northumbria by Anglo-Saxon England in the mid-10th century. In 973, the Scottish king Kenneth II attended the English king Edgar the Peaceful at Edgar's council in Chester. After Kenneth had reportedly done homage, Edgar rewarded Kenneth by granting him Lothian. Despite this transaction, the control of Lothian was not finally settled and the region was taken by the Scots at the Battle of Carham in 1018 and the River Tweed became the de facto Anglo-Scottish border. The Solway–Tweed line was legally established in 1237 by the Treaty of York between England and Scotland. It remains the border today, with the exception of the Debatable Lands, north of Carlisle, and a small area around Berwick-upon-Tweed, which was taken by England in 1482. Berwick was not fully annexed into England until 1746, by the Wales and Berwick Act 1746.

For centuries until the Union of the Crowns, the region on either side of the boundary was a lawless territory suffering from the repeated raids in each direction of the Border Reivers. Following the Treaty of Union 1706, ratified by the Acts of Union 1707, which united Scotland with England and Wales to form the Kingdom of Great Britain, the Border forms the boundary of the two legal systems as the treaty between Scotland and England guaranteed the continued separation of English law and Scots law. The age of marriage under Scots law is 16, while it is 18 under English law. The border settlements of Gretna Green to the west, and Coldstream and Lamberton to the east, were convenient for elopers from England who wanted to marry under Scottish laws, and marry without publicity.

The marine boundary was adjusted by the Scottish Adjacent Waters Boundaries Order 1999 so that the boundary within the territorial waters (up to the 12-mile (19 km) limit) is 90 metres (300 ft) north of the boundary for oil installations established by the Civil Jurisdiction (Offshore Activities) Order 1987. The land border is near and roughly parallel to the 420 million-year-old Iapetus Suture.

== History ==
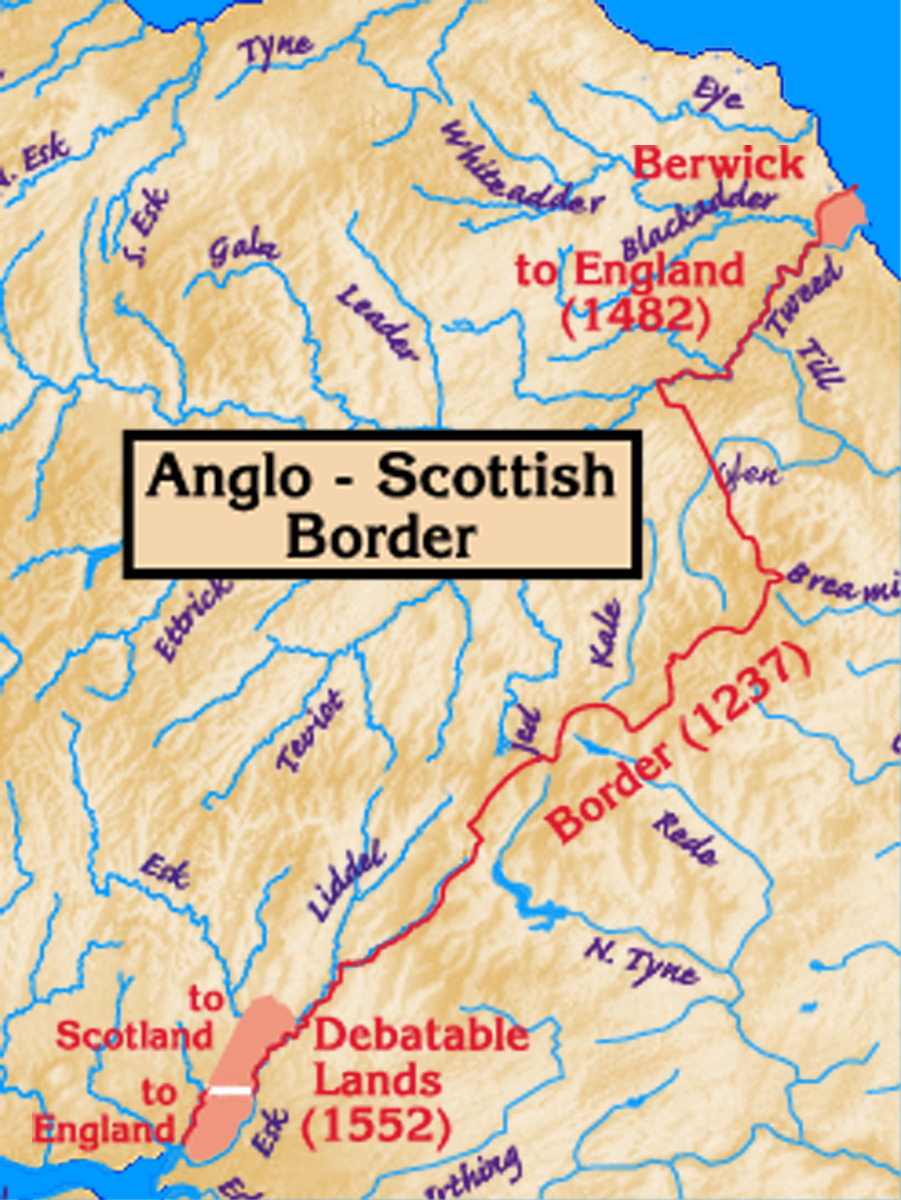
History of the border

The near-simultaneous collapse of the Brythonic Kingdom of Strathclyde and the disintegration of the Anglian Earldom of Bamburgh in the 11th century removed ancient realms that had long kept the regions distinct, enabling the southward expansion of Gaelic Alba and the spread of Norman rule in northern England. This expansion was driven by Norman, Breton, and Flemish forces encouraged by both Norman England and Alba, who dispossessed and colonised lands of Strathclyde, Galloway and Lothian to Northumbria, Cumberland (Cumbria), and Westmorland (Westmoringas). Previously, this broad region had been a complex mosaic of Brythonic, Anglian, Gaelic—including Norse and Norse-Gael communities and polities.

The border country, historically known as the Scottish Marches, is the area on either side of the Anglo-Scottish border including parts of the modern council areas of Dumfries and Galloway and the Scottish Borders, and parts of the English counties of Cumbria and Northumberland. It is a hilly area, with the Scottish Southern Uplands to the north, and the Cheviot Hills forming the border between the two countries to the south. From the Norman Conquest of England until the reign of James VI of Scotland, who in the course of his reign became James I of England while retaining the more northerly realm, border clashes were common and the monarchs of both countries relied on Scottish Earls of March and Lord Warden of the Marches to defend and control the frontier region.

=== Second War of Scottish Independence ===
Territory (in brown, hence including Edinburgh) claimed by England in the Treaty of Newcastle (1334).

In 1333, during the Second War of Scottish Independence, Scotland was defeated at the Battle of Halidon Hill and Edward III occupied much of the borderlands. Edward declared Edward Balliol the new King of Scots, in exchange for much of southern Scotland and absolute supplication, but this was not recognised by the majority of the Scottish nobility who remained loyal to David II and conflict continued. By 1341, Perth and Edinburgh had been retaken by the Scots and Edward Balliol fled to England, effectively nullifying the supposed treaty. Edward would continue the war but would be unable to restore the puppet ruler Balliol to the throne and with the Treaty of Berwick (1357) Scottish independence was once again acknowledged with any pretence to territorial annexations dropped.

=== Clans, Families, & Riding Surnames ===
A 16th-century Act of the Scottish Parliament talks about the chiefs of the border clans, and a late 17th-century statement by the Lord Advocate uses the terms "clan" and "family" interchangeably. Although Lowland aristocrats may have increasingly liked to refer to themselves as "families", the idea that the term "clan" should be used for Highland families alone is a 19th-century convention. This interchangeability, however, is conditional rather than automatic: Agnew and the Lord Lyon's own guidance both state that a clan or family is a legally recognised "noble incorporation" only once it has a chief recognised by the Lord Lyon. A name group without a recognised chief has no equivalent legal standing under either label.

Historic Border clans, family groups, and Graynes (riding surnames/families) include the following: Armstrong, Beattie, Bannatyne, Bell, Briar, Carruthers, Douglas, Elliot, Graham, Hedley of Redesdale, Henderson, Hall, Home or Hume, Irvine, Jardine, Johnstone, Kerr, Little, Moffat, Nesbitt, Ogilvy, Porteous, Robson, Routledge, Scott, Thomson, Turnbull of Bedrule, Tweedie.

=== Scottish Marches ===
Locality of the border as shown within the United Kingdom

During late medieval and early modern eras—from the late 13th century, with the creation by Edward I of England of the first Lord Warden of the Marches to the early 17th century and the creation of the Middle Shires, promulgated after the personal union of England and Scotland under James VI of Scotland (James I of England)—the area around the border was known as the Scottish Marches.

For centuries the Marches on either side of the boundary was an area of mixed allegiances, where families or clans switched which country or side they supported as suited their family interests at that time, and lawlessness abounded. Before the personal union of the two kingdoms under James, the border clans would switch allegiance between the Scottish and English crowns depending on what was most favourable for the members of the clan. For a time a powerful local clan dominated a region on the border between England and Scotland. It was known as the Debatable Lands and neither monarch's writ was heeded.

=== Middle Shires ===
Following the 1603 Union of the Crowns, King James VI & I decreed that the Borders should be renamed "the Middle Shires". In the same year the King placed George Home, 1st Earl of Dunbar in charge of the pacification of the borders. Courts were set up in the towns of the Middle Shires and known reivers were arrested. The more troublesome and lower classes were executed without trial; known as "Jeddart justice" (after the town of Jedburgh in Roxburghshire). Mass hanging soon became a common occurrence. In 1605 he established a joint commission of ten members, drawn equally from Scotland and England, to bring law and order to the region. This was aided by statutes in 1606 and 1609, first to repeal hostile laws on both sides of the border, and then to more easily prosecute cross-border raiders. Reivers could no longer escape justice by crossing from England to Scotland or vice versa. The rough-and-ready Border Laws were abolished and the folk of the middle shires found they had to obey the law of the land like all other subjects.

In 1607 James felt he could boast that "the Middle Shires" had "become the navel or umbilic of both kingdoms, planted and peopled with civility and riches". After ten years King James had succeeded; the Middle Shires had been brought under central law and order. By the early 1620s the Borders were so peaceful that the Crown was able to scale down its operations.

Despite these improvements, the Joint Commission continued its work, and as late as 25 September 1641 under King Charles I, Sir Richard Graham, a local laird and English MP, was petitioning the Parliament of Scotland "for regulating the disorders in the borders". Conditions along the border generally deteriorated during the Commonwealth and Protectorate periods, with the development of Moss-trooper raiders. Following the Restoration, ongoing border lawlessness was dealt with by reviving former legislation, renewed continually in eleven subsequent acts, for periods ranging from five to eleven years, up until the late 1750s.

== Controversial territories ==
=== The Debatable Lands ===
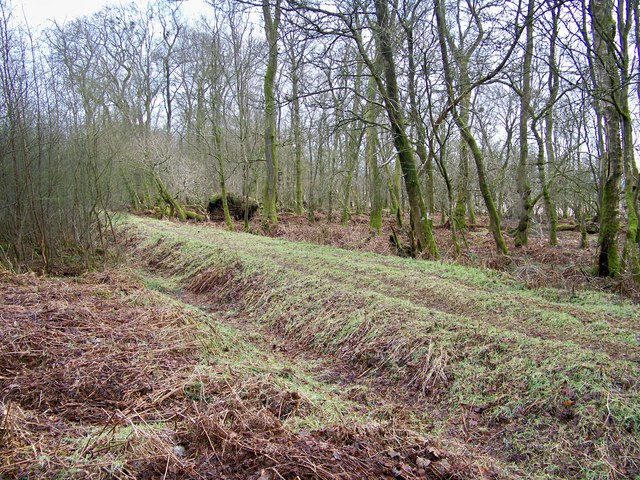
Scots' Dike

The Debatable Lands lay between Scotland and England to the north of Carlisle, the largest population centre being Canonbie. For over three hundred years the area was effectively controlled by local clans, such as the Armstrongs, who successfully resisted any attempt by the Scottish or English governments to impose their authority. In 1552 commissioners met to divide the land in two: Douglas of Drumlanrigg leading the Scots; Lord Wharton leading the English; the French ambassador acting as umpire. The Scots' Dike was built as the new frontier, with stones set up bearing the arms of England and of Scotland.

=== Berwick-upon-Tweed ===
Berwick is famous for its hesitation over whether it is part of Scotland or England. Berwickshire is in Scotland while the town is in England, although both Berwick and the lands up to the Firth of Forth belonged to the Kingdom of Northumbria in the Early Middle Ages. The town changed hands more than a dozen times before being finally taken by the English in 1482, though confusion continued for centuries. The Wales and Berwick Act 1746 clarified the status of Berwick as an English town. In the 1950s the artist Wendy Wood moved the border signs south to the middle of the River Tweed as a protest. In 2008 SNP MSP Christine Grahame made calls in the Scottish Parliament for Berwick to become part of Scotland again. Berwick's former MP Anne-Marie Trevelyan resisted any change, arguing that: "Voters in Berwick-upon-Tweed do not believe it is whether they are in England or Scotland that is important."

=== The Ba Green ===
At the River Tweed the border runs down the middle of the river, however between the villages of Wark and Cornhill the Scottish border comes south of the river to enclose a small riverside meadow of approximately 2 to 3 acres (about a hectare). This piece of land is known as the Ba Green (55°38′26″N 2°14′50″W). It is said locally that every year the men of Coldstream (to the North of the river) would play mob football with the men of Wark (to the South of the river) at Ba, and the winning side would claim the Ba Green for their country. As Coldstream grew to have a larger population than Wark, the Coldstream men always defeated the Wark men at the game, and so the land became a permanent part of Scotland.

== Hadrian's Wall misconception ==
Hadrian's Wall near Housesteads. The Wall has never formed the actual Anglo-Scottish border.

It is a common misconception that Hadrian's Wall marks the Anglo-Scottish border. The wall lies entirely within England and has never formed this boundary. While in the west, at Bowness-on-Solway, it is less than 0.6 mi (1.0 km) south of the border with Scotland, in the east it is as much as 68 miles (109 km) away.

For centuries the wall was the boundary between the Roman province of Britannia (to the south) and the Celtic lands of Caledonia (to the north). However Britannia occasionally extended as far north as the later Antonine Wall. Furthermore, to speak of England and Scotland at any time prior to the ninth century is anachronistic; such nations had no meaningful existence during the period of Roman rule.

"Hadrian's Wall" is nonetheless sometimes used as an informal reference to the modern border, often semi-humorously. (Note: Three examples of a humorous reference to Hadrian's Wall: "and there are plans for an electrified fence along Hadrian's Wall to prevent emigration from the rump republic" (Sandbrook 2012 quoting Robert Moss in The Collapse of Democracy (1975)); "a situation that the (notional) electrification of Hadrian's Wall is unlikely to change" (Ijeh 2014); A cartoon: "Hadrian's Wall Extension Plan" showing an extension of Hadrian's Wall around the coastline of England and Wales (Hughes 2014).)

== Migration ==
Cumbria and Northumberland have among the largest Scottish-born communities in the world outside Scotland. 16,628 Scottish-born people were residing in Cumbria in 2001 (3.41% of the county's population) and 11,435 Scottish-born people were residing in Northumberland (3.72% of the county's population); the overall percentage of Scottish-born people in England is 1.62%. Conversely, almost 9% of Scotland's population is English-born (459,486), with higher than average percentages of English-born people in both Dumfries & Galloway and the Scottish Borders council areas, respectively.

== List of places on the border, or associated with it ==
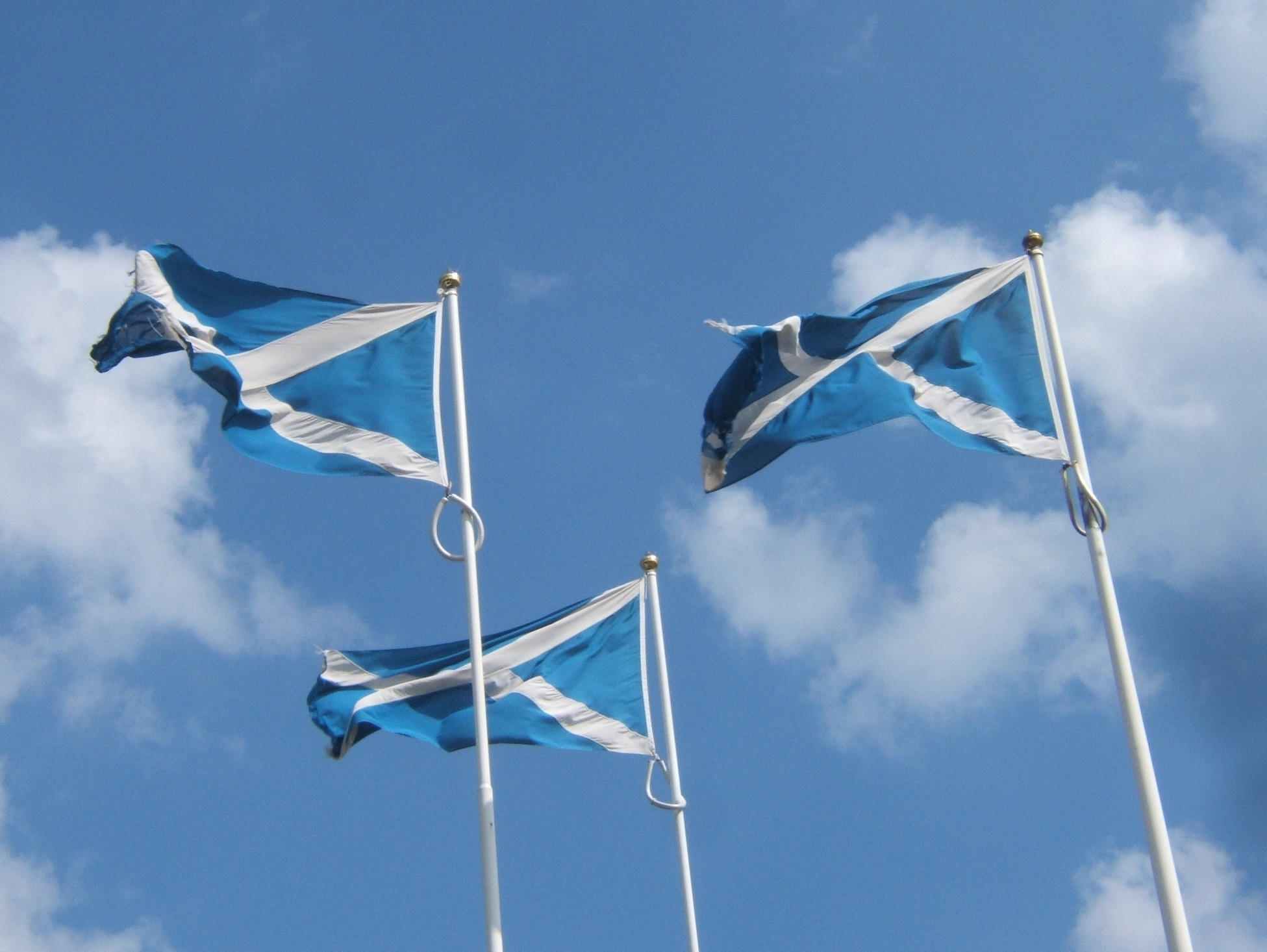
Three Scottish saltire flags fly at the border marking entry into Scotland

=== On the border ===
- Carter Bar
- Marshall Meadows Bay
- Pennine Way
- Scots' Dike
- Solway Firth
- St Cuthbert's Way
- Union Bridge (Tweed)

=== England ===
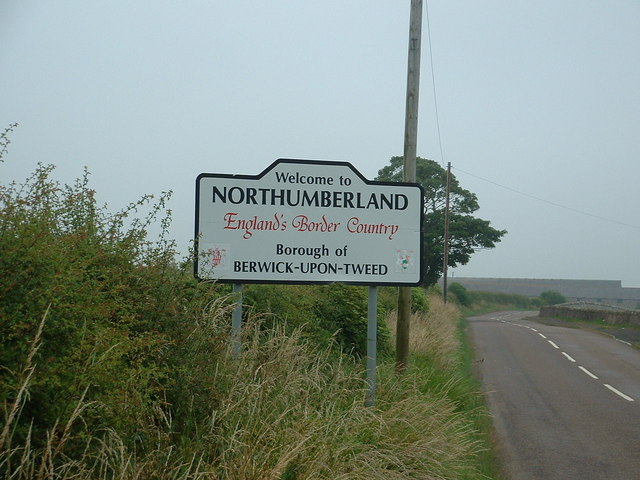
"Welcome to Northumberland"

==== Cumbria ====
- Arthuret
- Blackpool Gate
- Carlisle
- Hethersgill
- County of Cumberland
- Kershopefoot
- Longtown
- Skitby
- Stapleton

==== Northumberland ====
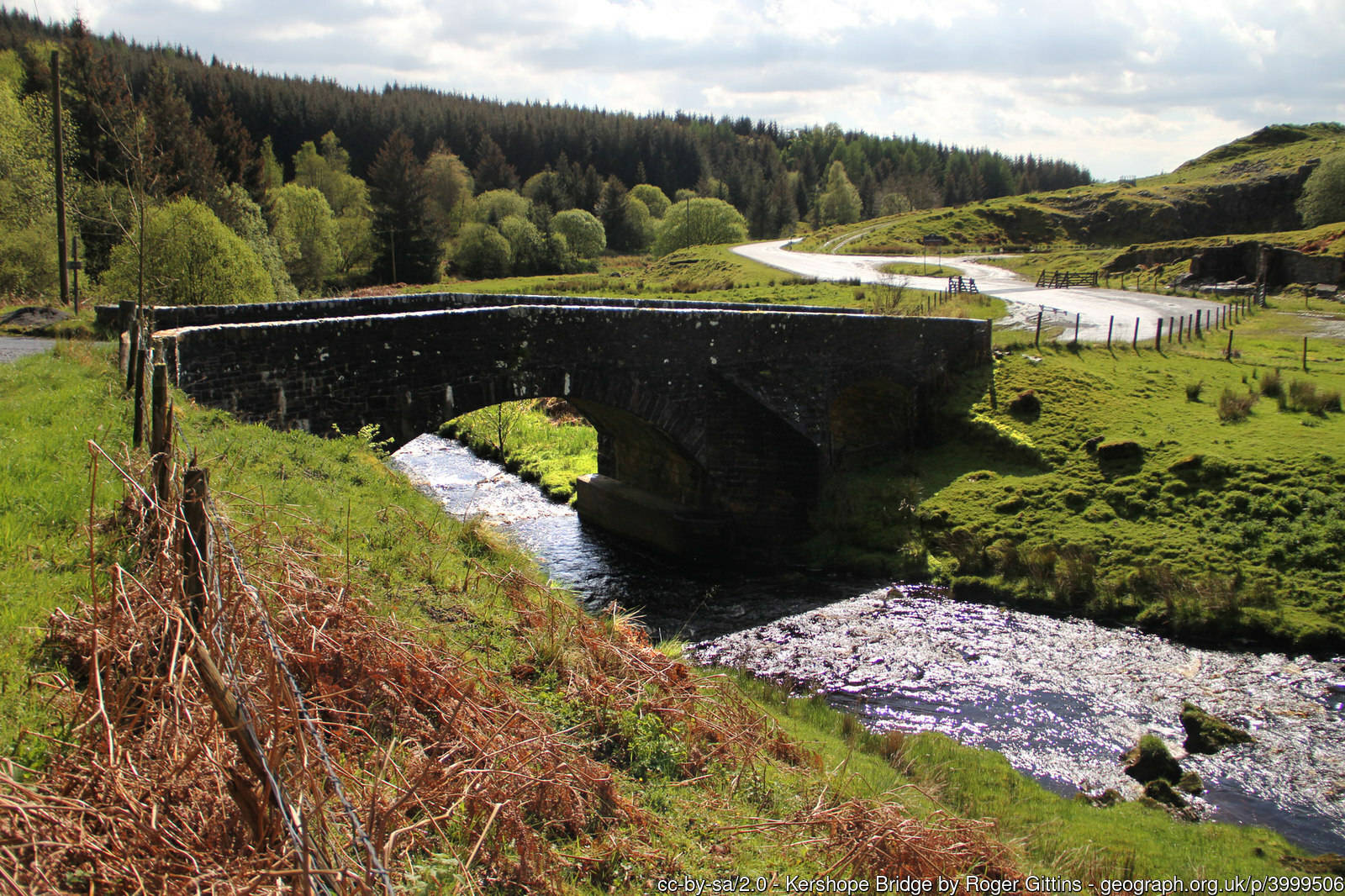
Kershope Bridge over Kershope Burn. Northumberland is to the left and the Scottish Borders to the right

- Ancroft
- Barmoor Castle
- Barrow Burn
- Beadnell
- Belford
- Berwick-upon-Tweed, and the former borough
- Bowsden
- Branxton
- Byrness
- Carham
- Catcleugh Reservoir
- Chatton
- Chillingham Castle
- Cornhill-on-Tweed
- Crookham
- Doddington
- Duddo and Duddo Tower
- Etal and Etal Castle
- Fowberry Tower
- Goswick
- Greystead
- Haggerston and Haggerston Castle
- Horncliffe
- Howtel
- Islandshire
- Kielder, Kielder Forest and Kielder Water
- Kilham
- Kirknewton
- Lilburn and Lilburn Tower
- Lindisfarne and Lindisfarne Castle
- Lowick
- Middleton
- Milfield
- Mindrum
- Norham and Norham Castle
- North Sunderland
- Otterburn
- Redesdale & River Rede
- Scremerston
- Spittal
- Twizell Castle
- Wark on Tweed
- Wooler
- Yeavering

=== Scotland ===
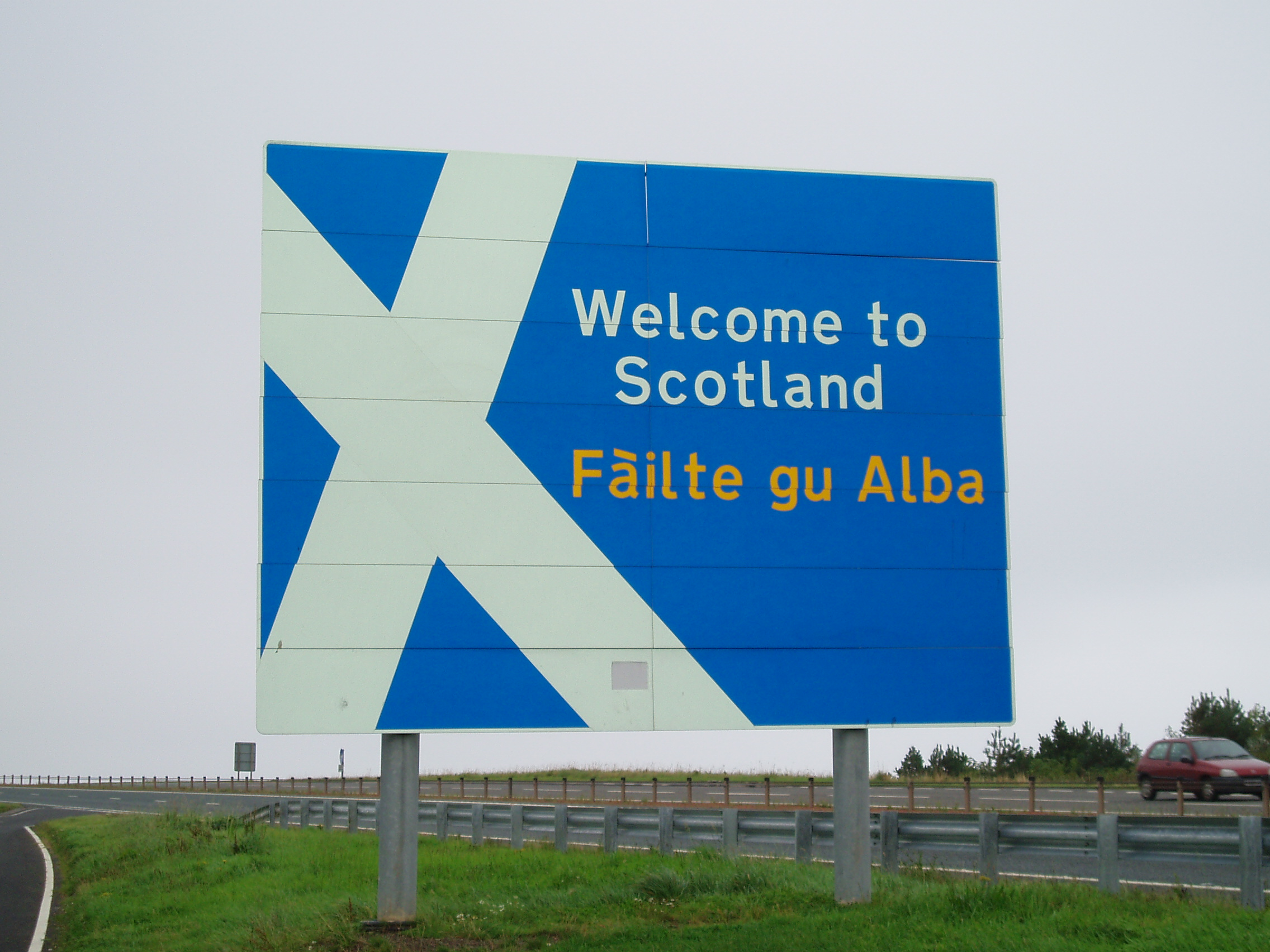
A sign marking entry to Scotland on the A7, on the border of Dumfries and Galloway

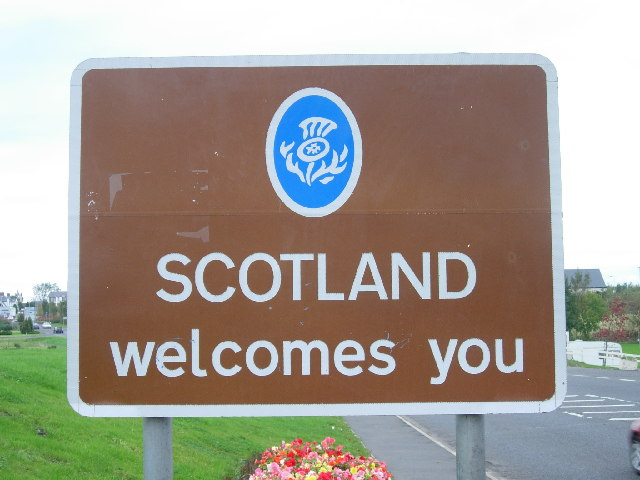
A sign marking entry to Scotland at Gretna, on the border of Dumfries and Galloway

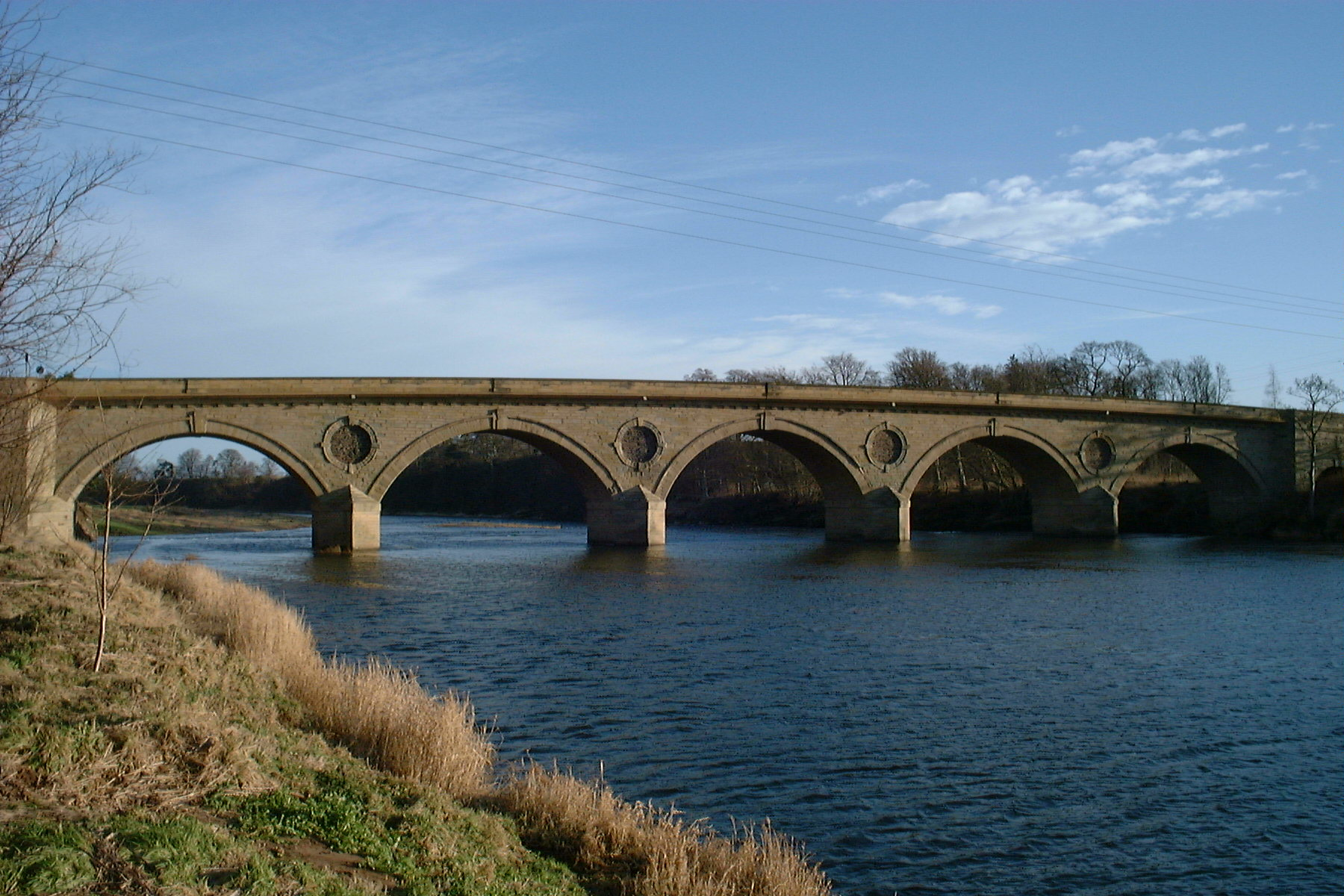
The bridge over the Tweed at Coldstream

==== Dumfries and Galloway ====
- Auchenrivock Tower
- Canonbie
- Gilnockie Tower
- Gretna
- Gretna Green
- Langholm
- Rowanburn

==== Borders ====
- Allanton
- Ayton
- Birgham
- Cessford Castle
- Chirnside
- Coldstream
- Dinlabyre
- Duns
- Eccles
- Eden Water
- Edgerston
- Ednam
- Edrington
- Edrom
- Ettrick
- Eyemouth
- Fogo
- Foulden
- Galashiels
- Hawick
- Hermitage and Hermitage Castle
- Hilly Linn
- Hilton
- Hume Castle
- Hutton
- Jedburgh
- Kelso
- Kirk Yetholm & Town Yetholm
- Ladykirk
- Lamberton
- Leitholm
- Liddesdale
- Mordington
- Morebattle
- Mowhaugh
- Newcastleton
- Oxnam
- Paxton
- Roxburgh and Roxburgh Castle
- Saughtree
- Selkirk
- Southdean
- Swinton
- Timpanheck
- Whitsome

=== Rivers ===
- Carham Burn
- River Esk
- River Rede
- River Sark
- River Teviot
- River Tweed
- Whiteadder Water
- Liddel Water
- Kershope Burn

=== Mountains ===
- The Cheviot
- Carter Bar & Carter Fell
- Windy Gyle

== See also ==
- Anglo
- Cheviot Hills
- Southern Uplands
- Border Reivers
- Border ballad
- Border pipes
- ITV Border
- Border Collie
- Border Terrier
- Both sides the Tweed
- Scottish Marches
- Star of Caledonia
- Scotch Corner
- Debatable Lands
- Wales-England border
- Welsh Marches
