= Kirkandrews on Esk =

Civil parish in Cumbria, England

Coordinates: 55.023498°N 2.9986368°W

Kirkandrews
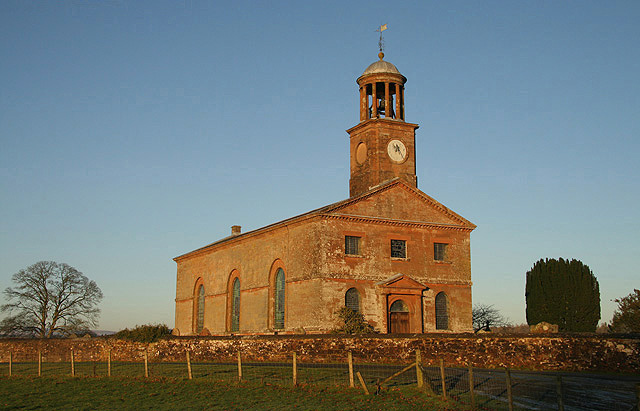
- The grade II* listed St Andrew's Church

- Location within Cumbria
- Area: 43.8536 km^{2} (16.9320 sq mi)
- Population: 458 (Parish, 2021)
  - Density: 10/km^{2} (26/sq mi)
- Civil parish: Kirkandrews
- Unitary authority: Cumberland
- Ceremonial county: Cumbria
- Region: North West
- Country: England
- Sovereign state: United Kingdom
- Post town: Carlisle
- Postcode district: CA6

Kirkandrews, also known as Kirkandrews on Esk to distinguish it from Kirkandrews-on-Eden, is a civil parish in the Cumberland district of Cumbria, England. The main settlement in the parish is the hamlet of Moat. The parish lies immediately south of the border with Scotland. In medieval times, Kirkandrews formed part of the Debatable Lands claimed by both England and Scotland. Following a treaty in 1552, the Debatable Lands were partitioned between the two countries, and Scots' Dike built to mark the agreed border; it remains part of the boundary of Kirkandrews parish today. The parish straddles the River Esk. At the 2021 census, it had a population of 458.

== Toponymy ==
Kirkandrews takes its name from its parish church (kirk), which is dedicated to St Andrew. A church has existed on the site since medieval times. The current church was built in 1776, replacing a building of 1635 which had in turn replaced the original medieval church.

== Geography ==
The parish is bordered to the west and north by Dumfries and Galloway, Scotland; to the north east by Nicholforest, and to the south by Arthuret. The area of the parish is 4,385 ha (16.93 sq mi; 43.85 km^{2}).

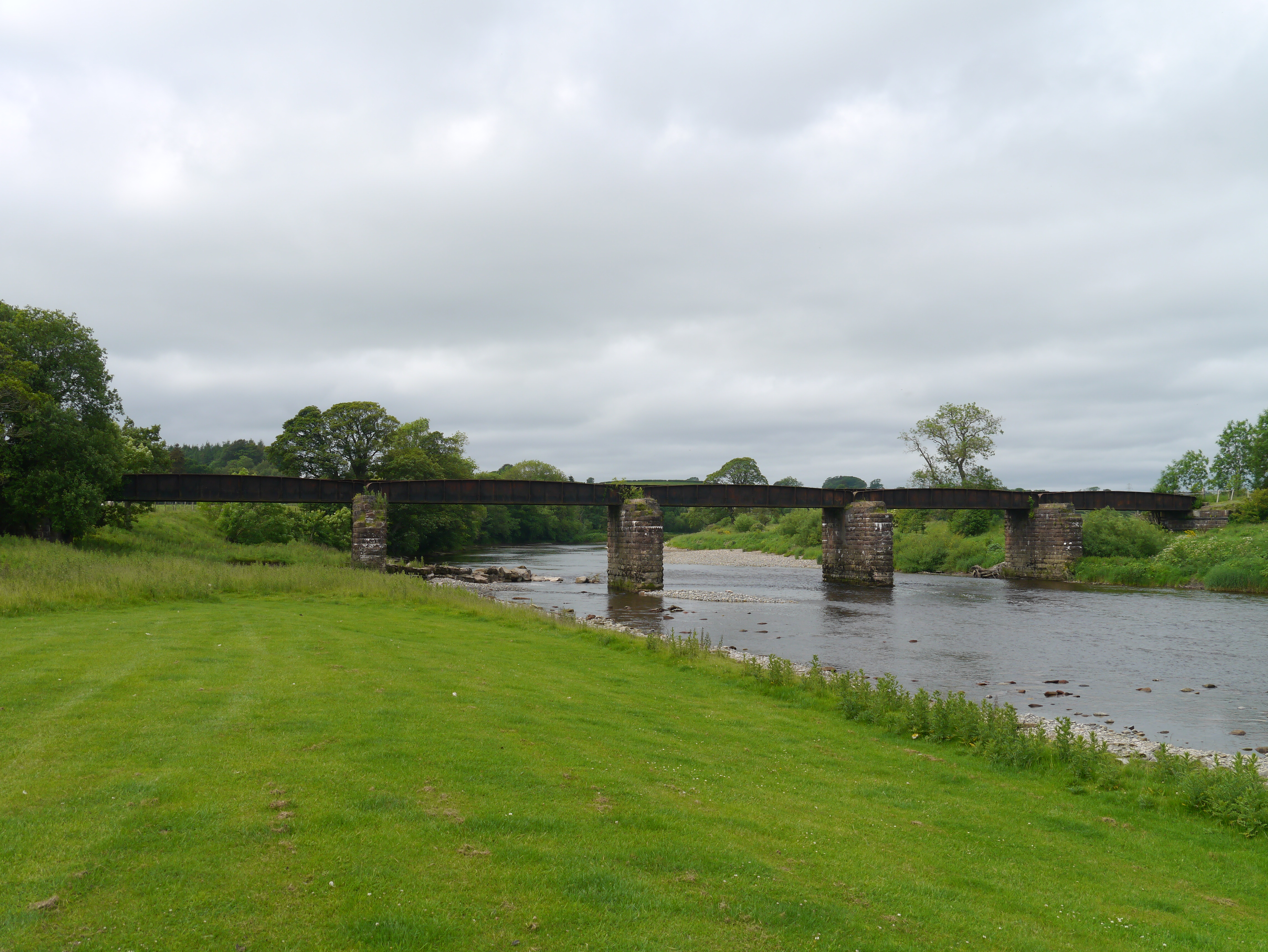
Thistle Viaduct over the River Esk

The parish straddles the River Esk; the only bridge over the river wholly in the parish is the disused Thistle Viaduct on the former Waverley Route railway. To travel between the parts of the parish either side of the river by road, it is necessary to leave the parish, the shortest route being via Longtown. The part of the parish east of the Esk is a rural area surrounding the hamlet of Moat.

The part of the parish west of the Esk is also rural, particularly in the north, and contains the peat bog of Solway Moss. There is no village called Kirkandrews; the parish church of St Andrew stands in a relatively isolated position on the west bank of the Esk, near Kirkandrews Tower, a peel tower (fortified manor house). The part of the parish west of the Esk also includes MOD Longtown, a Ministry of Defence munitions storage depot, which has been operating since 1938. At its western end, the parish is crossed by the M6 motorway and West Coast Main Line railway, and there are several bridges across the River Sark into Gretna in Scotland.

== History ==
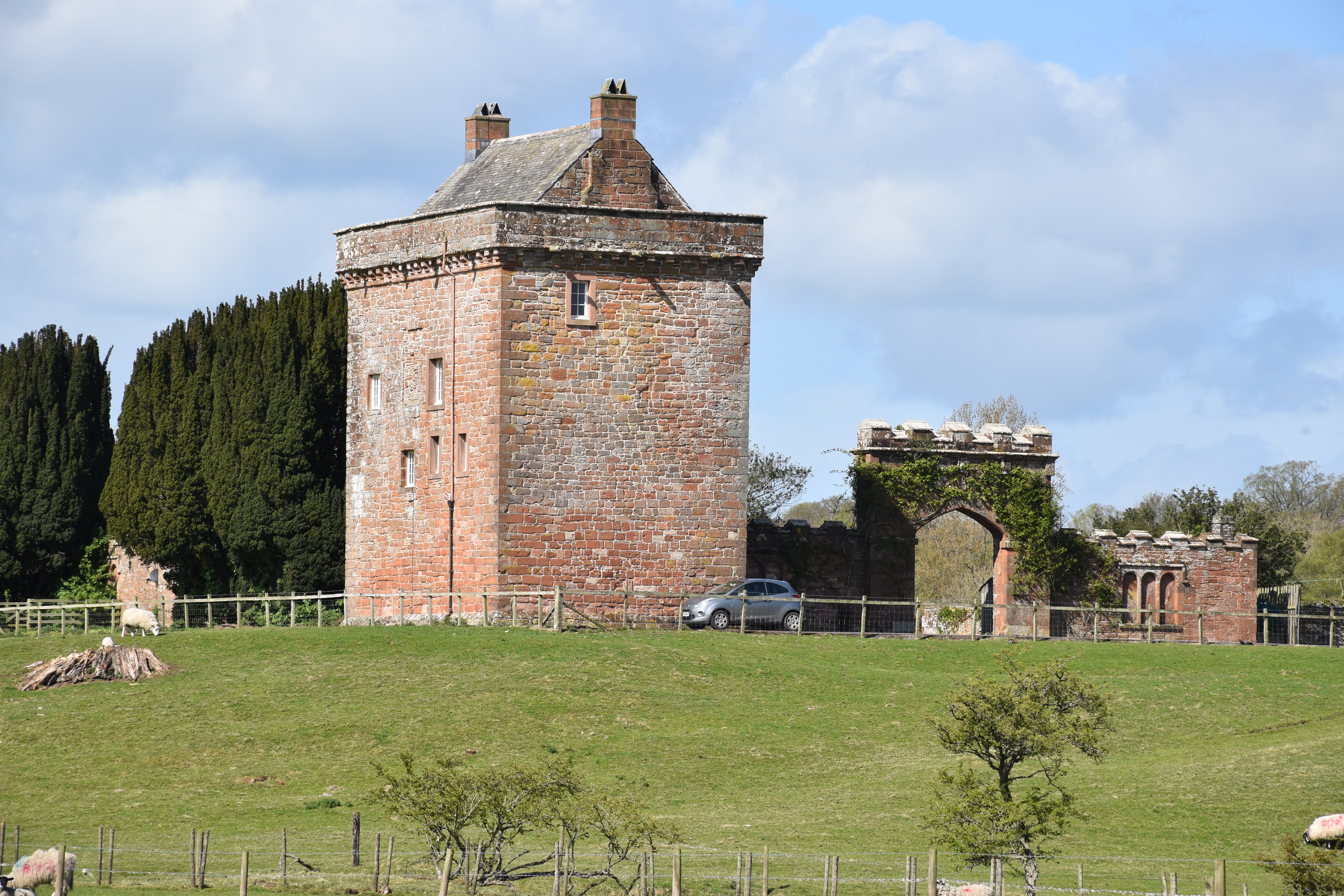
Kirkandrews Tower

Kirkandrews was historically controlled by the Graham family, who built Kirkandrews Tower. The family also built Netherby Hall on the opposite bank of the Esk, in the neighbouring parish of Arthuret. Kirkandrews Tower was rebuilt in the 16th century, after the previous building was destroyed in a battle in 1527 between the Grahams and their rivals, the Armstrongs of Hollows Tower near Canonbie.

Kirkandrews was claimed by both England and Scotland as part of the Debatable Lands, which also included the neighbouring barony of Canonbie to the north. In 1542, the Battle of Solway Moss between the two countries was fought in the parish of Kirkandrews. In 1552 the two countries reached agreement on a division of the Debatable Lands, which saw Scotland claim Canonbie and England claim Kirkandrews. The earthwork of Scots' Dike was then built to mark the agreed border.

The Border Union Railway was built through the parish as part of the Waverley Route from Carlisle to Edinburgh, opening in 1861.

== Listed buildings ==
As of 2017 there are 13 listed buildings in the parish, of which three are at grade II* and the others at grade II.

The church of St Andrew, which is grade II* listed, was built in 1776. It is described as "a plain Georgian rectangular structure on an unusual north south axis", and was remodelled by Temple Moore in 1893. The Friends of Kirkandrews upon Esk Church is a registered charity which supports the church.

== Governance ==
There are two tiers of local government covering Kirkandrews, at parish and unitary authority level: Kirkandrews on Esk Parish Council and Cumberland Council. The parish council generally meets at Moat Village Hall.

=== Administrative history ===
Kirkandrews upon Esk was an ancient parish. The part of the parish east of the Esk was in the historic county of Cumberland in England from the Treaty of York in 1237. The status of the part of the parish west of the Esk was not resolved until the 1552 agreement settling the Anglo-Scottish border through the Debatable Lands, after which the parish was wholly in Cumberland. The parish was subdivided into four townships: Kirkandrews Middle and Kirkandrews Nether west of the Esk, and Moat (or Kirkandrews Moat) and Nicholforest east of the Esk. The parish church was in the Kirkandrews Middle township. Nicholforest was also a chapelry, having its own chapel of ease.

From the 17th century onwards, parishes were gradually given various civil functions under the poor laws, in addition to their original ecclesiastical functions. In some cases, including Kirkandrews upon Esk, the civil functions were exercised by each township separately rather than the parish as a whole. In 1866, the legal definition of 'parish' was changed to be the areas used for administering the poor laws, and so the four townships also became civil parishes.

Three of the four townships from the ancient parish were reunited in 1934, when the civil parishes of Kirkandrews Middle, Kirkandrews Nether, and Moat were merged into a single parish. Whereas the ancient parish had been called "Kirkandrews upon Esk", the new parish created in 1934 was just called "Kirkandrews". Kirkandrews remains the official name of the parish, although the modern parish council calls itself Kirkandrews on Esk Parish Council.

== Demography ==
At the 2021 census the population was 458. The population had been 493 at the 2011 census.
