= Debatable Lands =

Region in Great Britain

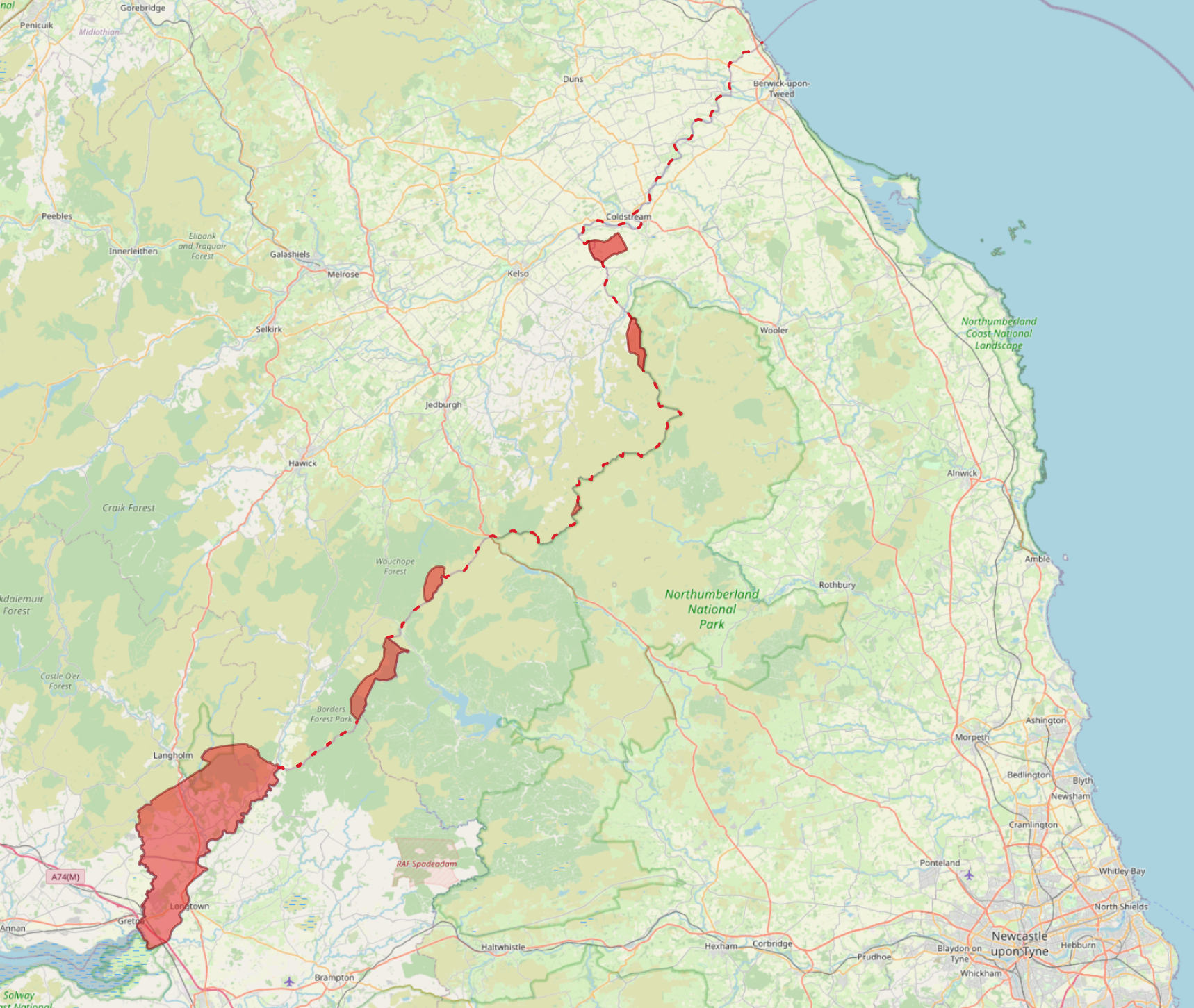
Anglo-Scottish Borderland: (De)batable Land and threiplands

The Debatable Lands, also known as debatable ground, batable ground or threip lands, lay between Scotland and England. It was formerly in question whether the lands belonged to either the Kingdom of Scotland or the Kingdom of England, when they were still distinct kingdoms. For most of its existence, the area was a lawless zone controlled by clans of "border reivers" which terrorised the surrounding areas. It became the last part of Great Britain to be brought under state control, when King James V of Scotland partially subdued the lands in the mid-sixteenth century. The territory was eventually divided between Scotland and England.

== Geography and etymology ==
The Debatable Lands extended from the Solway Firth near Carlisle to Langholm in Dumfries and Galloway, the largest population centre being Canonbie. The lands included the baronies of Kirkandrews, Bryntallone and Morton. They were around ten miles (16 km) long from north to south and four miles (6.4 km) wide. The boundaries were marked by the rivers Liddel and Esk in the east and the River Sark in the west.

The name either signifies litigious or disputable ground, or it comes from the Old English word "battable" (land suitable for fattening livestock).

== "Border reiver" clans ==
The origins of the peculiar status of this territory have been the subject of various interpretations. One of the more convincing proposals is that it arose from a landholding created on both sides of the Esk in the twelfth century. For over three hundred years the area was effectively controlled by local "riding surnames" or clans of border reivers, Scots for plunderers or raiders. They successfully resisted any attempt by the Scottish or English governments to impose their authority.

In his history of these clans (The Steel Bonnets, 1971), George MacDonald Fraser writes that the Armstrongs alone could put 3,000 men in the field. Other clans in the area were the Elwands, Ellwoods, or Eliotts who extended into Teviotdale; the Nixons who were more numerous in Cumberland; the Crossars in Upper Liddesdale; and the Grahams, who owned five towers in the Debatable Land. The Irvines, Carruthers, Olivers, Bells, Dicksons, and Littles were also present in varying numbers.

In the 15th century, both England and Scotland considered the Debatable Lands to be too poor and lawless to fight over or to attempt to govern. The prevailing anarchy in the area, however, spilled over into both countries as the reivers launched frequent raids on farms and settlements outside the Debatable Lands, and used the profits to become major landowners. This led to the parliaments of both kingdoms outlawing everyone in the Debatable Lands in 1537 and 1551 respectively, providing that "all Englishmen and Scottishmen are and shall be free to rob, burn, spoil, slay, murder and destroy, all and every such person and persons, their bodies, property, goods and livestock".

Eventually, however, the Debatable Lands became the last part of Great Britain to be brought under the control of a state beginning in 1530, when King James V of Scotland took action against the lawless clans of the Debatable Lands and imprisoned the lords Bothwell, Maxwell and Home, Walter Scott of Buccleuch, and other border lairds for their lack of action. James took various other steps, but significantly he broke the strength of the Armstrongs by hanging Johnnie Armstrong of Gilnockie and thirty-one others at Caerlanrig Chapel, under questionable circumstances.

== Division between England and Scotland ==
In 1552, commissioners from Scotland and England met and divided the Debatable Lands between England and Scotland, with a line, known as the Scots' Dike, drawn from Esk to Sark, abolishing the Debatable Lands' de facto independence from either crown. Regent Arran gave John Maxwell of Terregles £200 Scots in 1553 towards the building of "a dyke upun the Marches of this realm of the ground once called Debatable".

Since then, the Anglo-Scottish border has remained essentially unchanged. The 1552 division of the Debatable Lands, the Scots' Dike and the several changes to the status of Berwick-upon-Tweed between the thirteenth to fifteenth centuries until it finally became English in 1482, remains the only significant alterations to the border agreed in the 1237 Treaty of York.

The French diplomat Henri Cleutin described visits by the Regent Mary of Guise to the area in the 1550s. Cleutin wrote to Antoine de Noailles, the French ambassador in London, about the Graham Family who were at the centre of troubles. Richard Graham and his son William Graham, two English members of the family occupied Priory lands at Canonbie, and had expelled John Graham, the Scottish owner or tenant. Cleutin commanded a unit of cavalry during the Regent's progresses.

In 1590 James VI of Scotland declared that the Debatable Lands and the lands of Canonbie were annexed to the crown, and he set new leases to various landowners.

== See also ==
- Dumfriesshire
- History of Cumbria
- List of places in the Scottish Borders
- March law (Anglo-Scottish border)
- Scottish Marches
- No Man's Land
- Border dispute
