= Scots' Dike =

Cross dyke built as a Scotland-England border mark

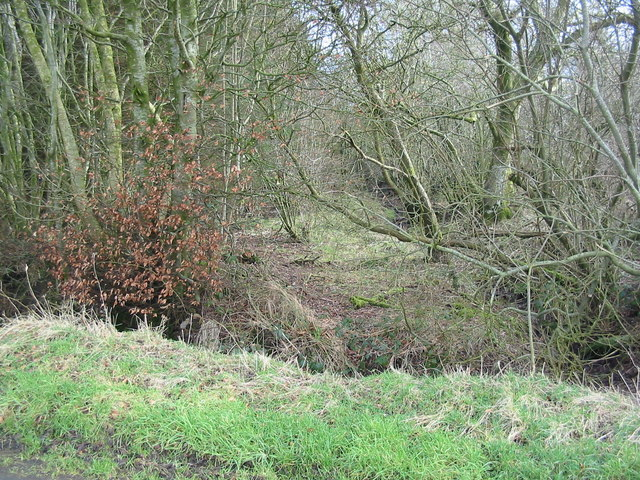
The Western terminus of the Scots' Dyke.

The Scots' Dike or dyke is a three and a half mile / 5.25 km long linear earthwork, constructed by the English and the Scots in 1552 to mark the division of the Debatable Lands and thereby settle the exact boundary between the Kingdom of Scotland and the Kingdom of England. The kingdoms were conjoined in 1707.

== Introduction ==
The Debatable Lands, also known as "Debatable ground", "Batable ground", or "Threpe" – a Scots term meaning "something that is argued over" – were in the West Marches, bounded on the west by the River Sark, to the east by the River Esk and Liddel Water, on the north by the Bruntshiell Moor and Tarras Moss, and on the south by the estuary of the Esk. The area was about ten miles from north to south and three and a half from east to west at its widest part. Canonbie was the main population centre within the debatable lands.

These lands were finally divided between the English and Scottish crowns by an agreement supposedly arbitrated by the French ambassador although his line was not the last and fynal Lyne of thr particion. The physical border constructed came to be known as the "Scots' Dike", the "March Dike" or more recently the "Scotsdike plantation", a political border rather than a fortification. The terminal points of the dike were said to be marked by square stones bearing the royal arms of England and Scotland; however, these markers have disappeared, were broken up for building nearby cottages or they never existed in the first place. Spaced along the centre of the bank are a number of small unmarked boundary stones of uncertain date, some of which have fallen.

It has been suggested that the name came from the archaic word "Batable" meaning land which was rich and fertile upon which stock animals were fattened or "battended". This is far from certain, however, and the word appears in 1449 in the expression 'The landez called batable landez or threpe landez in the west marchez', where batable and threpe seem to be near-synonyms, and as threpe means "argument, controversy, dispute" this is perhaps a more likely explanation of "Batable".

== Debatable Lands ==
=== Borderline ===
In 1222 a commission of six representatives from each kingdom attempted to fix the border line, and one proposed by the English commissioners more or less equates to that which is shown on Ordnance Survey maps today. The western Anglo-Scottish Border was more formally agreed in Edward II's reign with David II of Scotland in 1330, to run along the course of the Esk and Liddel from Gretna to Kershopefoot to delineate between the English and Scottish West Marches. In practice, however, this region was controlled by wardens of the marches who usually held the land in their own right and met at designated sites, such as the Lochmaben Stone to discuss and settle disputes.

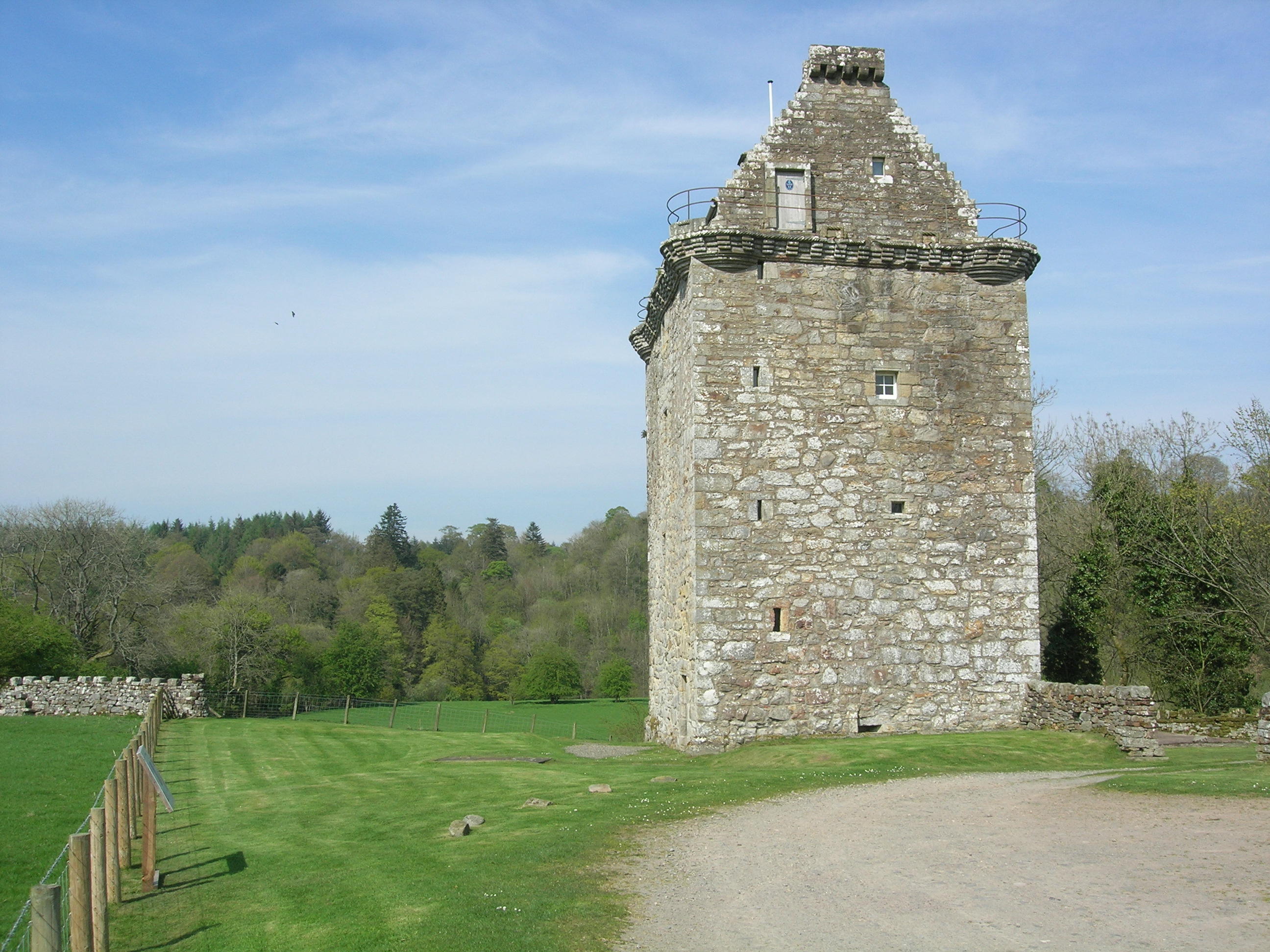
Gilnockie Tower, also known as Hollows, lies within the old Debatable Lands, near Canonbie in Dumfriesshire, Scotland. The Tower contains the Clan Armstrong Centre, open to the public.

The Debatable Lands with the Scots' Dike across the middle

In Scotland the Maxwells, Johnstons and Scotts secured the Scottish West March to Gretna and Langholm, and in England the region was controlled from Carlisle. The Esk basin at Arthuret was a marshy bogland which was difficult to police, with the Scottish jurisdiction having difficulty policing their side from Gretna to Canonbie. The Debatable Land arose because the Grahams, Armstrongs, Elliots and Bells were too powerful, and the Wardens largely left them alone. These four families raided equally in both England and Scotland, claiming allegiance to neither country; it actually suited both governments to have such a "buffer" zone, so the district became a sort of no-man’s land, where neither country could or would enforce their jurisdiction.

Eventually the general lawlessness spilled over and both wardens demanded that the Debatable Land be eradicated. So in 1552 the French ambassador was appointed to finalise the border line, together with Lord Wharton (of the Battle of Solway Moss fame) and Sir Thomas Chaloner nominated and appointed from England; Sir James Douglas of Drumlanrig and Richard Maitland of Lethington likewise nominated and appointed from Scotland. The commissioners agreed to a compromise demarcation line suggested by the French ambassador, and issued a final declaration that the borderline would run from the Sark to a point on Esk, opposite the house of Fergus Greme; a cross pattee at each end and styled 'this is the least and fynal lyne of the particion concluded xxiiij Septembris 1552.'

Ridpath in 1776 records that "...after some scruples and delays, commissioners appointed by each of the powers, met on the spot, and agreed on a line to be marked by a ditch and march stones."

== Division of the Debatable Lands ==
The Debatable Land was physically divided into two halves by a man-made ditch called the 'Scots' Dike', giving the western half (Grahams and Bells) to England under Edward VI and the eastern half (Armstrongs and Elliots) to Scotland under Queen Mary. England received the main western road into Scotland, while Scotland received little else but moorland; however, the Scots portion was the larger when the dike came to be built.

=== Construction ===
Regent Arran gave John Maxwell of Terregles £200 Scots in 1553 towards the building of "a dyke upun the Marches of this realm of the ground once called Debatable". The method adopted to dig the Scots' Dike was to dig two parallel ditches, and throw the material excavated therefrom into the intervening space, thus forming an earthen mound of varying height. There is no evidence of stone having been used. East of Crawsknow Farm, the Dike appears originally to have been about 12 feet broad and 3 or 4 feet high; however, it is variable e.g. at one point the Dike takes the form of a narrow strip and then becomes a double ditch with a space of about 30 ft separating them. There is little evidence that the dike has ever been used as a footpath. It may be that two teams built the dike, possibly one from each kingdom, with one starting from the west and another from the east. When the teams came close enough to each other they seem to have been about 21 feet out of their bearings and a correction in the line of the Dike became necessary. However, the more prosaic version is that marshy land was avoided, necessitating a curved approach.

Although not a fortification the fields nearby had double hedges planted with thorns and the ditches were wide enough to discourage crossings. The tracks between fields were designed to be "narrow and somewhat crooked so that the enemy or thief might be met at corners and annoyed by crossbow or other means."

=== Terminal stones ===
A Cross pattée

A Cross pattée arrondie

The various sources state that the terminal stones were square stones bearing the royal arms of England and Scotland. However, the Commissioners stated that they should bear "...a cross pattée at each end and styled 'this is the least and fynal lyne of the particion concluded xxiiij Septembris 1552.' " A cross pattée is a type of cross that has arms which are narrow at the centre, and broader at the perimeter. The name comes from the fact that the shape of each arm of the cross was thought to resemble a paw (French patte). There are several variants of the cross pattée, but it is not known whether these were ever actually made for installation at the dike's terminal points. What fate befell the stones that were made is not recorded. The 19th-century Ordnance Survey maps mark a number of boundary stones which are very unlikely to be contemporary with the terminal stones.

== Evidence from old maps ==
=== Name of the dike ===
Mercator's Scotiae Regnum of 1595 shows the Scots' Dike but does not name it. Robert Gordon's manuscript map of 1636-52 clearly marks the dike but does not name it or indicate any farms etc. associated with it. The Blaeu Atlas of Scotland by Joan Blaeu (1654) refers to the Dike as the "March (dyik) Dike" and indicates a dwelling named "March-dike (dyik)-foot". Herman Moll's (died 1732) map gives the name "March Dyck", but oddly he does not show the "March Dike" as being the borderline.

General Roy's Military Survey of Scotland, undertaken from 1747 to 1752, clearly marks the "Scots Dyke" by that name for the first time, shown as a set of parallel lines running from the Sark to the Esk.

The name "Scots' Dike" was in use by Roy's time, that is the mid 18th-century, but previously "March Dike" seems to have been favoured. It is not clear why the name "Scots" stuck, as the Scots might just as well have called it the "English Dyke": there has been an "Englishtown farm" marked since at least Roy's time.

=== Place-names associated with the dike ===
Etymology
A Roan in Scots is a tangle of brushwood or thorns and a 'Rig' is a section of a ploughed field. Roamyrigg seems a particularly accurate description of this site. '

The Blaeu Atlas of Scotland (1654) is the first to indicates a named dwelling, this being "March-dike (dyik)-foot". General Roy's Military Survey of Scotland undertaken from 1747 – 1752, indicates both "Craws Know", "English town" and "Scots Dyke"; however, March-dike-foot is not shown by that name.

William Crawford's map of 1804 shows a dwelling called Scots dyke and another called Crossdyke which is no longer marked as such by the 1920s. Thomas Moule's map of 1830 shows a 'Dykestown' which is also shown in Roy's map.

The 1901 OS marks a dwelling named 'Roamyrigg' at the Sark end of the dike, lying within part of what had been woodland with a boundary marker nearby (now fallen). This dwelling is not shown on the 1952 OS or at any later date.

== Scots Dike in the 20th century ==
=== Location ===
The dike runs from NY 3307 7367 to NY 3872 7319 (British national grid reference system) between the rivers Sark and Esk and forms the border between England and Scotland for that length.

=== Damage ===
It is clear from OS maps that since at least 1862 the majority of the length of the Scots' Dike has been afforested. Prior to the First World War (1914 – 1918) the section within the Scotsdike Plantation was largely intact, but tree felling operations, such as the laying down of temporary railway lines on top of the dike and the hauling of cut tree trunks, caused considerable damage or even complete destruction in places. The period between 1916 and 1926 seems to have been the worst, despite complaints having been lodged regarding the wholesale destruction of a national monument.

=== Visual remains ===
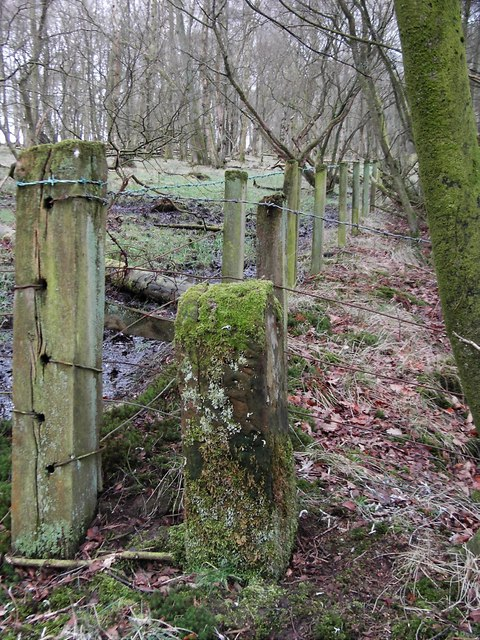
A Scots' Dyke boundary stone.

The dike is only traceable within the Scots Dike Plantation, consisting of a bank, with slight ditches on either side, which varies in width from 5.8 m at the west end to 3.3 m at the east end, standing to a maximum height of 0.8 m. The east and west ends cannot be traced, and in places the ditches have silted up while elsewhere they have been re-cut.

In June 1999 English Heritage field investigators visited as part of a National survey pilot project. They describe the monument as lying at the centre of a belt of woodland, comprising spruce plantation to the north of the dike and deciduous woodland to its south. Parts of the plantation had been felled recently, but the dense vegetation rendered detailed survey impossible and investigation was limited to surface examination of the dike. The remains of the linear earthwork, between NY 3346 7396 and NY 3850 7325, consisted mainly of flat-topped bank flanked by a ditch on either side. The form and preservation of these features varied considerably along the length of the dike and it was concluded that little of the monument survived in its original form, but its course is preserved in later boundaries and drainage ditches.

Etymology
A Craw in Scots is a rook, carrion or hooded crow. A 'Knowe' is a knoll or low hill. Crawknowe is therefore the 'Hill of the Crow.'

Long sections of the ditches, especially the northern ditch, have been re-cut to provide drainage for the conifer plantation, although in places the modern drainage appears to have been cut through the centre of the dike. Elsewhere, for example at NY 3490 7385, the feature have been almost plough-levelled, the ditches having disappeared and the bank surviving as little more than a rise in the ground. Between NY 3544 7375 and NY 3570 7370, where the Glenzier Beck crosses the course of the dike, there are no traces of the earthwork; whether it has simply not survived or whether the dyke was ever constructed across the slack was not apparent. At a number of points along the length of the dike - most notably at approximately NY 3445 7390 and NY 3635 7355 – there is a disjointure in the earthwork which is suggestive of a shift in the line of the original boundary, perhaps due to later land use. At the extreme western end of the dike, between approximately NY 3346 7396 and NY 3390 7392, a second, much slighter bank and ditch lies to the south of the main earthwork but may be nothing more than later drainage. The course of the dike between the western end of Scotsdike Plantation and the River Sark could not be traced on the ground but it was thought that it followed the extant field boundary to the south of Craw's Knowe farm.

=== Access ===
The site is marked as an ancient monument on some tourist maps and 'Solway Heritage' unveiled a new access point to the dike in 1999. No interpretation or formal access to the dike itself exists at present (2006). The easiest point of informal access is via the minor road at the Sark end of the dike.

Access from the eastern end is from a large lay-by on the A7. A path runs round the back of a house (at 387733) and up the bank to the rear. On entering the wood there is a bridge across a ditch with a modern marker post showing the location of the boundary.

=== Status ===
The Scot's Dike is recorded in the English National Archaeological Record as ancient monument NY37SE 14, and in Scotland it is likewise recorded by the RCAHMS as NMRS number: NY37SE 6. It is a scheduled monument under the terms of the Ancient Monuments and Archaeological Areas Act 1979; from the crest north the monument is scheduled in Scotland; from the crest south, in England.

== Scotch Dike railway station ==
A railway station named Scotch Dyke was opened on 25 October 1861 by the Border Union Railway as 'Scotsdyke' and later renamed 'Scotch Dyke'. It was on the English side of the present border, and closed on 2 May 1949. It was a two-platform station with a level crossing to its north. Today (2006) the former station retains its building and platforms. The canopy of the building has a script reading "Speed and comfort by rail" with its 'British Railways' logo."

== Other national border earthworks ==
The Countrup Sike at NT 8495 2912 is a much reduced bank, 0.2 m high and 2 m wide, running for less than 20 m, virtually along the line of the border in a north-west direction. Its true nature remains to be confirmed as this will require more than just field observation.

== Scot's Dyke at Richmond ==
A Scot's Dyke also exists at Richmond, North Yorkshire, where it runs up to the river Swale. It is of most likely late Iron Age in date.

== Miscellany ==
The term 'lands Debatable' was still being used as late as 1604 by the Supreme Courts of Justice in Scotland.

In Scotland a dyke or dike is a stone wall, but in England a dyke is a ditch. In the Cumbrian dialect of English a Dike is the name given to a banked hedgerow.

The Battle of Solway Moss took place in the Debatable land near Gretna on 24 November 1542. It was described as a rout in which the Scots lost and shortly after James V died, although he had not been present at the battle in person.

== See also ==
- Anglo-Scottish border
- Offa's Dyke and Wat's Dyke separating the English kingdom of Mercia and the Welsh kingdom of Powys
- Hadrian's Wall
- Antonine Wall
- Berwick-upon-Tweed
- Silesia Walls
