= Clan Armstrong =

Border Scottish clan

- Clann Mac Ghillielàidir
- Crest: An arm from the shoulder, armed, Proper
- Motto: Invictus maneo (I remain unvanquished)

Profile
- Region: Scottish Borders
- District: Liddesdale
- Clan Armstrong no longer has a chief, and is an armigerous clan
- Historic seat: Mangerton
- Last Chief: Archibald Armstrong of Mangerton
- Died: 1610
Allied clans
Clan Elliot
Clan Moffat
Clan Crozier
Clan Nixon

Clan Armstrong is a Scottish clan of the Scottish Borders.

== History ==
=== Origins of the clan ===
==== Traditional origins ====
According to the legend and tradition, the first of the name Armstrong was Siward Beorn (sword warrior), who was also known as Siward Digry (sword strong arm). He was said to be the last Anglo-Danish Earl of Northumberland and a nephew of King Canute, the Danish king of England who reigned until 1035.

==== Recorded origins ====
The Armstrong name was common over the whole of Northumbria and the Scottish Borders. The Armstrongs became a powerful and warlike clan in Liddesdale and the Debatable Lands. Historian George Fraser Black lists Adam Armstrong in 1235 as being pardoned for causing the death of another man. By tradition, the Armstrongs followed the cause of Robert the Bruce in the Scottish Wars of Independence, and their recorded relationship with the crown was certainly more straightforwardly loyal in the fourteenth century than in later periods. Alexander Armstrong, second laird of Mangerton was imprisoned and killed by the anti-Bruce conspirator William de Soulis at Hermitage Castle. Gilbert Armstrong, served as steward of the household of David II of Scotland, Master of the Horse to the king, and ambassador to England in 1363. Sir Adam Armstrong was listed in 1374 as one of the knights permitted to travel outside Scotland with the Earl of March and Dunbar, then the principal defender of the Scottish border. Fourteen years later, John Armstrong fought in the army of James, second Earl Douglas at the Battle of Otterburn in 1388. In 1398, Alexander, David and Geoffrey Armstrong committed their signatures as 'borowis' for the third Earl of Douglas in pledging to keep the peace on the border.

=== 15th, 16th and 17th centuries ===
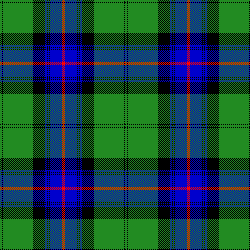
Armstrong tartan

In around 1425 John Armstrong, brother of Armstrong of Mangerton in Liddesdale built a strong tower. The Armstrongs were able to raise three thousand horsemen and were said to be at one point in control of the debatable lands. In 1528, Lord Dacre, who was the English Warden of the Marches, attacked the Armstrongs' tower but the Armstrongs retaliated and burned Netherby. The power of the Armstrongs was seen by James V of Scotland as a threat to his own authority. According to tradition, James tricked Johnnie Armstrong of Gilnockie to a meeting at Hawick where the king hanged the Armstrong laird. King James continued his treatment of the Armstrongs when they failed to support him in 1542 at the Battle of Solway Moss and the Sixteenth Century saw their reputation for lawlessness grow in tandem with their refusal to acknowledge either the Scottish or English crown. Yet the Armstrongs' depredations never matched the violence of disputes among clans led by Crown officers, such as the Johnstones and Maxwells (successive Wardens of the West March), whose Battle of Dryfe Sands resulted in hundreds of casualties and deaths.

Owing to their notoriety and possibly the animus of James VI, the Armstrongs could sometimes serve as a political signifier, as with James' diminutive jester Archie Armstrong (in mockery of his namesake, the family's last laird) and Shakespeare's Fortinbras in Hamlet (as a coded figure of foreign threat). The Union of the Crowns in 1603 ended the clan's independence as well as the Anglo-Scottish Wars of the Borders. Finally, in 1610, clan leader Archibald Armstrong was hanged in Edinburgh in reprisal for a raid on Penrith, England followed by a brutal campaign by the Crown to pacify the Borders. As a result, families were scattered with many of them seeking new homes in Ulster, particularly in County Fermanagh. Armstrong is now amongst the fifty most common names in Ulster. There has been no trace of the various Armstrong chiefs since the clan was dispersed in the 17th century. Despite their tense relationship with the Stewart crown, a number of Armstrongs are recorded as officers in the royalist armies serving Charles I in the Wars of the Three Kingdoms. "Robert Armstrong, Gent, one of His Maties Servants," was buried at St. Olave, York," among a number of royalist casualties. The professional soldier Sir Thomas Armstrong settled in Ireland in 1639, was elected to the Dublin parliament and fought for the crown in the armies of the Earl of Ormonde and the Earl of Inchiquin. He and his sons Thomas and William engaged actively in royalist conspiracies against the Cromwellian Protectorate through the following decade. William ("Christie's Will") Armstrong, perhaps the last of the clan's famous border freebooters, also fought for the crown as a servant of the earl of Traquair.

=== Modern clan history ===
Amongst the many distinguished Armstrongs are Sir Alexander Armstrong who was an Arctic explorer, and Neil Armstrong who was the first man to walk upon the Moon, taking with him a piece of the Clan Armstrong tartan. The Armstrong Baronets are descendants of Gilnockie. Comedian Alexander Armstrong is a descendant. Edwin Howard Armstrong, the inventor of FM radio, is also a descendant. Although there has been no trace of the Armstrong chiefs since the clan was dispersed in the 17th century, there is a powerful and active clan association and the Clan Armstrong Trust was established in 1978.

== Castles ==
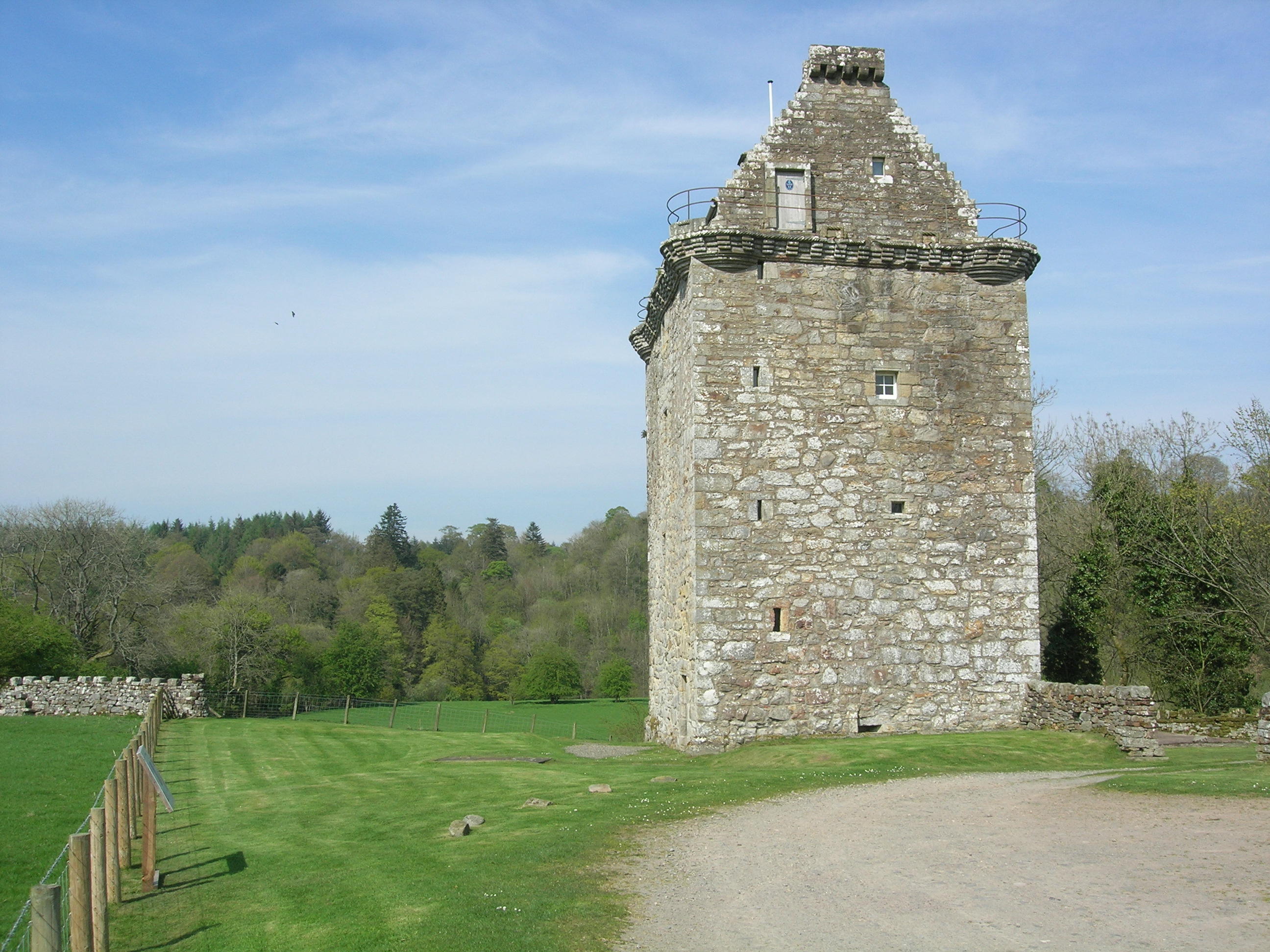
Gilnockie Tower, a Clan Armstrong tower

Castles owned by the Clan Armstrong have included amongst many others:

- Gilnockie Tower, also known as Hollows Tower, a couple of miles north of Canonbie in Dumfriesshire. It was apparently built in 1518 but there was probably an earlier stronghold on the site. It now houses a Clan Armstrong Centre.
- Mangerton Tower, one mile south of Newcastleton, which is near to the English border. Nearby is the Minholm Cross, which was erected in about 1320 to commemorate the murder of Alexander Armstrong in Hermitage Castle.

== Gaelic ==
It is unknown if any of the early Armstrongs spoke Gaelic, but Gaelic-derived place names such as Auchenrivock can be found in the Esk River valley, and the language persisted in Galloway, Carrick and the Western Borders well into the seventeenth century, so it is possible. The name of the Armstrong stronghold itself, Gilnockie, is from the Scottish Gaelic Geal Cnocan meaning 'Little White Hill'.

The Armstrong name is sometimes rendered in Gaelic as follows:

- MacGhillielàidir (Surname)
- Clann 'icGhillelàidir (Collective)

These Gaelic names appear frequently in modern clan literature, but they are neologistic and are rarely used by Gaelic speakers. However, Armstrong has been historically associated with the Ulster Gaelic name, Mac Tréan-Labhraidh, a branch of the Ó Labhradha family. Tréan-Labhradh means strong-speaking but it is thought that the name was misunderstood as meaning strong-arm, and Armstrong was adopted as a convenient Anglicization. Mac Tréan-Labhraidh would translate as Mac Treun-Labhraidh in Scottish Gaelic. Other common associated names include variations on Traynor, Treanor, Trainor, McCreanor, MacCrainor; which all derive from the Irish Gaelic name, Mac Threinfhir, meaning son of the strong man. After the Plantation of Ulster many Armstrongs (mainly those who were Catholic) adopted the Traynor surname.

Among the best-known Gaelic-speaking Armstrongs was Dr Robert Armstrong of Perthshire, who compiled an authoritative early Gaelic-English dictionary, published in 1825.

== See also ==
- Johnnie Armstrong
- Kinmont Willie Armstrong
- Border Reivers
- Bromley Armstrong
