= Mangerton =

Mangerton may refer to:

- Mangerton, Dorset, a hamlet in England
- Mangerton, New South Wales, a western suburb of the coastal city of Wollongong, New South Wales, Australia
- Mangerton Mountain, and the Mangerton Mountain range, in Kerry, Ireland
- Mangerton Tower, ruined Scottish castle of the Armstrong family
