= Glenzier =

Coordinates: 55.068089°N 3.008985°W

Glenzier (/ˈɡlɪŋər/; see yogh for the unintuitive spelling) is a rural area in Dumfries and Galloway, Scotland.

== See also ==
- Scots dike and the Glenzier burn.
