= Canonbie Priory =

Priory in Dumfries and Galloway, Scotland

The Canonbie Priory was a community of Augustinian canons based at Canonbie in Dumfriesshire, Scotland. It was founded from Jedburgh Abbey after a grant by a minor landlord, Turgis de Rosdale, confirmed by of King William somewhere between 1165 and 1170. The house was small and is badly recorded. It was turned into a secular lordship in 1606, as part of Jedburgh Abbey, for Alexander, Lord Home.

== See also ==
- Prior of Canonbie
