= Prior of Canonbie =

The Prior of Canonbie was the head of the Augustinian monastic community of Canonbie Priory, in Dumfries and Galloway. The priors are badly documented and few are known. The following is a list of priors who are known:

- William, 1296
- John de Jedburgh
- [?] Graham, fl. 1494
- [?] Graham, fl. 1532
- John Graham, fl. 1540
- George Graham, fl. 1540
- James Oliver, fl. 1576

== Bibliography ==
- Watt, D.E.R. & Shead, N.F. (eds.), The Heads of Religious Houses in Scotland from the 12th to the 16th Centuries, The Scottish Records Society, New Series, Volume 24, (Edinburgh, 2001), pp. 28–9

== See also ==
- Canonbie Priory
