= Canonbie =

Village in Dumfries and Galloway, Scotland

Coordinates: 55.078°N 2.952°W

Canonbie: Scottish Gaelic: Canonbaidh
- Location within Dumfries and Galloway
- Population: 390 (2001 Census)
- OS grid reference: NY393764
- Council area: Dumfries and Galloway
- Lieutenancy area: Dumfries
- Country: Scotland
- Sovereign state: United Kingdom
- Post town: CANONBIE
- Postcode district: DG14
- Dialling code: 013873
- Police: Scotland
- Fire: Scottish
- Ambulance: Scottish
- UK Parliament: Dumfriesshire, Clydesdale and Tweeddale
- Scottish Parliament: Dumfriesshire

Canonbie (Scottish Gaelic: Canonbaidh) is a small village in Dumfriesshire within the local authority area of Dumfries and Galloway in Scotland, 6 miles (10 kilometres) south of Langholm and 2 miles (3 kilometres) north of the Anglo-Scottish border. It is on the A7 road from Carlisle to Edinburgh, and the River Esk flows through it. There are frequent references in older documents to it as Canobie.

== History ==
Canonbie was the main population centre within the Debatable Lands, bounded on the west by the River Sark, to the east by the River Esk and Liddel Water, on the north by the Bruntshiell Moor and Tarras Moss, and on the south by the estuary of the Esk. The main families holding land and exerting influence in the area were the Graemes, Armstrongs, Elliots and Bells.

Canonbie Parish had an Austin priory at Hallgreen, dating back to about 1165. The priory was destroyed during the reign of Henry VIII after the Battle of Solway Moss in 1542. A grassy mound in a field near the present day church is believed to be the only remnant of the ruins. Remains of a Roman station crown a rising ground near the old Gilnockie station; and ruins of famous mediaeval strongholds are at Hollows and Harelaw; remains of other mediaeval strengths are at Mumbyhirst, Auchenrivock, Hallgreen, Woodhouselees, and Sark.

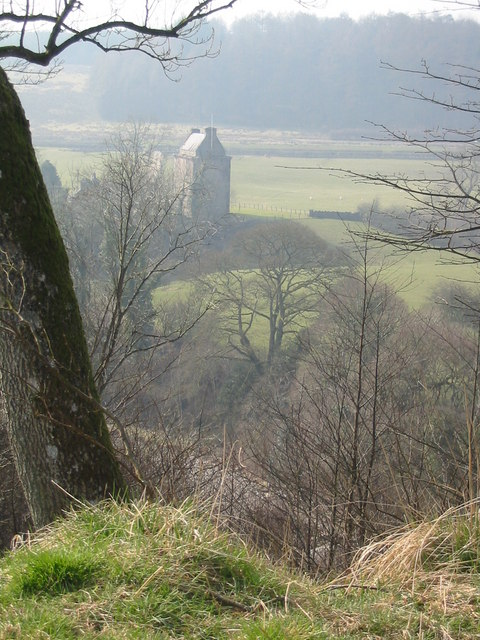
Gilnockie Tower, also known as Hollows Tower

Gilnockie Castle lies immediately left of the north side of Canonbie Bridge, occupying a strong defensive site and was once the seat of the Armstrongs, Lairds of Mangerton. It was the home of John Armstrong of Gilnockie and was unfinished at the time of his death. Not much of the castle remains. When James V became king of Scotland, one of his objectives was to restore order in his kingdom and to pacify the borders. He commanded an army of 12,000 men. He ordered all earls, lords, barons, freeholders and gentlemen to meet at Edinburgh with a month's supplies, and then to proceed to Teviotdale and Annandale. The nobles were to bring their dogs with them. After hunting for a few days, the King offered safe conduct to Armstrong for an audience. Armstrong was the laird of Kilnockie and was felt by all Scots to be as good a chieftain as there was within the borders, either in Scotland or England. He and his men were hanged in the trees of Carlanrig churchyard. There is a legend that persists to this day that the Dule trees (gallows) upon which they were hanged withered and died and that the same has happened to any trees which were planted since. He is said to have shouted to the King. "I have asked grace at a graceless face." His execution weakened James' authority in the borders and was a grave mistake on the King's part.

Canonbie was immortalised in a poem by Sir Walter Scott entitled Marmion. A famous section covers the exploits of young Lochinvar. Having stolen the hand of the bride of Netherby Hall, about 3 miles (5 kilometres) south of Canonbie, the dashing knight is chased through Canonbie, but makes good his escape.

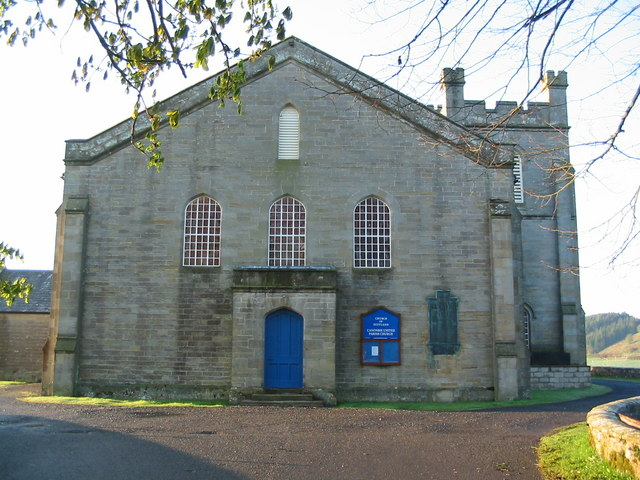
Canonbie Church

Canonbie was deeply affected by the 2001-foot and mouth crisis, with all the surrounding farms losing their herds. It is only 5 miles (8 kilometres) north of Longtown, where the disease was first spotted at the livestock market.

== Facilities ==
The village contains a post office/convenience store, a public hall and recreation ground, a primary school, a church, a clock shop, a hairdresser and the Cross Keys Hotel. Canonbie crosses the River Esk, and Gilnockie Tower is a short walk away.

Canonbie is on two public bus routes, the X95 (Borders Buses) and 127 (Telford's).

Canonbie hosts a local football team called Canonbie Bowholm FC, in existence since 1925.

== Natural history ==
Knopper galls were first noted in Scotland at Canonbie in 1995; their distribution is often restricted to old country and urban estates where the Turkey oak has been previously planted.

== Notable residents ==
- Pathologist James Lorrain Smith and his sister, lichenologist Annie Lorrain Smith
- Rev. Alexander Watson Milne (1819–1885), minister of the Free Church (1848–85)
- Catherine Eliza Richardson, poet

== See also ==
- List of places in Dumfries and Galloway
