= Caerlanrig =

Coordinates: 55.33356°N 2.94894°W

Caerlanrig: Scottish Gaelic: Cathair Lannraig
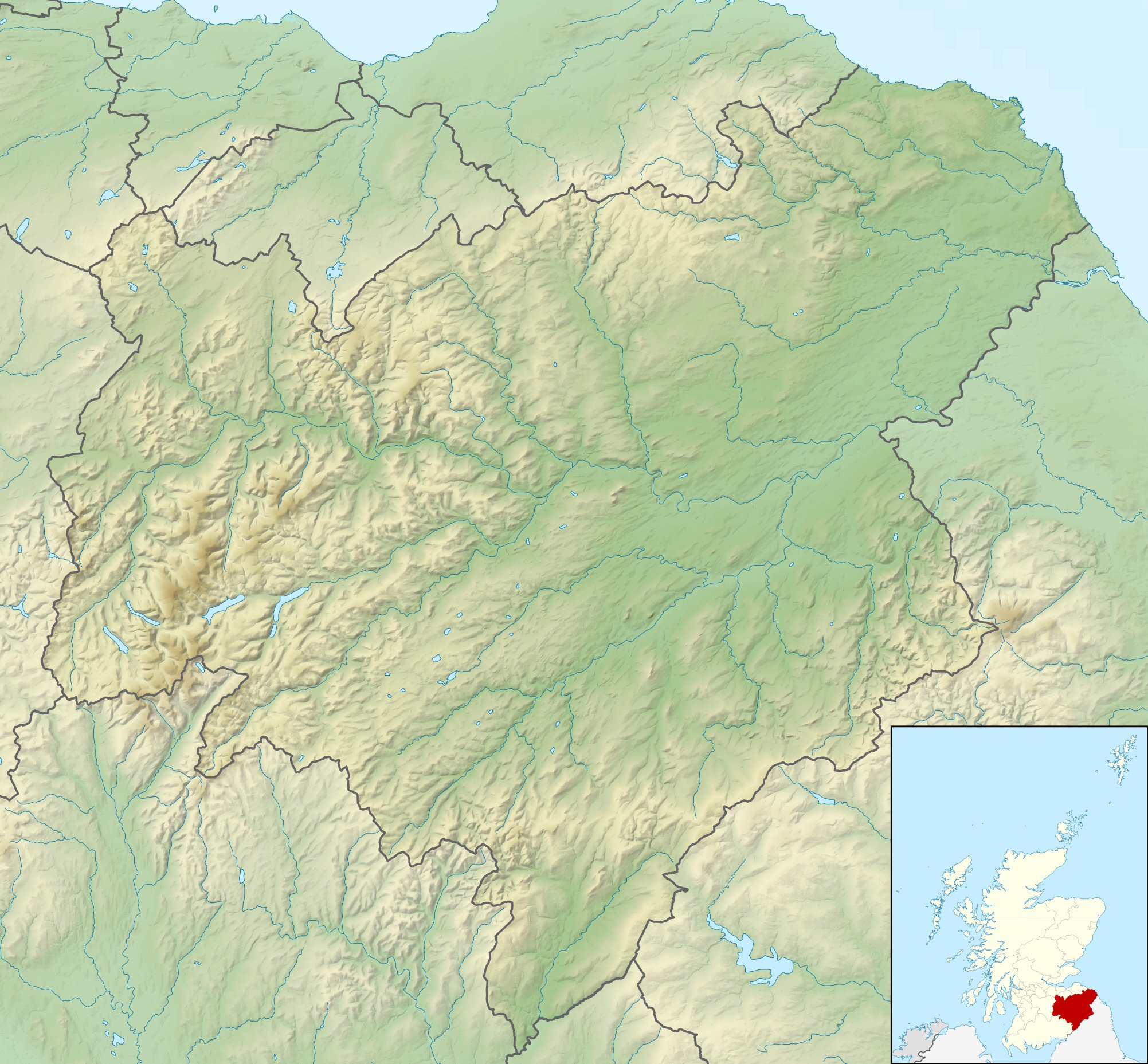
- Location within the Scottish Borders
- Community council: Upper Teviotdale and Borthwick Water
- Council area: Scottish Borders
- Lieutenancy area: Roxburgh, Ettrick and Lauderdale
- Country: Scotland
- Sovereign state: United Kingdom
- Post town: HAWICK
- Postcode district: TD9
- Dialling code: 01450
- Police: Scotland
- Fire: Scottish
- Ambulance: Scottish
- UK Parliament: Berwickshire, Roxburgh and Selkirk
- Scottish Parliament: Ettrick, Roxburgh and Berwickshire

Caerlanrig - also spelled 'Carlenrig' - (Gaelic: Cathair Lannraig) is a hamlet in the parish of Teviothead, Borders, Scotland, lying on the River Teviot, 6 miles (10 km) north east of that river's source, and 10 miles (16 km) south west of Hawick.

== Etymology ==
The first element of the name is probably the extinct Cumbric cair 'fortification', though Gaelic cathair has been suggested. The second element is generally taken as Cumbric lanerx, meaning 'clearing' (cf. Welsh llanerch). Another suggestion is that the name is Cumbric cair + Old English lang 'long' and hrycg 'ridge'.

== Border reiver ==
It is best known for being the site where John Armstrong of Gilnockie, notorious member of Clan Armstrong and brother of Thomas, Laird of Mangerton was captured and hanged by King James V for being a reiver. The king's household book records that James V was at Caerlanrig on Tuesday 5 July 1530.

== See also ==
- List of places in the Scottish Borders
- List of places in Scotland
