= Duddo Tower =

Ancient Monument and Grade II listed building in Northumberland, England

- Northumberland, England
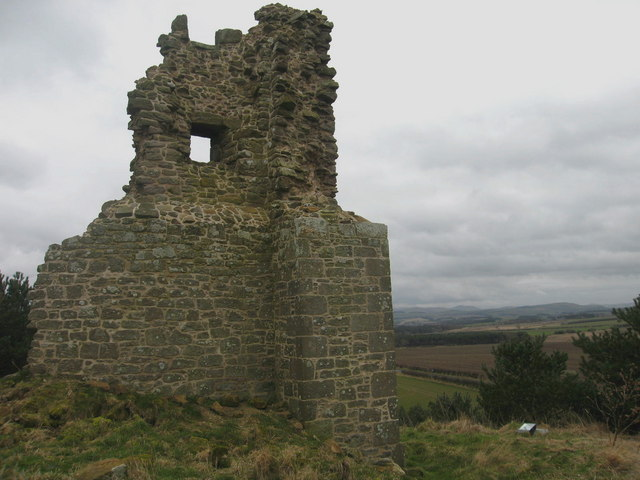
- Duddo Tower, 2006

Location
- Location in Northumberland
- Coordinates: 55.676°N 2.101°W
- Grid reference: NT937425

Duddo Tower is a Scheduled Ancient Monument and a Grade II listed building comprising the ruinous remains of an ancient pele tower and 16th century tower house, situated on a prominence on the south side of the village of Duddo, Northumberland, England.

The Tower was part of the ancient manor of Duddo, of some 1,600 acres (650 ha), owned by the Stryvelling family. The pele tower was destroyed by the Scots in 1496. The estate was later acquired by the Clavering family who rebuilt a tower house on the site in the late 16th century. The house was usually occupied by a junior branch of the family until it was abandoned as a home in the 17th century.

The estate was sold in 1788 by John Clavering of Callaly Castle to Sir Francis Blake and sold on by the Blakes (for £45000) in 1823 to Thomas Fryer.
