= Barrow Burn =

Hamlet in Upper Coquetdale in the county of Northumberland, England

Coordinates: 55.388°N 2.214°W

Barrowburn
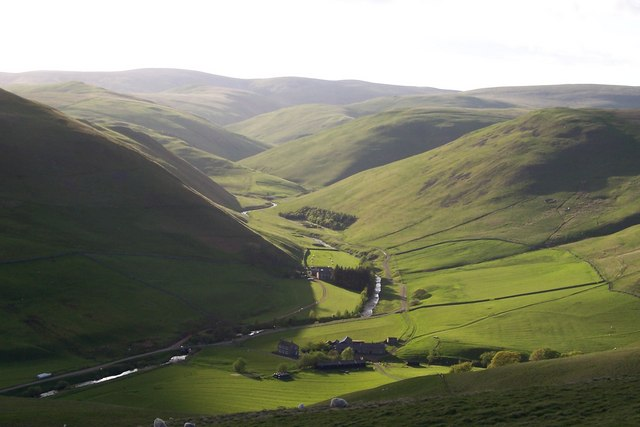
- Barrowburn and Windyhaugh

- Location within Northumberland
- OS grid reference: NT865105
- District: Northumberland
- Shire county: Northumberland
- Region: North East
- Country: England
- Sovereign state: United Kingdom
- Post town: MORPETH
- Postcode district: NE65
- Police: Northumbria
- Fire: Northumberland
- Ambulance: North East
- UK Parliament: Berwick-upon-Tweed

Barrowburn is a hamlet in Upper Coquetdale in the county of Northumberland, England. It comprises a working farm with associated buildings and two holiday lets. One of the holiday lets is the Old School House, which closed as a school in the 1970s. The settlement is situated by the River Coquet, at its confluence with Barrow Burn (stream), after which the settlement is named. There is a road bridge over the Coquet and a ford over the burn here.

== History ==
Barrowburn is thought to be the site of a deserted medieval village and there was a medieval fulling mill at Windyhaugh, a short distance upstream on the River Coquet. Historically, the settlement and surrounding area formed the township of Barrow, which was part of the ancient parish of Alwinton. Barrow became a civil parish in its own right in 1866. The old village hall at Barrowburn was used for markets and dances for farmers from the valley, and also for mass sheep clipping. Windyhaugh School was built in 1879 and was in use as a school until 1978 (in 1993 it was converted to become Barrowburn camping barn). In 1955, Barrow Civil Parish was abolished and the area became part of Alwinton Civil Parish.

== Governance ==
Barrowburn is in the parliamentary constituency of Berwick-upon-Tweed.
