= Johnnie Armstrong =

Scottish villain and a ballad about him

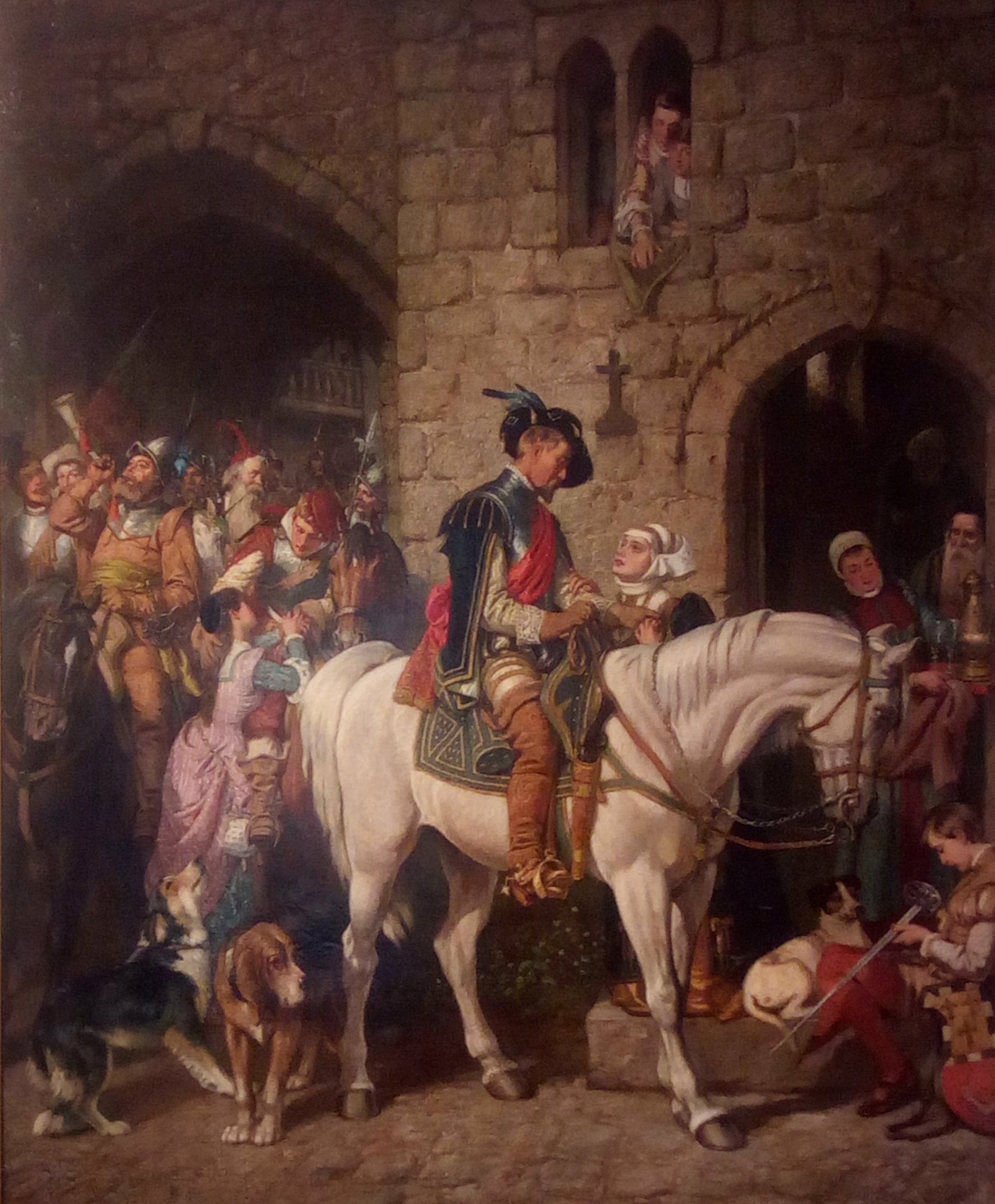
Johnnie Armstrong depicted in a 19th-century painting at the Laing Art Gallery in Newcastle upon Tyne.

Johnnie Armstrong or Johnie Armstrong was a Scottish raider and folk-hero. Johnnie Armstrong of Gilnockie was captured and hanged by King James V in July 1530. He is related to the Baird family. Child ballad number 169 tells of his life.

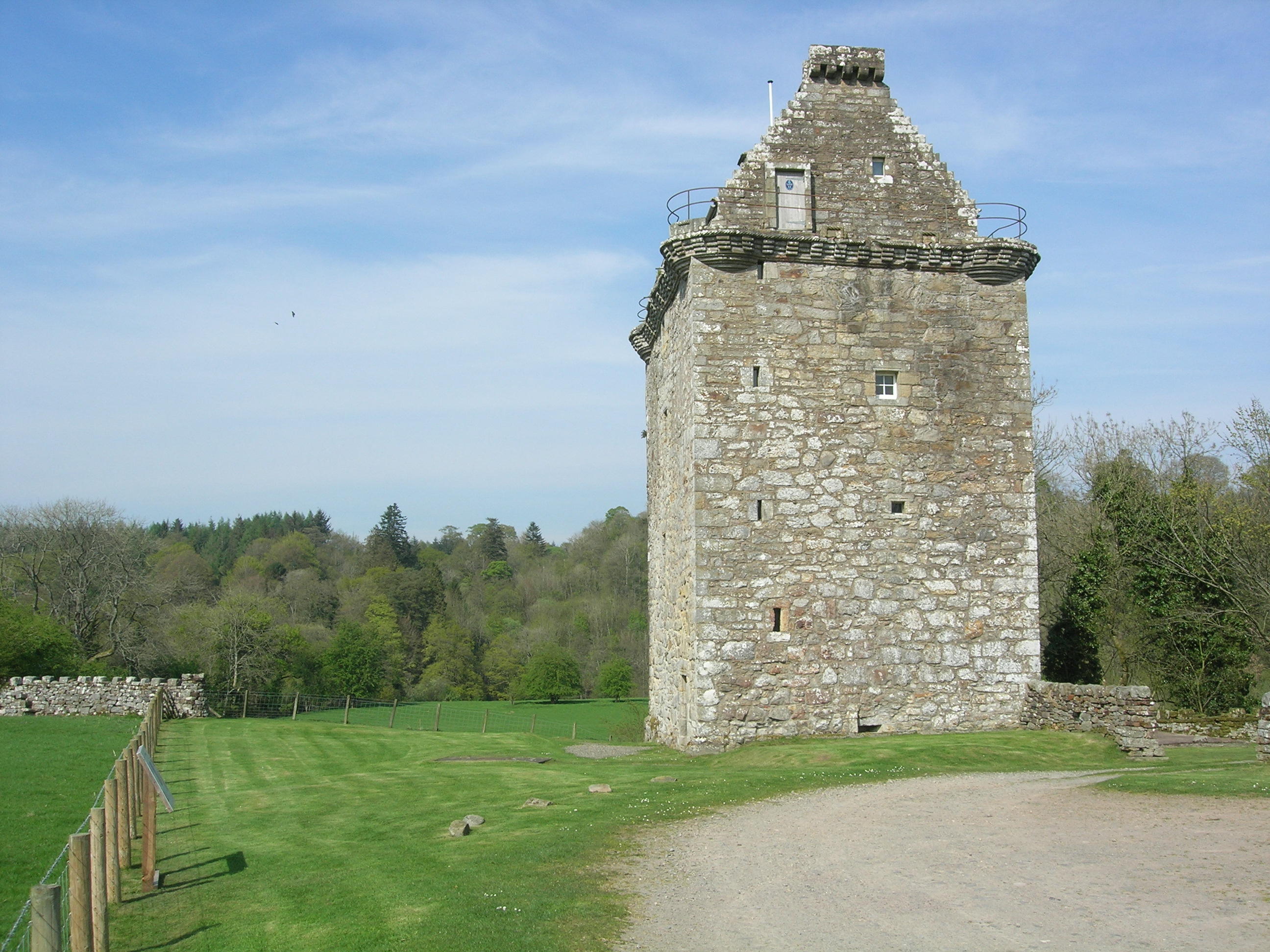
Gilnockie Tower, in Dumfries and Galloway.

== History ==
John Armstrong of Langholm and Staplegorton, called Johnnie of Gilnockie, was a famous Scottish Border reiver of the powerful Armstrong family. A plunderer and raider, he operated along the lawless Anglo-Scottish Border in the early 16th century, before England and Scotland were joined by the Union of the Crowns. Like his fellow reivers, he raided into England when Scotland was in the ascendancy, and would change allegiances as power shifted. He led a band of a hundred and sixty men, despite having no income from rents.

The romanticised picture of Armstrong was promoted by the nineteenth-century writings of Sir Walter Scott and Herbert Maxwell. Armstrong operated with impunity for some years under the protection of Robert Maxwell, 5th Lord Maxwell, as a leader of a gang of raiders. He burnt Netherby in Cumberland in 1527, in return for which William Dacre, 3rd Baron Dacre burnt him out at Canonbie in 1528; and Gavin Dunbar, the Archbishop of Glasgow as well as Chancellor of Scotland, intervened with an excommunication for Armstrong, whose activities made the central authority look weak and were a hindrance to diplomacy with England. When King James V took personal control of the situation, Armstrong and his men were dealt with severely, as rebels. In July 1530, Armstrong was captured. The king had promised him safe conduct, but he was hanged with 36 of his men at Caerlanrig chapel. A memorial to Armstrong and his men stands in the chapel graveyard.

== The King's hunting trip in July 1530 ==
The king's movements in July 1530 were recorded in his household book. The account lists food purchases and dates with the king's location. He left Linlithgow Palace on 2 July to ride to Peebles. Next, his entourage rode to Douglas Water, and James was at Caerlangrig on Tuesday 5 July. After his encounter with Johnnie Armstrong, James returned to Peebles, and spent a few days hunting at Cramalt Tower. On 20 July he returned to Linlithgow.

== An interlude at Linlithgow Palace ==
In 1540 Johnnie Armstrong was mentioned in a play or interlude performed at Linlithgow Palace before James V. The play is thought to have been an early version of A Satire of the Three Estates by David Lindsay. An actor looked at a king depicted in the play, and declared this "was not the Kinge of Scotlande, for ther was another King in Scotlande that hanged John Armestrang with his fellowes, and Sym the Lairde, and many other more, which had pacified the countrey, and stanched thefte."

== The ballad ==
The Ballad of Johnnie Armstrong, one of many Border ballads dealing with the reivers, relates that the king sends him a letter, requesting his presence at court and promising him safety. Johnnie is fooled by this honour and orders his men to dress richly, as befits the court. On their arrival, Johnnie asks for a pardon, but instead the king tries to arrest them, and Armstrong orders them to fight. They are all killed, although Johnnie is brought down only by a treacherous attack from behind. As is common in many such Scottish ballads, his son, still "on his nurse's knee", vows revenge.

The variants sometimes open with a lament that it is not safe to appear before the king, or end with a thanksgiving that, as a reiver, Johnnie Armstrong had kept the English out of Scotland.

"The Ballad of Johnny Armstrong" has been recorded by David Wilkie and Cowboy Celtic, and by Gunning and Cormier. A version also appears in the 2016 album 'Dodgy Bastards' by English folk rock band Steeleye Span.

Armstrong's story was dramatised by John Arden in his play Armstrong's Last Goodnight.
