= Duddo =

Village in Northumberland, England

Coordinates: 55.677°N 2.102°W

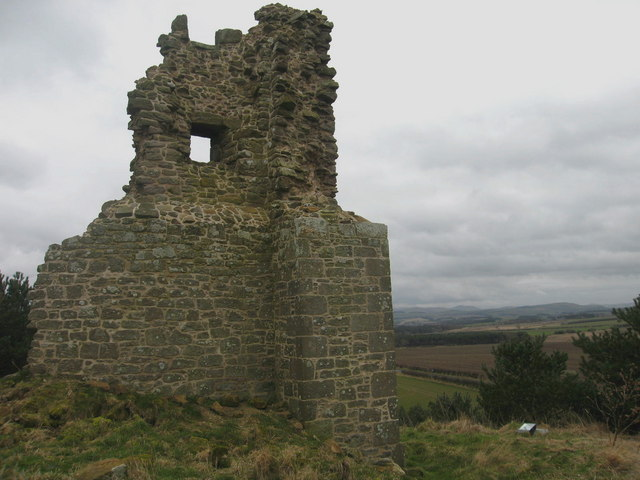
- Duddo Tower

- Location within Northumberland
- Population: 210 (2011 Census)
- OS grid reference: NT9342
- Civil parish: Duddo
- Unitary authority: Northumberland
- Ceremonial county: Northumberland
- Region: North East
- Country: England
- Sovereign state: United Kingdom
- Post town: Berwick-upon-Tweed
- Postcode district: TD15
- Dialling code: 01289
- Police: Northumbria
- Fire: Northumberland
- Ambulance: North East
- UK Parliament: North Northumberland
- Website: Duddo Community Website

Duddo is a village and civil parish in Northumberland, about 8 miles (13 km) southwest of Berwick-upon-Tweed.

== History ==
Duddo Five Stones is a stone circle to the north of the village. It is a Scheduled Monument.

Duddo Tower, south of the village, was built late in the 16th century. It is now a ruin and a Scheduled Monument. It replaced an earlier tower built in 1496.

== Churches and school ==
The Church of England parish church of All Saints is a Gothic Revival building. It is in a Decorated Gothic style and was completed in 1879.

All Saints' church replaced the earlier parish church of St James the Great, which was designed by Ignatius Bonomi in a neo-Norman style and built in 1832. It was later converted into part of the parish school, presumably when All Saints' church was built. The school has since closed and the building is now a private house.

== Sources ==
- Pevsner, Nikolaus; Richmond, Ian A (1957). Northumberland. The Buildings of England. Harmondsworth: Penguin Books. p. 139.
