= Treaty of York =

1237 treaty between England and Scotland

Scriptum cirographatum inter Henricum Regem Anglie et Alexandrum Regem Scocie de comitatu Northumbrie Cumbrie et Westmerland factum coram Ottone Legato
- Signed: 25 September 1237
- Location: York
- Signatories: Henry III of England; Alexander II of Scotland
- Language: Latin

The Treaty of York was an agreement between the kings Henry III of England and Alexander II of Scotland, signed at York on 25 September 1237, which affirmed that Northumberland (which at the time also encompassed County Durham), Cumberland, and Westmorland were subject to English sovereignty. This established the Anglo-Scottish border in a form that remains almost unchanged to modern times (the only modifications have been regarding the Debatable Lands and Berwick-upon-Tweed). The treaty detailed the future status of several feudal properties and addressed other issues between the two kings, and historically marked the end of the Kingdom of Scotland's attempts to extend its frontier southward.

The treaty was one of a number of agreements made in the ongoing relationship between the two kings. The papal legate Otho of Tonengo was already in the Kingdom of England at Henry's request, to attend a synod in London in November 1237. Otho was informed in advance by Henry of the September meeting at York, which he attended. This meeting was recorded by the contemporary chronicler Matthew Paris, who disparaged both Alexander and Otho.

== The agreement ==
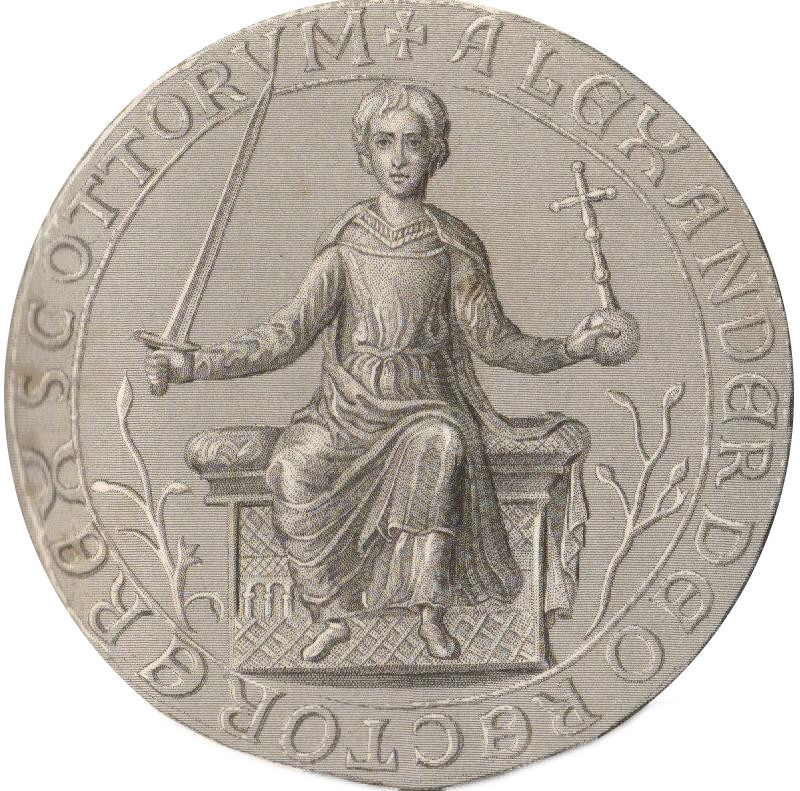
Steel engraving and enhancement of the Great Seal of Alexander II

Henry and Alexander had a history of making agreements to settle one matter or another, and related to this was their personal relationship. Alexander was married to Henry's sister Joan and Alexander's sister Margaret had married Hubert de Burgh, a former regent to Henry. On 13 August 1237 Henry advised Otho that he would meet Alexander at York to treat of peace. An agreement was reached on 25 September "respecting all claims, or competent to, the latter, up to Friday next before Michaelmas A.D. 1237".

The title of the agreement is Scriptum cirographatum inter Henricum Regem Anglie et Alexandrum Regem Scocie de comitatu Northumbrie Cumbrie et Westmerland factum coram Ottone Legato (Note: Cirograph written between Henry King of England and Alexander King of Scotland on the counties of Northumberland Cumberland and Westmoreland done in the presence of Legate Otho) and the particulars of the agreement are:

- The King of Scotland: quitclaims to the King of England his hereditary rights to the counties of Northumberland, Cumberland, and Westmorland; quitclaims 15,000 marks of silver paid by King William to King John for certain conventions not observed by the latter; and frees Henry from agreements regarding marriages between Henry and Richard, and Alexander's sisters Margaret, Isabella, and Marjory.
- The King of England grants the King of Scotland certain lands within Northumberland and Cumberland, to be held by him and his successor kings of Scotland in feudal tenure with certain rights exempting them from obligations common in feudal relationships, and with the Scottish Steward sitting in Justice regarding certain issues that may arise, and these, too, are hereditary to the King of Scotland's heirs, and regarding these the King of Scotland shall not be answerable to an English court of law in any suit.
- The King of Scotland makes his homage and fealty – de praedictis terris.
- Both kings respect previous writings not in conflict with this agreement, and any charters found regarding said counties to be restored to the King of England.

Although the border between Scotland and England was officially defined for the first time and by mutual agreement through the Treaty of York, historians have shown little interest in the agreement, either mentioning it in passing or ignoring it altogether. Stubbs does not mention it in his Constitutional History of England, nor does Hume in his History of England. Skene's Celtic Scotland refers to it as an agreement in his background discussion for the reign of Alexander II's successor, Alexander III, while Burton's History of Scotland mentions that claims of land were discussed in 1237 and briefly describes some of them, but makes no reference to an agreement or treaty. James Hill Ramsay's Dawn of the Constitution gives a fuller discussion of the agreement, but does not give it any particular prominence.

== The account of Paris ==
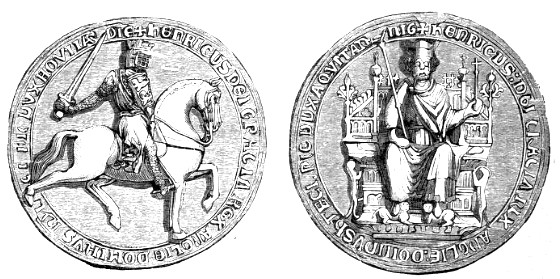
Engraving of Henry's great seal

The treaty gained additional prominence due to the chronicler Matthew Paris (c. 1200–1259), who is known for his rhetorical passion and his invectives against those with whom he disagreed. Paris describes the Papal legate Otho in negative terms, as someone who was weak and timid in the face of strength but overbearing in his use of power over others, and as someone who avariciously accumulated a large amount of money. He describes Alexander and Henry as having a mutual hatred in 1236, with Alexander threatening to invade England. He describes the 1237 meeting at York as the result of Henry's and Otho's invitation to Alexander, and that when Otho expressed an interest in visiting Scotland, Alexander claimed no legate had ever visited Scotland and he would not allow it, and that if Otho does enter Scotland he should take care that harm does not befall him. Paris goes on to say that in 1239 as Otho was leaving for Scotland, that when Alexander had previously met with Otho in 1237 he had become so excited in his hostility at the possibility of Otho's visit to Scotland that a written agreement had to be drawn up concerning Otho's visit.

== See also ==
- Treaty of York (1464)
- List of treaties
