= Timpanheck =

Coordinates: 55.058°N 3.063°W

Timpanheck is a village in Annandale, Scottish Borders.
