= Blackpool Gate =

Settlement in Cumbria, England

Coordinates: 55.091°N 2.734°W

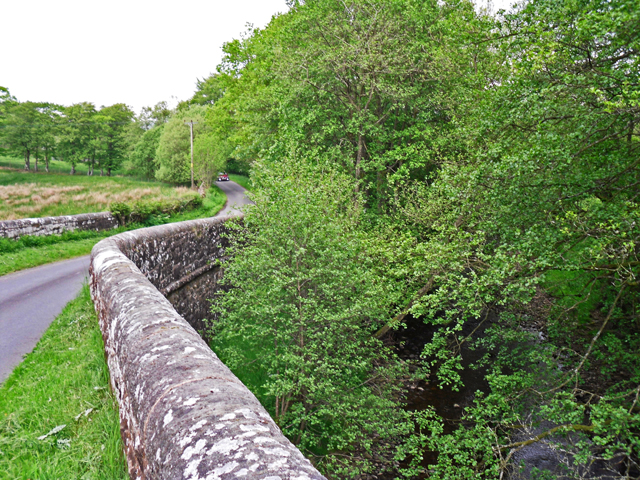
- Blackpool Gate Bridge

- Location in the former Carlisle district, Cumbria Location within Cumbria
- OS grid reference: NY532777
- Civil parish: Bewcastle
- Unitary authority: Cumberland
- Ceremonial county: Cumbria
- Region: North West
- Country: England
- Sovereign state: United Kingdom
- Post town: CARLISLE
- Postcode district: CA6
- Dialling code: 016977
- Police: Cumbria
- Fire: Cumbria
- Ambulance: North West
- UK Parliament: Carlisle

Blackpool Gate is a settlement in the civil parish of Bewcastle, which is in the district of the Cumberland in the county of Cumbria, England. It is in the historic county of Cumberland.

Blackpool Gate lies some five miles south of the border with Scotland and has existed since Roman occupation.
