= Auchenrivock Tower =

- Near Langholm, Dumfries and Galloway, Scotland; UK grid reference NY372805

Site information
- Type: L-Plan Tower house
- Owner: Buccleuch estate
- Open to the public: No
- Condition: Ruined

Location
- Shown within Scotland
- Coordinates: 55.115353°N 2.985301°W

Site history
- Built: Late 16th Century
- Materials: Stone

Auchenrivock Tower is a ruined late 16th century tower house situated near Langholm, Dumfries and Galloway. The remains of the tower, which rise 8 feet at their highest, are currently built into a garden wall.

An earlier stronghold of the Irvings of Eskdale, called Stakehugh, lay near the current site.

The place name Auchenrivock is derived from the Scottish Gaelic, Achadh Riabhach, meaning "brindled field".
