= River Sark =

River on the border of England and Scotland

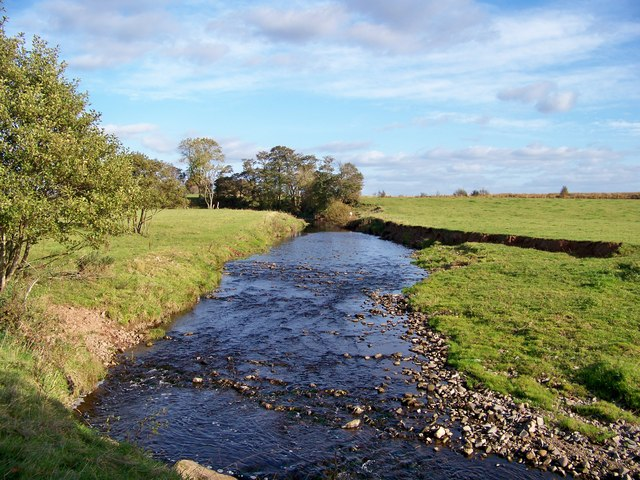
River Sark near Springfield

The River Sark or Sark Water is a river forming part of the western border between Scotland and England. Most of its length is entirely in Scotland. It flows into the estuary of the River Esk just south of Gretna.

== History ==
The Scots defeated the English at the Battle of Sark in October 1448. It was a significant victory for the Scots, who had not defeated England since the Battle of Otterburn in 1388.

The first verse of Robert Burns' poem Such a Parcel of Rogues in a Nation says:

Fareweel to a' our Scottish fame,
Fareweel our ancient glory;
Fareweel ev'n to the Scottish name,
Sae fam'd in martial story.
Now Sark rins over Solway sands,
An' Tweed rins to the ocean,
To mark where England's province stands-
Such a parcel of rogues in a nation!"

The poem's subject was the alleged sale of Scotland in the Anglo-Scottish Treaty of Union. The town of Gretna Green on the Sark is known for its wedding industry.

The area around the Sark was marshy and sandy, as much of the coast of the north west Irish Sea is. The small section between the lower end of the Sark and the River Esk is known as the "debatable lands", and was formerly a haven for criminals and outlaws who wished to exploit the weakness of the two countries' border defences. The boundary between the Sark and the Esk is called the Scots' Dike.
