= Mangerton Tower =

Tower house, now ruined, in Scottish Borders, Scotland

Coordinates: 55.15964°N 2.81806°W

Mangerton Tower is a ruined Scottish tower castle house formerly belonging to the Armstrong family.

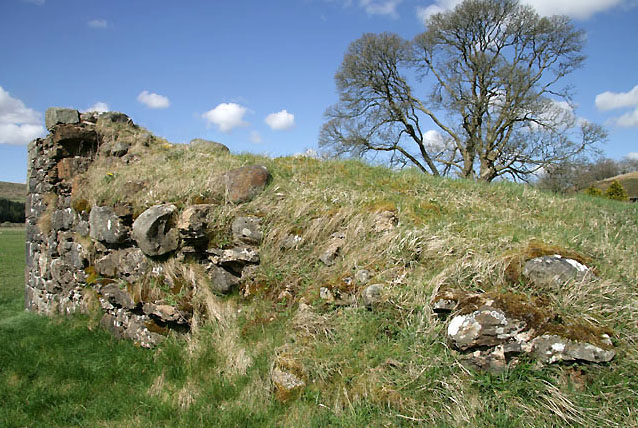
Ruins of Mangerton Tower

Mangerton Tower is at Mangerton in Newcastleton or Castleton parish in Roxburghshire, close to the border between England and Scotland, on the banks of the Liddel Water.

== History ==
The tower was burnt by the English commander Ralph Eure in 1543 in revenge for fire raising in Tynedale. Hector Armstrong murdered Bartye Young, whose friend had guided Eure to Mangerton.

In March 1569 Regent Moray came from Kelso to Liddesdale to punish the border people. He was accompanied by Lord Home, Ker of Cessford, Ker of Ferniehirst, and Scot of Buccleuch and 4000 men. After holding unsatisfactory talks with the local leaders, "the best of the surname men", Moray burned the farmsteads in Liddesdale, and did not leave one house standing. He stayed at Mangerton, then had the house blown up with gunpowder and returned to Jedburgh. He was unable to capture Armstrong of Mangerton.

In 1592 the Laird of Mangerton had helped the rebel Francis Stewart, 5th Earl of Bothwell. James VI went to Jedburgh intending to punish Bothwell's supporters and demolish Mangerton, Whithaugh, and other houses. Whithaugh was another house of Armstrong family, just north of Mangerton. The Duke of Lennox started work on the demolition of Whithaugh and stopped when the Laird yielded to him. Armstrong of Mangerton made his peace with the king and his house was left intact.

The Armstrongs of Whithaugh crossed the English border on 8 June 1597 and attacked travellers on Turnlippet Moor who were going to Newcastle. In September 1601 the English border warden Lord Scrope "laid waste" to Mangerton in retaliation for border raids in the aftermath of the murder of Sir John Carmichael. Scrope wrote to James VI to justify capturing 16 nororious "rievers and spoilers" at the "stone house of Mangerton".

Only a part of the ground floor of Mangerton Tower remains. A stone panel has a coat of arms and the date 1563, with the initials "SA" and "E", or 1583 with "SA" and "FF".

== Armstrong family ==
Johnnie Armstrong, a brother of Thomas Armstrong, Laird of Mangerton, was a well-known outlaw who was captured and hanged by James V of Scotland at Caerlanrig in 1530.

Mungo Armstrong became a spy for the English border officer Thomas Wharton. In December 1540 he was at Hermitage Castle and received a copy of a ballad from Edinburgh. He brought it to Carlisle for Wharton, letting the Mayor of Carlisle, John Thomson, make a copy of it.

In 1541 Archibald Armstrong, the young laird of Mangerton, with his servant John Grey, who was blind in one eye, went into England with others and burnt the corn of William Carnaby at Halton.

An English border official Thomas Musgrave listed many members of the Armstrong families of Mangerton, Whithaugh, and Langholm, and their relations in 1583. They had kin on both sides of the border.

The Laird of Mangerton and Christie Armstrong of Barngleis were prisoners in Edinburgh Castle in October 1588. In July 1591 the Laird was ordered to surrender John Jokke Armstrong as a pledgee for the "gang of Mangertoun".

The court jester to James VI and I, Archibald Armstrong, was a relative of the Mangerton family. In 1617 Archibald Armstrong obtained a royal pension of £50 yearly for his Scottish kinsman, John of the Syde, an Armstrong from Mangerton.
