= Gilnockie Tower =

Tower house in Dumfries and Galloway, Scotland

- Hollows, near Canonbie, Dumfries and Galloway, Scotland; UK grid reference NY3822378579
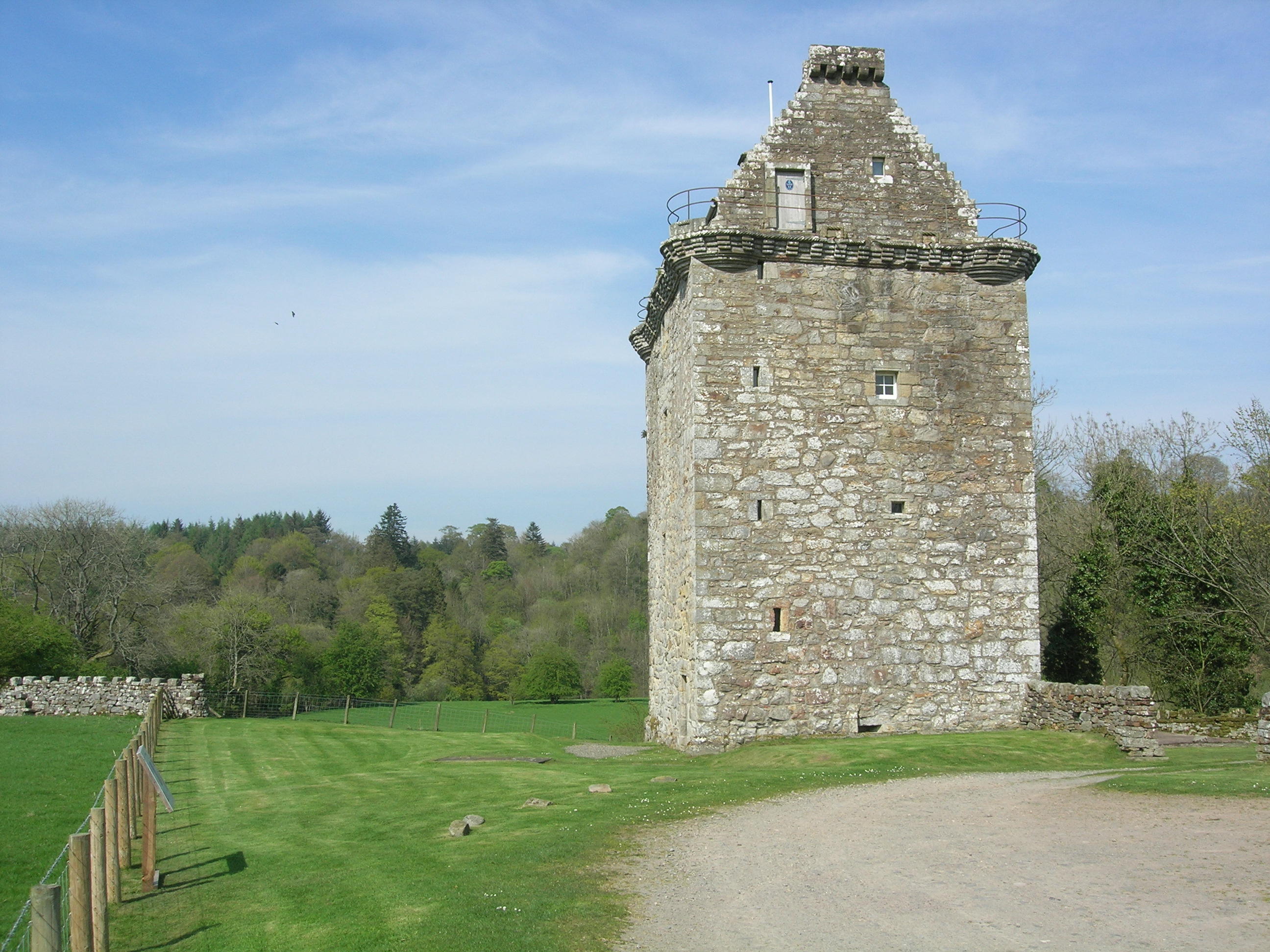
- Gilnockie Tower, viewed from the south.

Site information
- Type: Oblong plan Tower house
- Owner: Clan Armstrong Centre - Scottish Registered Charity
- Open to the public: Yes
- Condition: Restored 2014–18

Location
- Shown within Scotland
- Coordinates: 55.097801°N 2.969654°W
- Height: 38 feet (parapet); 44 feet (beacon of south gable)

Site history
- Materials: Cream sandstone

Gilnockie Tower is a 17th-century tower house, located at the hamlet of Hollows, 2.2 km north of Canonbie, in Dumfriesshire, south-west Scotland. The tower is situated on the west bank of the River Esk. It was originally known as Hollows Tower.

Gilnockie Castle is a separate, but nearby site.

== History ==
The name Gilnockie is from the Scottish Gaelic Geal Cnocan meaning 'Little White Hill'. Hollows was built around 1520 by Johnnie Armstrong, famous Border outlaw and younger brother of Thomas Armstrong of Mangerton. In 1528, the tower was burned by Sir Christopher Dacre, English Warden of the Western Marches, and in 1530 Johnnie and 50 followers were hanged by James V, after being tricked into joining a hunting party, an event recorded in the ballad "Johnnie Armstrong".

The tower was rebuilt, but was damaged again by English raids in the 1540s, only to be rebuilt again with a new parapet walk, and a beacon stance on the gable.

=== Restoration ===
In 1978, the tower was a roofless ruin, when it was bought by Major T.C.R. Armstrong-Wilson, who undertook a full restoration. It was re-roofed, and floors were reconstructed at four levels. Authentic oak doors were fitted to all rooms. The interior was plastered out, and electricity and water taken into the building. The tower is a Category A listed building, and all work was carried out in consultation with the Scottish Development Department (Ancient Monuments). In January 2015, the tower was closed to the public and major repairs were commenced. The principal behind these repairs was to take the building back to as near possible of how it would have looked in the 16th century. It was also necessary to ensure that the building met the safety standards required of a 21st century visitor centre. The repairs were completed in 2018 and on 1 April 2018, Gilnockie Tower and the Clan Armstrong Centre were opened to the public. The building now consists of an authentic clan leaders house complete with furnished Grand Hall and Master Bedroom. The tower also houses the Clan Armstrong Museum, previously located in the Episcopal Church in Langholm. Many artefacts relating to the Clan Armstrong are on display and there is a special section devoted to Neil Armstrong, the First Man on the Moon. In 2019, Gilnockie Tower was awarded a four-star rating from Visit Scotland as a visitor centre. It is internationally recognised as the ancestral home of the Armstrong Clan.

== The tower ==
Gilnockie Tower is a simple rubble-built tower house of four storeys plus an attic, measuring around 10 by 7.6 metres at the base. The basement comprises a vaulted cellar, with gun loops to south, west and north. A spiral stair in the south-west corner leads up to the first floor, devoted to a hall. Above this are two further rooms, with the attic space above between the crow-stepped gables. At the top of the wall, corbels show the presence of a parapet walk. During the repair programme carried out between 2015 and 2018, the walkway was sympathetically brought up to date to meet safety standards. This included the installation of a safety fence. A notable feature is the beacon stance, corbelled out from the south gable at the highest point of the building.

The oldest part of the tower is thought to be the large stone by the doorway into the basement. Carvings of spirals and a key-like symbol are believed to date from the 2nd millennium BC, with the slab having been reused in the building.

== Gilnockie Castle ==
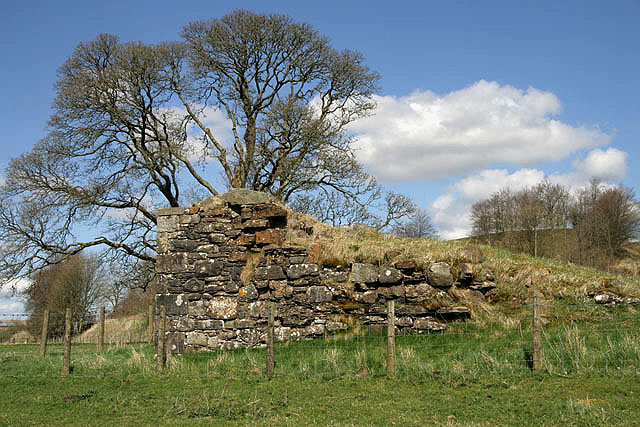
Remains of Mangerton Tower, Mangerton

The site now known as Gilnockie Castle lies near Canonbie at the east end of Gilnockie Bridge, which crosses the Esk in Hollows, just 500 m to the south east (NY386782). Today, only an earthwork remains, and there is some doubt as to whether a tower stood there, although it is possible that the earlier tower destroyed in 1528 was located there. It is associated with Johnnie Armstrong, Laird of Gilnockie.

== See also ==
- William Armstrong, one-time owner of the castle
