= Dinlabyre =

Village in Scottish Borders, Scotland, UK

Coordinates: 55.2198°N 2.7445°W

Dinlabyre is a village on the B6357 in Liddesdale, on the edge of the Newcastleton Forest, close to Castleton, in the Scottish Borders area of Scotland, in the former Roxburghshire.

Places nearby include Hermitage, Hermitage Castle, the Hermitage Water, Newcastleton, Newlands, Old Castleton, Riccarton Junction railway station, Saughtree, and the Wauchope Forest.

== See also ==
- List of places in the Scottish Borders
- List of places in Northumberland
