= Liddel Strength =

Ancient monument in England

Coordinates: 55.0584°N 2.9379°W

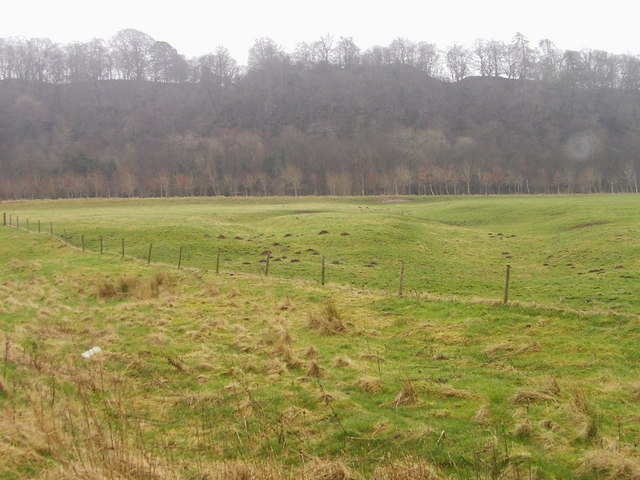
Liddel Strength (in trees on skyline)

Liddel Strength is an ancient monument near Carwinley, Cumbria, in northwest England. It consists of the earthwork remains of an Anglo-Norman border fortification (the seat of the barony of Liddel) destroyed by the Scots in 1346 (a wooden motte and bailey castle at the time of its destruction; possibly earlier a ringwork) and fragmentary remains of a pele tower subsequently built upon the site. It lies on a cliff on the south bank of the Liddel Water, overlooking the Liddel Water's confluence with the River Esk; the last high ground before the Esk reaches the Solway Plain. The Liddel Water (upstream of the confluence) and the Esk (downstream) form the modern Anglo-Scottish border; formerly they were the southern boundary of the Debatable Lands.

== Other names and potential misidentification ==
It has also been known as Liddel Moat (and has given its name to Moat Quarter (in which it lies) of Kirkandrews-on-Esk parish) and the castle is referred to in mediaeval documents as the Peel of Liddell or the castle of Liddel. However, it is not the same as - although sometimes (understandably) confused with - Liddel Castle (also known as Liddel Motte) (much further up Liddesdale at Castleton beyond the modern Newcastleton (also known as Copshaw Holm). Liddel Strength was the seat of the barony of Liddel (on the English side of the current border); there was also a barony of Liddesdale (on the Scots side of the current border), whose seat was originally the Liddel Castle in Upper Liddesdale (built and held by the De Soules), later superseded by Hermitage Castle (occasionally referred to as the strength of Liddesdale); at his death in 1300, John Wake held both baronies from the King of England, but they were his lands of Liddel and the Hermitage. The border was not stable in the Middle Ages, and both castles have been in the other country at some point. As a further complication, Canonbie, immediately upstream of Liddel Strength, takes its name from a canonry originally known as the religious house of Liddel; Canonbie church being sometimes referred to in the Middle Ages as the church of Liddel.

== Postulated pre-Conquest significance ==
A Roman road ran up Eskdale east of the river, and passed just to the east of the site of Liddel Strength. It was suggested by William Forbes Skene in the 19th century that 'Carwinley' is a corruption of Caer Wenddolau or Gwenddolau's Fort and that the impressive ditch and rampart significantly pre-date the castle and protected a stronghold of Gwenddoleu ap Ceidio, a Celtic ruler defeated and killed at the Battle of Arfderydd in 573, which in this interpretation took place at Arthuret - 'Arturethe' in medieval documents. A 15th-century manuscript in the British Library (MS Cotton Titus A XIX) contains the tale of 'Lailoken and Kentigern' in which St Kentigern meets a naked, hairy, madman (Lailoken - probably the original name of Merlin) - driven mad by a terrible battle fought upon the plain that lay between Liddel and Carwannock. The identification from correspondence of placenames is far from certain - whilst Skene's equation of Ardderyd with Arthuret is now generally accepted Arthuret parish contains (within a mile of Carwinley) another candidate for Caer Wenddolau - the Roman fort of Castra Exploratorum whose remains impressed early antiquarians but were invisible to Skene, having been obliterated by Netherby Hall. (At a meeting of the Cumberland and Westmorland Antiquarian and Archaeological Society held at the site in 1926 a paper read by R W Collingwood, dismissed any possibility that the Strength 'long ... an object of antiquarian interest, not always well-informed.' was pre-Conquest.)

== Barony of Liddel ==
The barony of Liddel had an extent roughly that of the modern parishes of Arthuret, Kirkandrews-on-Esk and Nicholforest. It is thought to have been created by Ranulf le Meschin, 3rd Earl of Chester in or before the first decade of the 12th century and given by him to Turgis Brandos, descending by his son William Brandos (probably also known as William of Rosedale) to Turgis/Turgot de Rossedale (Rosedale in Yorkshire). However 'Benedict of Peterborough' reports that in 1174, whilst besieging Carlisle William the Lion ...went in person with the remaining part of his army through Northumbria, wasting the lands of the king and of his barons; and took with his arms the castle of Liddell, which belonged to Nicholas de Estuteville ... It is not clear how Nicholas de Stuteville had supplanted the de Rosedales, but he was well connected; the second son of a High Sheriff of Yorkshire and his grandfather had been one of the Yorkshire magnates present at the Battle of the Standard. Henry II seems to have favoured the family; two of the other castles taken by William were the responsibility of Stutevilles; a Stuteville was in the party of knights that captured William at Alnwick later in 1174, and Henry installed Stutevilles as castellans in two of the castles William surrendered to Henry. Although Nicholas's branch of the Stutevilles were Barons of Liddell, Liddel was never their principal seat; that lay at Cottingham in the East Riding of Yorkshire where in 1200 they entertained King John, and were granted a licence to fortify and moat their manor house in 1201.

The Stuteville estates passed by marriage into the le Wake family (whose principal seat was at Bourne, Lincolnshire), and in 1346 the castle belonged to the noble baron Sir Thomas Wake, lord of Liddel as he was described by the Lanercost Chronicle in its account of an English incursion into Scotland (intended to be major, but restricted to a 12-day raid by bad weather) he led in 1337. Wake was one of 'the Disinherited' (those who had lost their Scottish holdings as a result of the battle of Bannockburn) and fought at Dupplin Moor. Wake and his sister Margaret had both married Plantagenets; he was the son-in-law of Henry, 3rd Earl of Lancaster, she (having first married a son of the Comyn slain by Robert the Bruce, only to be widowed when he was killed at Bannockburn) had married - and was now the widow of - Edmund of Woodstock, 1st Earl of Kent, by whom she was mother of the 'Fair Maid of Kent' (although Margaret did not live long enough to be mother-in-law to the Black Prince).

== Castle ==
A fortification of some sort would have been needed from the earliest stage of the barony and a grant of land to Canonby priory in 1165 by Guy de Rossedale carries with it the rights to fishing on the Liddel from the 'foss' of Liddel up to the church. The first definite mention of a castle is in Benedict of Peterborough (noted above.) Its name is potentially misleading; it was certainly more than the fortified towerhouse which most surviving peles are, but even when first built - and certainly by the standards of the mid 14th century - a motte-and-bailey with a wooden palisade was not a particularly strong castle (it has been suggested that 'Strength' translates the Latin fortalitium more usually rendered as fortalice, meaning a small (or second-rate) fort). The earthworks consist of a motte in an inner bailey with a weaker outer bailey attached. The inner bailey earthworks are massive (about 48m by 58m with an 8m rise from the bottom of the ditch to the top of the surviving bank) but form only a semi-circle, the 150-ft steep drop to the river being relied upon on the north side. The fortifications enclose an area of 3.5 - 4 acres (c 1.5 hectare). There is no ditch between the motte and the inner bailey, supporting the theory that the motte was back-fitted to a previously constructed ringwork. In the 1280s the castle is known to have had a timber hall with two solars and cellars, with associated ancillary buildings (kitchen, granary, byre, grange and chapel) presumably also timber, with some buildings in bad repair. In 1300 an indenture was entered into for 'repairing the mote and the fosses around; strengthening and re-dressing the same and the pele and the palisades, and making lodges within the mote, if necessary, for the safety of the men at arms of the garrison.'

== Capture and destruction of the castle (1346) ==
In October 1346 King David II, in accordance with his treaty with Philip VI of France, who pointed out that Edward III of England was so fully committed to the siege of Calais that Northern England would be defenceless, invaded England with a force estimated at about 12,000 men, some supplied with modern equipment by the French. He began his campaign, which ended at the Battle of Neville's Cross, by attacking Liddel Strength.

In October 1346 the garrison of Liddel Strength was under the command of Sir Walter de Selby. Selby is described by Geoffrey the Baker as dominus Gualterus de Seleby, miles magne probitatis but had had a colourful earlier career. He had been an adherent of Thomas, 2nd Earl of Lancaster, and more specifically an accomplice of Sir Gilbert de Middleton who in the aftermath of Bannockburn had ravaged and blackmailed the land surrounding Mitford Castle in Northumberland until he went too far. At Rushyford in County Durham in 1317 Sir Gilbert seized and robbed two cardinals who had landed in England not long before, because they came in the company of the aforesaid Louis de Belmont in order to consecrate him Bishop of Durham. Mitford Castle was captured swiftly thereafter and Sir Gilbert taken to London, where he was hanged drawn and quartered in the presence of the cardinals, but Selby escaped to Scotland. When Robert the Bruce captured Mitford Castle by guile in 1318 he made Selby his castellan to hold it for the Scots but in 1321, during a 2-year truce, Selby surrendered it to Robert de Umfreville and others on condition that they persuade Edward II to restore Selby's forfeited lands. This Edward refused to do and Selby was imprisoned in the Tower of London until 1327 (when many prisoners with affiliations to Thomas of Lancaster were released following the deposition of Edward II) Edward III gave him a general pardon, and after an enquiry into his case restored to him such of his lands as remained in the King's hands. Thereafter Selby was a loyal subject; he was knighted, and served Edward Baliol, who, in 1332, gave him the barony of Plenderleith, in Roxburghshire.

In 1337 he was made (or was approached to become) constable of Bothwell Castle, Edward III's headquarters in Scotland, but the castle was besieged, retaken and slighted by the Scots later that same year. In March 1345/6, when Englishmen crossed the Esk and 'lifted' £1000-worth of cattle and gear from the Scots side, Selby was one of five local knights commanded to investigate and report to the King's council

The Scottish vanguard, led by William Douglas, Lord of Liddesdale arrived before Liddel Strength in the morning of October 6, 1346, David and the main force arriving by evening. No attempt was made on the Strength until on the fourth day, having armed themselves before sunrise with spears, stones, swords and clubs, they delivered assaults from all quarters upon the aforesaid fortress and its defenders. Thus both those within and without the fortress fought fiercely, many being wounded and some slain; until at length some of the Scottish party furnished with beams and housetimbers, earth, stones and fascines, succeeded in filling up the ditches of the fortress. Then some of the Scots, protected by the shields of men-at-arms, broke through the bottom of the walls with iron tools and many of them entered the said fortress in this manner without more opposition. Knights and armed men entering the fortress killed all whom they found, with few exceptions, and thus obtained full possession of the fortress.

One of the exceptions was Walter de Selby: English chroniclers agree that David behaved poorly to him, but differ on the details. In Geoffrey le Baker's version of events, he was brought before King David and pleaded for mercy (i.e. to be held for ransom); the King's response was to have two of Selby's sons strangled to death before his eyes before having the father, almost mad with sorrow, beheaded. However, a son of Walter's proved his right to the barony of Plenderleith in 1357, the explanation for the delay being the said James, at the time when his father Walter was slain by the Scots in the pele of Lydelle, was taken, and remained prisoner with them for 8 years and more, and could not sue his right The Lanercost Chronicle says instead that Selby accepted that he was to die; the favour he asked of David was to be given a weapon that he might die by combat as befitted a knight; not only did David refuse him this but he had him executed unshriven, that is, without opportunity to confess his sins to a priest.

The castle was never rebuilt. When Thomas Wake died in June 1349, the manor of Liddel was valued at £70 16s. 2d., whereof the site of the castle and manor destroyed is worth 6d; the title passed to Margaret who died within 3 months, but Thomas's widow Blanche, granted life-rent of Liddel, lived until 1380 when on her death Liddel utterly worthless because ravaged by the Scots passed to Henry Earl of Derby, the future Henry IV of England and thus eventually became part of the Duchy of Lancaster.
