= Ranulf I de Soules =

Norman knight (died before 1170)

Ranulf de Soules (Note: Also Ranulf de Soulis.) was a Norman knight who came to Scotland with David I and served as his cupbearer.

== Early life ==
Ranulf was probably born in the Cotentin Peninsula at Soules, the family's seigneurie near Saint-Lô. He was one of the group of young Normans whom David I gathered around him from Henry I of England's area of influence in northern France; he was therefore likely of a similar age to David. As David's tenant, Ranulf held Great Doddington on the former's Honour of Huntingdon. His ties to Great Doddington are confirmed when, as a settler in Scotland, he later granted the Church of Great Doddington,(Ecclesiam de Dodintona juxta Bertonam) to Jedburgh Abbey.

He apparently accompanied David to Cumbria around 1112 when the latter was essentially governor or titular earl of that region under England's King Henry and was encouraged by David to build Liddel Castle in Liddesdale to control that unruly area. Ranulf de Soulis built Liddel Castle, a motte and bailey structure, at the junction of the Liddel and Esk rivers. This castle, the earthworks of which remain, therefore was probably built around 1115–1118, although apparently the first written mention of it was in an 1165 charter that William the Lion granted to the Canons of Jedburgh Abbey. It is not to be confused with nearby Hermitage Castle, a later structure, or with Liddel Strength that was built in the same region, but just within England, by Turgot de Rossedale, from a Yorkshire family.

== Cupbearer ==
David appointed him as his Cup-bearer, the first person in the Norman tradition to hold that office in Scotland; after David's death he was cupbearer to Malcolm IV and later to William the Lion in the early part of his reign. The cupbearer (pincerna (Note: Pincerna has been variously translated as butler, cup bearer, treasurer and food keeper. Owen states that the general management of the royal household was in the hands of the stewards (seneschals), who were also of noble rank. The pincerna was probably under their direction, just as members of lesser nobility, such as the doorwards (or ushers), served under the Royal Chamberlain.) or butler) was not a major official at court, but it and other similar appointments gave their possessors influence at court and in affairs of state beyond the duties implied by their titles. Essentially, they became confidants and advisors to the King. The court was highly mobile in these times and court officials, such as the cupbearer, would often accompany the King on his excursions. Ranulf de Soulis witnessed a number of David's, and later Malcolm IV's and William's charters. (Note: The charter, as legal evidence in writing of the right to hold freehold property, was introduced into Scotland by David I, or possibly by his predecessor, Alexander. It was essentially a title deed.)

== Legacy ==
According to Laurie, Ranulf died shortly before 1170. He was succeeded as Lord of Liddesdale by his nephew, who was also named Ranulf and who was the son of his brother, William.
