= Liddel Castle =

Coordinates: 55.2015°N 2.7716°W

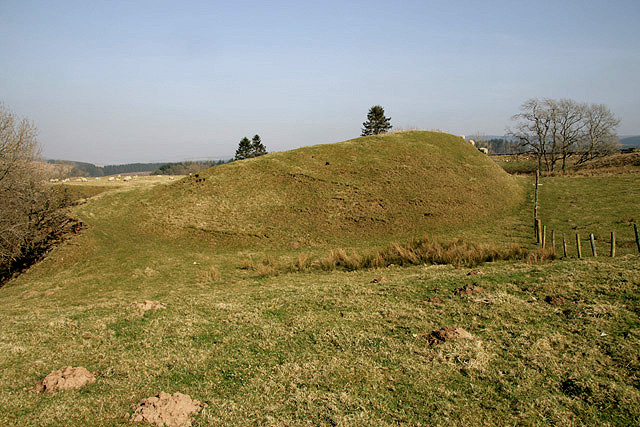
- Earthworks are all that remains of Liddel Castle
- Interactive map of the Liddel Castle area

General information
- Location: Scottish Borders, Liddesdale, Scotland
- Completed: 12th century

Liddel Castle is a ruined castle in Liddesdale, by the Liddel Water, near Castleton in the Scottish Borders area of Scotland, in the former county of Roxburghshire. Liddel Castle is a scheduled monument.

== History ==
A motte and bailey castle was built by Ranulf I de Soules in the 12th century after being granted the Lordship of Liddesdale by David I of Scotland. The castle was constructed on a bluff above the east bank of Liddel Water and protected on two sides by the Kirk Cleuch Burn. Liddel castle probably served as the caput of the barony.

During the Scottish Wars of Independence, Edward I of England visited the castle in 1296 and 1298. The castle appears to have been abandoned by the early 14th century.

== See also ==
- Anglo-Scottish border
- List of places in the Scottish Borders
- List of places in Scotland
