= Saughtree =

Village in Scottish Borders, Scotland, UK

Coordinates: 55°16′N 2°41′W

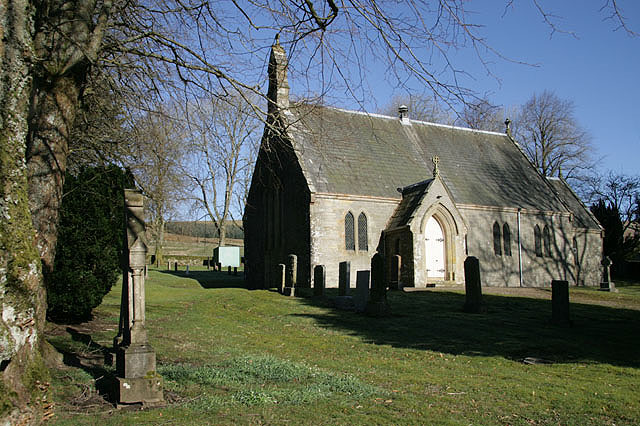
Liddesdale Parish Church

Saughtree (/ˈsɔːxtriː/) (Scots: Sauchtree) is a hamlet in the Scottish Borders at the junction of the B6357 and an unnamed road from Kielder village in Northumberland, England. It is at the confluence of the Liddel Water and Dawston Burn, in Liddesdale. The nearest settlements on the B6357 are Bonchester Bridge (13 km to the north east), Newcastleton (13 km to the south west) and Kielder village (11 km to the south east). It is approximately 6 km from the border with England.

Saughtree Fell is a hill which rises to 450m. Saughtree Church was built in 1875 and is in the Parish of Castleton. The former manse next to the church was built in 1891.

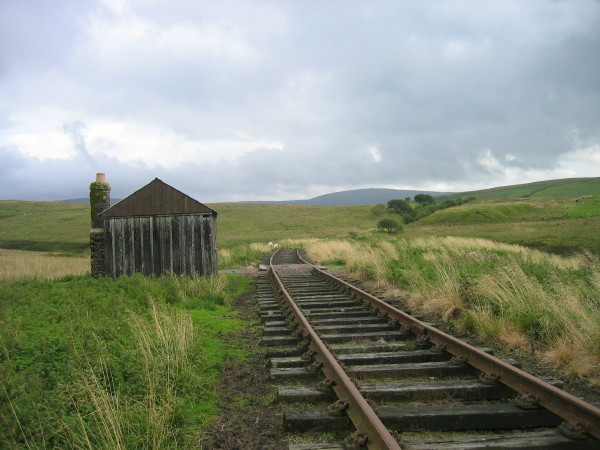
The railway line and platelayers hut at Saughtree Station

Saughtree railway station, near Riccarton Junction railway station is now a private dwelling. The station buildings now provide self catering accommodation. Saughtree Railway Viaduct has been demolished. Places nearby include Castleton, Dinlabyre, Hermitage Castle, the Hermitage Water. the Wauchope Forest, and the Newcastleton Forest.

== See also ==
- List of places in the Scottish Borders
