= Clan Eliott =

Scottish clan

- Elloch, Eloth
- Crest: Raised fist holding a sword
- Motto: Fortiter et recte (Boldly and rightly)

Profile
- Region: Borders
- District: Dumfries and Galloway
- Plant badge: White hawthorn
- Pipe music: "All The Blue Bonnets Are Over The Border", Sir Walter Scott

Chief
- Margaret Eliott of Redheugh
- 29th Elliot Clan Chief
- Historic seat: Redheugh Tower
Clan branches
- Eliotts of Redheugh (chiefs)
- Eliotts of Minto
- Eliotts of Stobs
Allied clans
Clan Armstrong
Rival clans
- Clan Scott
- Clan Kerr
- Clan Douglas
- Clan Maxwell

Clan Eliott is a Border Reiver Scottish clan.

== History ==
=== Origins of the clan ===
The origins of the Eliotts is surrounded in obscurity. The Eliotts suddenly appear as a distinct clan with a chief in the late 15th century. The lack of information is believed to be due to the destruction of their old castle at Stobs in a fire in 1712. All of the family documents, with one exception were lost in the fire.

According to tradition the Ellots (as the name was originally spelled) came from the foot of Glenshie in Angus and that they moved to Teviotdale during the time of Robert the Bruce. Such a move would have been exceptional; however an event in 1320 gives some credence to the story. In 1320 William de Soulis, one of Scotland's most powerful nobles was convicted of treason against Robert the Bruce. He was imprisoned for life and his lands of Liddesdale along with the great fortress of Hermitage Castle were made over to Bruce's illegitimate son, Robert Bruce, Lord of Liddesdale. Bruce would have needed to ensure his hold on such a strategically important frontier by encouraging the settlement of a loyal and tested clan - such as the Ellots.

=== 15th century ===
It is known that Ellot of Redheugh was living in the early 1400s. In 1426 John Elwalde of Teviotdale is recorded. In 1476 Robert Ellot of Redheugh appears as the tenth chief of the clan. From that time onwards the formal history of the clan can be said to have begun. Robert Ellot built a strong tower on a cliff overlooking the ford on Hermitage Water in 1470. This was just one of about one hundred strong towers that were dotted around Liddesdale which belonged to the Ellots and which they shared with the Clan Armstrong who were another Border Reiver clan.

=== 16th century and clan conflicts ===
Robert Ellot, the thirteenth chief was killed at the Battle of Flodden in 1513. The Eliotts supported Scott of Buccleuch at the Battle of Melrose in 1526. However, in 1565 a deadly feud arose between the Ellots and their neighbours, the Clan Scott. Scott of Buccleuch executed four Ellots for the minor crime of cattle rustling. In response three hundred Ellots rode to avenge the fate of their kinsmen. During the battle losses on both sides were heavy but eventually the two clans came to terms with each other.

Another feud took place between the Ellots and James Hepburn, 4th Earl of Bothwell, the future husband of Mary, Queen of Scots. A skirmish took place around Hermitage Castle in which the earl was wounded. In reprisal, in 1569, a royal force of nearly four thousand men devastated the Ellot's lands.

=== 17th, 18th and 19th centuries ===
In 1603 the Union of the Crowns marked the end of the border reivers. Many people were executed and many of the Borderers found new lives in Ulster when much of that province was colonised.

Robert Eliott of Redheugh left his broad lands in Liddesdale and went into exile in Fife. The use of the letter "i" in the Ellot surname was introduced in about 1650.

In 1666 Sir Gillbert Eliott of Stobs was created a Baronet of Nova Scotia by Charles II of England. He became chief of the Clan Eliott in 1673.

In 1764 the third Baronet remodelled the old Tower of Stobs into a mansion house. His second son was George Augustus Eliott who was rewarded for a spirited defense of Gibraltar in 1782.

A branch of the chief's family acquired the lands of Minto in 1703. Gilbert Elliot-Murray-Kynynmound, 1st Earl of Minto was a diplomat who served in Corsica and Vienna. He later became Governor General of Bengal.

== Clan Chief ==
The chief of Clan Eliott is Madam Margaret Eliott of Redheugh, 29th Chief of the Name and Arms of Eliott. The present chief is the daughter of Sir Arthur Eliott, eleventh baronet and twenty-eighth chief of Clan Eliott. There is no bar on females succeeding to Scottish chiefships but the baronetcy passed to a male heir.

The crest badge used by clan members consists of a crest encircled by a strap and buckle containing a motto. The crest is a raised fist holding a sword, while the motto is FORTITER ET RECTE (translation from Latin: "Boldly and Rightly").

== Castles ==
- Redheugh Tower was the historic seat of the chiefs of Clan Eliott, the Eliotts of Redheugh.
- Minto House was the seat Eliott Earls of Minto. However it has now been demolished.
- The Tower of Stobs was the seat of the Eliotts of Stobs.

== Tartan ==
Tartan image	Notes	Tartan image
	Clan Elliot tartan. There are two different versions of the Elliot tartan available today. Although very similar, the two vary slightly. The modern tartan and the ancient tartan vary in the intensity of the colors. The ancient version uses lighter colors, as the dyes were made from plants and berries. The dark stripes appear to be a dark burgundy or brown, and the blue is a lighter shade. The modern version (pictured at left) makes use of the stronger, modern chemical dyes and therefore result in a brighter, bolder color. On this one, the dark stripes appear almost black, and the blue is almost a sapphire blue. Also, the width of colored bands differs, with the ancient tartan being more condensed, with finer lines.	

== See also ==
- Scottish clan
- USS Elliot (DD-967)
