= Nicholas I de Soules =

Scottish noble

Nicholas de Soules (died 1264), Lord of Liddesdale and Butler of Scotland, was a 13th-century Scottish Border noble.

== Life ==
Nicholas was the son of Fulk de Soules. He succeeded to the titles and positions of his father upon Fulk's death in 1227. Appointed to the position of sheriff of Roxburgh in 1237, he started construction of Hermitage Castle in Liddesdale in the early 1240s. He inherited via his wife, Stamfordham and Stokesfeud in Northumberland in 1243. The construction of the castle at Hermitage angered Henry III of England, who claimed that the castle was a threat to the north of England and led an army towards Scotland. The result was the Treaty of Newcastle between Scotland and England.

Nicholas died at Rouen, Normandy in 1264.

== Marriage and issue ==
Nicholas married Annora, daughter of John de Normanville, they are known to have had the following issue:

- William I de Soules of Liddesdale (died circa 1292), married Ermengarde Durward, had issue.
- John de Soules of Old Roxburgh (died 1310), married Margaret de Ardross, had issue.
- Thomas de Soules of Stamfordham (died circa 1304), married Alicia de Mulcastre.
