= List of listed buildings in Newlands, Scottish Borders =

This is a list of listed buildings in the parish of Newlands in the Scottish Borders, Scotland.

== List ==
Name	Location	Date Listed	Grid Ref. (Note: Sometimes known as OSGB36, the grid reference (where provided) is based on the British national grid reference system used by the Ordnance Survey. • "Guide to National Grid". Ordnance Survey. • "Get-a-map". Ordnance Survey.)	Geo-coordinates	Notes	LB Number (Note: Historic Environment Scotland assign a unique alphanumeric identifier to each designated site in Scotland, for listed buildings this always begins with "LB", for example "LB12345".)	Image
The Steak House Romanno Bridge				55°43′07″N 3°20′16″W	Category B	15142	Upload Photo
Romanno Bridge Hotel And Adjoining House And Two Cottages				55°43′05″N 3°20′14″W	Category B	15166	Upload Photo
Tarth Bridge Over Tarth Water				55°40′21″N 3°19′50″W	Category C(S)	15172	Upload Photo
Madrisa Farmhouse And Steading, Lamancha				55°45′28″N 3°16′00″W	Category C(S)	15179	Upload Photo
Flemington Tower				55°41′34″N 3°19′37″W	Category B	15152	Upload Photo
Blyth Bridge Over Tarth Water				55°41′32″N 3°23′00″W	Category C(S)	15168	Upload Photo
Entrance Gateway, Lamancha				55°45′19″N 3°16′23″W	Category B	15178	Upload Photo
Halmyle House Halmyne				55°43′59″N 3°18′58″W	Category B	19723	Upload Photo
Bridgend Cottage And Camitswalls				55°42′22″N 3°20′14″W	Category B	15139	Upload Photo
Cowden Lodge At Drive Entrance To Whim House				55°46′01″N 3°15′12″W	Category B	15151	Upload Photo
Lower Grange				55°45′17″N 3°16′56″W	Category C(S)	15175	Upload Photo
Lamancha				55°45′25″N 3°16′38″W	Category B	15176	Upload Photo
Whim House (Now The White House Hotel)				55°46′12″N 3°15′19″W	Category B	15180	Upload Photo
Smithy Cottages, Near Whim				55°45′53″N 3°15′23″W	Category C(S)	13898	Upload Photo
Romanno Post Office And Adjoining Range				55°43′08″N 3°20′14″W	Category B	19722	Upload Photo
Court Of Offices, Whim House				55°46′09″N 3°15′16″W	Category A	19724	Upload Photo
Newlands Manse				55°42′20″N 3°20′10″W	Category B	15136	Upload Photo
Newlands Old Kirk				55°42′19″N 3°20′11″W	Category B	15137	Upload Photo
Newlands Bridge				55°42′22″N 3°20′15″W	Category B	15140	Upload Photo
Cistern, In Policies Of Whim House				55°46′04″N 3°15′14″W	Category C(S)	15150	Upload Photo
Scotstoun House				55°41′40″N 3°21′59″W	Category B	15169	Upload Photo
Ice House, In Policies Of Whim House				55°46′07″N 3°15′16″W	Category B	15181	Upload Photo
Dovecot, Whim House				55°46′05″N 3°15′09″W	Category C(S)	15182	Upload Photo
Old Romanno Bridge Over The Lynne Water				55°43′05″N 3°20′22″W	Category B	15141	Upload Photo
Drochil Castle Farm House				55°40′39″N 3°19′57″W	Category C(S)	15171	Upload Photo
Beresford Burial Vault				55°45′06″N 3°17′29″W	Category C(S)	15174	Upload Photo
Romanno Toll				55°43′06″N 3°20′15″W	Category B	19717	Upload Photo
Stable Square, Scotstoun				55°41′38″N 3°21′55″W	Category C(S)	15170	Upload Photo
Sundial, Lamancha				55°45′25″N 3°16′37″W	Category A	15177	Upload Photo
The Old Mill Inn, Blyth Bridge				55°41′35″N 3°22′57″W	Category B	15167	Upload Photo
Macbiehill Gateway And Lodge				55°45′02″N 3°17′37″W	Category B	15173	Upload Photo
Newlands Parish Church				55°42′24″N 3°20′10″W	Category B	13862	Upload Photo
Mackay Of Scotstoun Tomb In Kirkyard				55°42′18″N 3°20′12″W	Category B	15138	Upload Photo
Drochil Castle				55°40′39″N 3°20′03″W	Category A	13863	Upload Photo

== Key ==
The scheme for classifying buildings in Scotland is:

- Category A: "buildings of national or international importance, either architectural or historic; or fine, little-altered examples of some particular period, style or building type."
- Category B: "buildings of regional or more than local importance; or major examples of some particular period, style or building type, which may have been altered."
- Category C: "buildings of local importance; lesser examples of any period, style, or building type, as originally constructed or moderately altered; and simple traditional buildings which group well with other listed buildings."

In March 2016 there were 47,288 listed buildings in Scotland. Of these, 8% were Category A, and 50% were Category B, with the remaining 42% being Category C.
