= Ettleton =

Village in Scottish Borders, Scotland

Coordinates: 55.16828°N 2.82976°W

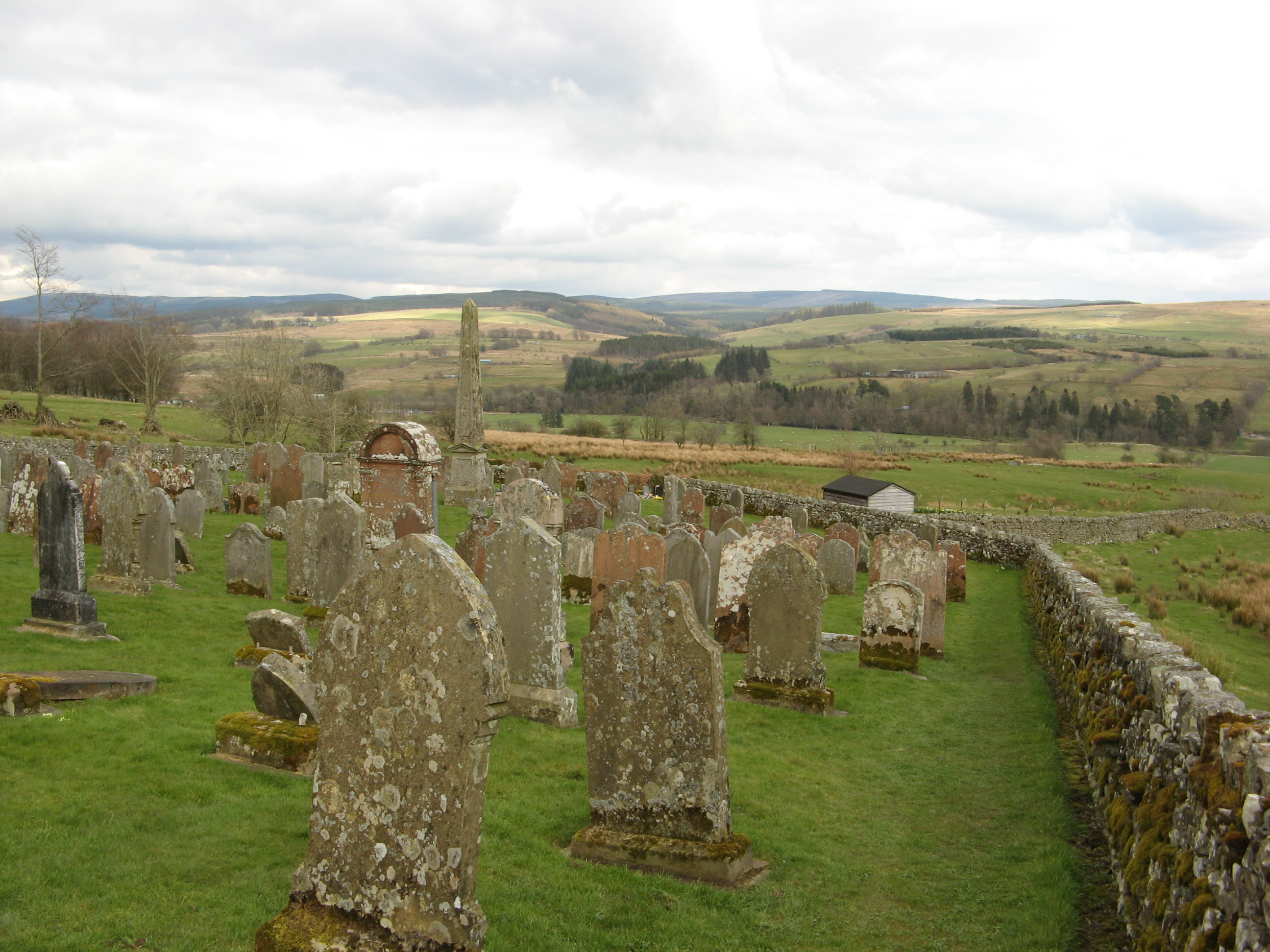
Ettleton churchyard

Ettleton is a village near Castleton, in the Scottish Borders area of Scotland, in the former Roxburghshire.

== Etymology and history ==
Ettleton Parish was once also known as, or contained, Dinwiddie. The first element of this name appears to be the Cumbric word din, meaning 'fort'. Ettleton Cemetery, on the slopes of Ettleton Sike, is the burial place of many members of Clan Armstrong. Other places nearby include Newcastleton.

== See also ==
- List of places in the Scottish Borders
- List of places in Scotland
