= John Armstrong (poet) =

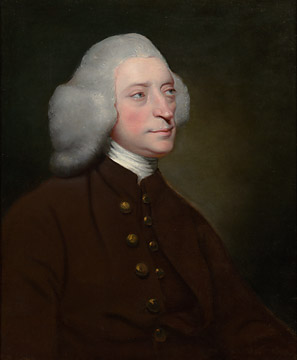
- Dr. John Armstrong by Sir Joshua Reynolds (c. 1767), courtesy Figge Art Museum, Davenport, USA
- Born: 1709
- Died: 1779 (aged 69–70)
- Occupations: poet, physician
- Notable work: The Art of Preserving Health (1744)

Dr. John Armstrong (1709–1779) was a physician, poet, and satirist. He was born at Castleton Manse, the son of Robert Armstrong, minister of Castleton, Roxburghshire, Scotland John studied medicine and gained his MD at the renowned University of Edinburgh (being the first to graduate 'with distinction' in 1732) before establishing a successful medical practice in London.

John Armstrong is remembered as the friend of James Thomson, David Mallet, and other literary celebrities of the time, and as the author of a poem on The Art of Preserving Health, which appeared in 1744, and in which a somewhat unpromising subject for poetic treatment is gracefully and ingeniously handled. His other works, consisting of some poems and prose essays, and a drama, The Forced Marriage, are forgotten, with the exception of "The Oeconomy of Love" and the four stanzas at the end of the first part of Thomson's Castle of Indolence, describing the diseases incident to sloth, which he contributed. Under the pseudonym "Launcelot Temple, Esq", he published Sketches, or, Essays on Various Subjects in 1758.

The "Oeconomy Of Love" has been described as an eighteenth-century guide to sex and is particularly interesting in that the lines:

"To shed thy blossoms thro' the desert air, And sow thy perish'd offspring in the winds" are thought to be a possible inspiration for the more famous lines by Thomas Gray contained in his "Elegy Written in a Country Church-Yard" as follows:

"Full many a flower is born to blush unseen, And waste its sweetness on the desert air."

However John Armstrong's use of floral metaphor in the "Oeconomy of Love" refers to the unnecessary shedding of semen whilst the author cautions young men against sexual practices that he condemns in his role as poet and physician.

Strangely what must have been once the small town of Castleton, with a castle, church, manse, regular licensed markets and many homes has now totally disappeared. In the churchyard, however an obelisk stands to the memory of John Armstrong. It reads:

          "If yet thy shade delights to hover near
           The holy ground where oft thy sire hath taught,
           And where our fathers fondly flocked to hear
           Accept the offering which their sons have brought.
           
           Proud of the muse, which gave to classic fame
           Our vale and stream, to song before unknown;
           We raise this stone to bear thy deathless name,
           And tell the world that Armstrong was our own.

           To learning, worth, and genius such as thine,
          How vain the tribute monuments can pay!
          Thy name immortal with thy works shall shine,
          And live when frailer marble shall decay."

Of considerable note, also written on the same stone, in this deserted churchyard of a town or village of which nothing else remains, lies the further inscription:

       "In Memory of George Armstrong, M.D.,1720-1789, Brother of John the Poet.
        Doctor George Armstrong is the Father of modern Paediatrics, 
        and the Founder of the World's First Hospital for Sick Children.
        He died in London where he had given his life for the children of the poor"
