= Kershopefoot =

Hamlet in Cumbria, England

Coordinates: 55.13737°N 2.82121°W

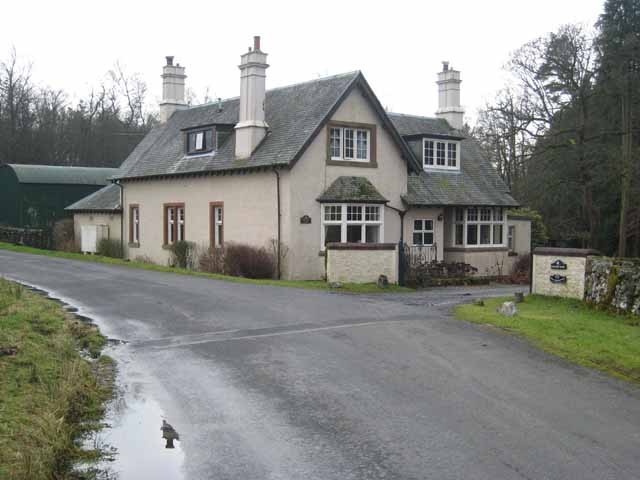
- The most substantial properties associated with the hamlet are Kershope House and its lodge.

- Location in the former Carlisle district, Cumbria Location within Cumbria
- Language: English; Cumbrian dialect(with some influence from over the border)
- OS grid reference: NY477828
- Civil parish: Nicholforest
- Unitary authority: Cumberland
- Ceremonial county: Cumbria
- Region: North West
- Country: England
- Sovereign state: United Kingdom
- Post town: NEWCASTLETON
- Postcode district: TD9
- Dialling code: 013873
- Police: Cumbria
- Fire: Cumbria
- Ambulance: North West
- UK Parliament: Carlisle

Kershopefoot is a small hamlet in Cumbria, England, traditionally in Cumberland. It is located very close to the Scotland-England border and is near the Kershope Burn and the Liddel Water. Kershopefoot is most well known for its lodge house (Kershope Lodge) situated almost a mile from the hamlet. Between 1862 and 1969 a passenger station on the Waverley Line variously known as Kershope or Kershope Foot was located here.
