= Kershope Burn =

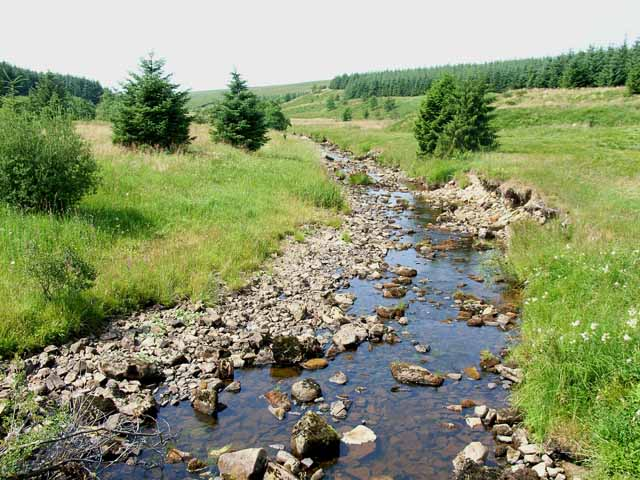
- The burn near Scotch Kershope

- Location within Cumbria

Location
- Country: United Kingdom
- Part: England, Scotland

Physical characteristics
- Mouth
  - location: Liddel Water
  - coordinates: 55.138069°N 2.823846°W

Kershope Burn is a burn running in its entirety along the border between England and Scotland.

The river rises, as Clark's Sike, in a marshy area in Kielder Forest Northumberland known as Hobb's Flow, before becoming Kershope Burn after running by Kershopehead, a farmstead in Cumbria.

The river runs into Liddel Water at Kershopefoot, after which Liddel Water marks the boundary between England and Scotland. The final few metres (yards) of the river flow past the hamlet at Kershopefoot and underneath the railway bridge of the former Waverley Line. Between 1862 and 1969 a passenger station variously known as Kershope or Kershope Foot was located here.
