= Saughtree railway station =

Former railway station in Scotland

Coordinates: 55.2748°N 2.6869°W

Saughtree
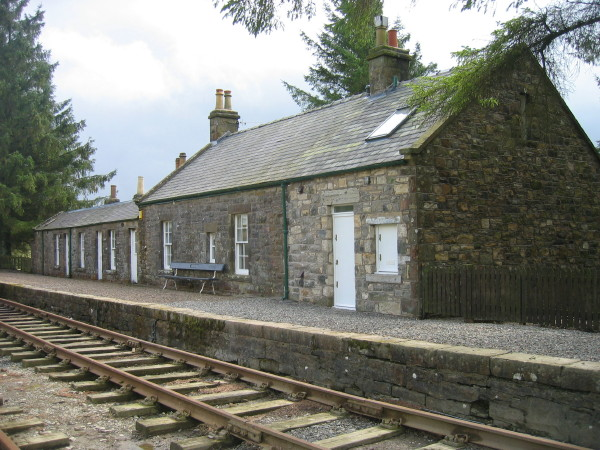

General information
- Location: Saughtree, Roxburghshire; Scotland
- Grid reference: NY564981
- Platforms: 1

Other information
- Status: Disused

History
- Original company: Border Counties Railway
- Pre-grouping: North British Railway
- Post-grouping: London and North Eastern Railway; North Eastern Region of British Railways

Key dates
- 1862: Station opened
- 1 December 1944: Station closed to passengers
- 23 August 1948: Station reopens to passengers
- 15 October 1956: Station closed to passengers
- 1 September 1958: Station closed to freight
Location

Border Counties Railway

Overview
- Status: Closed
- Locale: Roxburghshire, Scotland; Northumberland, England

Service
- Type: Heavy rail

History
- Commenced: 11 December 1855
- Opened: 2 April 1858
- Completed: 24 June 1862
- Merged into: North British Railway - 1860
- Merged into: London North Eastern Railway - 1923
- Merged into: British Railways - 1948
- Closed: 1 September 1958; (except Reedsmouth–Bellingham, closed 11 November 1963)

Technical
- Track gauge: 4 ft 8 1/2 in (1,435 mm)

Saughtree railway station is a closed railway station situated a mile north of the hamlet of Saughtree and two miles from the border with England.

== History ==
Saughtree railway station was on the Border Counties Railway which linked the Newcastle and Carlisle Railway, near Hexham, with the Border Union Railway at Riccarton Junction. The first section of the route was opened between Hexham and Chollerford in 1858, the remainder opening in 1862. Services to the station were never frequent, due to its remote location (the nearest settlement being a mile distant) – only a single train each way was timetabled to call on Mondays, Thursdays & Saturdays, to allow the handful of regular passengers to travel to Hawick to shop. The service was suspended altogether on 1 December 1944 as a wartime economy measure, eventually being reinstated in August 1948.

The line was closed to passengers by British Railways in October 1956 and completely two years later. The station had a single platform, a stone-built station building, and a siding.

The station building and platform have been restored and 400 yards of new track laid.

Former Services

Preceding station	Disused railways	Following station
Riccarton Junction	London and North Eastern Railway; Border Counties Railway	Deadwater
