= Bordlands =

Village in Scottish Borders, Scotland

Coordinates: 55.7064°N 3.3463°W

Bordlands is a village in the Parish of Newlands in the Scottish Borders area of Scotland. In is recorded on Pont's maps as Boirland.

Bordlands Hill, to the south of the village, is the site of a prehistoric hillfort which is designated as a scheduled monument.

== See also ==
- List of places in the Scottish Borders
- List of places in Scotland
