= Robert Aytoun =

Scottish writer

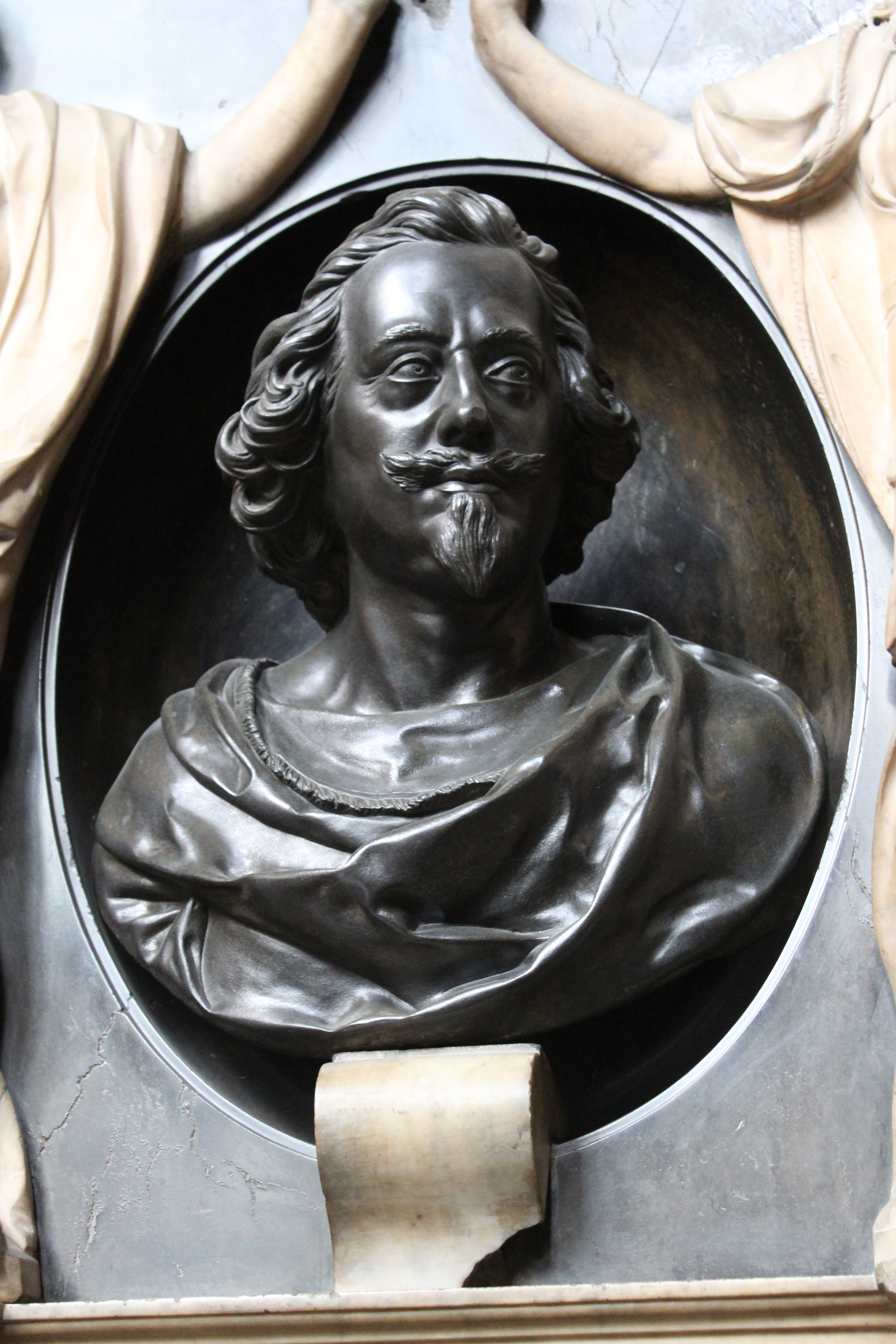
- Born: c. 1570
- Died: 1638 (aged 67–68)
- Resting place: Westminster Abbey
- Education: University of St Andrews
- Occupations: lawyer, poet
- Notable work: Diophantus and Charidora

Sir Robert Aytoun or Ayton (c. 1570–1638) was a Scottish multilingual poet and juris.

== Biography ==
Aytoun was the son of Andrew Ayton of Kinaldie Castle, in Fife, Scotland, and Mary Lundie.

Aytoun and his elder brother John entered St Leonard's College in St Andrews in 1584. After graduating MA from St Andrews in 1588, he studied civil law at Paris.

He appears to have been well known to his literary contemporaries in Scotland and England. He became a groom in the privy chamber of King James in succession to Laurence Marbury, was knighted, and became a gentleman of the bedchamber in 1612. He became secretary and master of requests to Anne of Denmark in succession to another Scottish poet, William Fowler. He was sent as ambassador to Rudolf II, Holy Roman Emperor in 1609. He was later secretary to Henrietta Maria.

He wrote poems in Latin, French, Greek, and English, and was one of the first Scots to write in standard English. His major work was Diophantus and Charidora.

Inconstancy Upbraided is perhaps the best of his short poems. He is credited with a little poem, Old Long Syne, which probably suggested Robert Burns's famous Auld Lang Syne.

Aytoun died at Whitehall Palace and is buried in the south ambulatory area of Westminster Abbey. The monument includes a bronze bust, attributed, variously, to either Hubert Le Sueur or Francesco Fanelli. Amongst his bequests, Aytoun gave a diamond hatband to William Murray and his French bed to Jane Whorwood.

== Bothwell and Little Jock Elliot ==
He is also the author of a ballad called "Bothwell" about the battle fought by James Hepburn, 4th Earl of Bothwell with the border reiver, John Elliot of Park, also known as Little Jock Elliot or Little Jock of the Park. The ballad recounts how Bothwell, in attempting to arrest Little Jock Elliot, suffers life-threatening wounds, though he ends by slaying his foe. Ayton was eight years old at the time Bothwell perished in a dungeon in Denmark, and hence must have heard about the attempted arrest of Elliot by people familiar with the story, particularly as Bothwell was a figure of national renown.

The Border ballad "Little Jock Elliot" celebrates, amongst other events, the achievements of Little Jock Elliot on this occasion and has the refrain "My name is little Jock Elliot, and wha daur meddle wi' me!". This latter ballad, of indeterminate date, also implicitly states that Little Jock Elliot survived the encounter with Bothwell.
