= Rock UK =

United Kingdom Christian charity

- Formation: 1922; 104 years ago
- Registration no.: 1107724
- Headquarters: Irthlingborough, Northamptonshire
- Location: United Kingdom
- Website: www.rockuk.org
- Formerly called: Barnabas Adventure Centres

Rock UK (formerly Barnabas Adventure Centres) is a national UK Christian charity that provides outdoor residential stays and day visit for groups including primary and secondary schools, colleges, youth groups, uniformed groups, Christian retreats as well as families, individuals and corporate team building.

== Locations ==
Rock UK runs four Outdoor Activity Centres around the country, including:

- Carroty Wood - A 58-acre (230,000 m^{2}) site set in mature woodlands (Tonbridge, Kent)
- Frontier Centre - A 120-acre (0.49 km^{2}) site in the heart of England (Irthlingborough, Northants)
- Whithaugh Park - Set in 110 acres (0.45 km^{2}) among the hills of Scotland's Border Country (Newcastleton, Scottish Borders)
- Summit Centre - formerly known as the Welsh International Climbing Centre, set in the Welsh Valleys (Treharris, South Wales)

== History ==
Rock UK began its life in 1922 when a group of Sunday school teachers from London decided to take their groups on an adventure holiday. The groups purchased Belgrave House in Littlehampton so that they could return regularly and in 1924 also decided to rent a field at Climping, which was used as a canvas campsite. Camps continued to be run at both of these locations for 50 years under the name of the 'Belgrave Trust'.

In 1977, Belgrave House was sold in order to expand the work, with the proceeds being used to buy Carroty Wood in Tonbridge which was turned into an outdoor pursuits centre. In the following years, Halls Green (now closed), Whithaugh Park and the Frontier Centre were also purchased. The Belgrave Trust underwent a number of name changes before finally becoming known as Barnabas Adventure Centres. In 2009, the organisation was renamed "Rock UK". In October 2010 Rock UK opened Summit Centre is South Wales.

Summit Centre has had a £4m investment, completed in Spring 2018 to redevelop the activity centre. The centre was officially opened in February 2019 with a visit from HRH the Prince of Wales.

== Affiliations and links ==
Each of the activity centres are licensed by the Adventure Activities Licensing Authority (AALA) and hold the Learning Outside the Classroom (LOtC) Quality Badge

The organisation is a member of the Evangelical Alliance

Rock UK also has strong links with the Northamptonshire Association of Youth Groups (NAYC) having taken over the running of the Frontier Centre from NAYC in 2004. Rock UK is also a member of Christian Camping International (CCI).
