= Plender =

Plender is a surname. Notable people with the surname include:

- John Plender, British financial journalist
- Olivia Plender (born 1977), British artist
- William Plender, 1st Baron Plender (1861–1946), British chartered accountant and public servant

== See also ==
- Plender Street Market
- Plenderleith, surname
