= Nicholas II de Soules =

Scottish Border noble

Coat of arms of Lord of Liddesdale

Nicholas de Soules (d. c.1296), Lord of Liddesdale and Butler of Scotland, was a 13th-century Scottish Border noble.

Nicholas was the son of William de Soules and Ermengarde, daughter of Alan Durward and Marjorie of Scotland, and elder brother of John de Soules, Guardian of Scotland. He succeeded to his father's estates and titles upon the death of his father.

Upon the death of the Margaret, Maid of Norway in 1290, Nicholas became one of the competitors for the Crown of Scotland, deriving his claim from his grandmother Marjorie, an illegitimate daughter of King Alexander II of Scotland.

He performed homage on 27 July 1296 to King Edward I of England at Elgin and on 28 August at Berwick-upon-Tweed.

== Family and issue ==
Nicholas married Margaret Comyn, daughter of Alexander Comyn, Earl of Buchan and Elizabeth de Quincy. They are known to have had the following issue:

- William (died 1321)
- John, Sheriff of Berwick, married Margaret, widow of Hugh de Perisby, and daughter of Merleswain, Lord of Ardross. Had issue.

== Notes ==
Preceded by William I de Soules	Lord of Liddesdale ?–?	Succeeded by William II de Soules
