= Lord of Liddesdale =

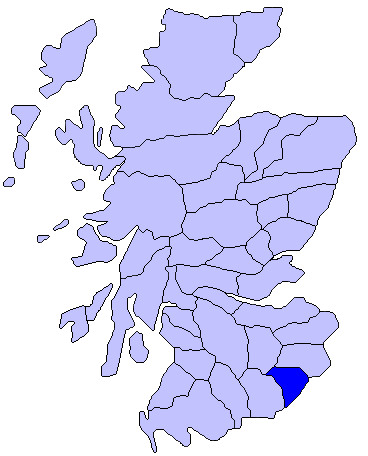
Extent of Lordship of Liddesdale

Coat of arms of de Soulis, Lords of Liddesdale

The Lord of Liddesdale was a magnate in the medieval Kingdom of Scotland; the territorial lordship of Liddesdale was first created by David I of Scotland, perhaps between 1113 and 1124 when the latter was Prince of the Cumbrians. From an early period the caput of the lordship was Hermitage Castle, the strength of Liddesdale. King David gave the territory to Ranulf de Soules, a knight from the Cotentin Peninsula. It was forfeited by the Soulis (de Soules) family in the 14th century and eventually passed to the Douglases, only to be lost to the Hepburns by order of James IV. Archibald Douglas, 5th Earl of Angus was remunerated for this loss by the lordship of Bothwell Castle, although the Hepburn Earls of Bothwell retained the territorial designation

- Ranulf I de Soules († x 1170)
- Ranulf II de Soules († 1207)
- Fulk de Soules († x 1227)
- Nicholas I de Soules († x 1264)
- William I de Soules († 1292x3)
- Nicholas II de Soules († 1296)
- William II de Soules († 1320x1), forfeit
- Sir Robert Bruce (illegitimate son of Robert I), († 1332)
- Sir Archibald Douglas, († 1333)
- William Douglas, 1st Earl of Douglas (loses 1342; † 1384)
- Sir William Douglas of Lothian, († 1353)
- George Douglas, 1st Earl of Angus, († 1403)
  - Sir James Douglas of Dalkeith († 1420), held lordship until 1397;
- Crown wardship: 1403-09x
- William Douglas, 2nd Earl of Angus, († 1437)
- James Douglas, 3rd Earl of Angus, († 1446)
- George Douglas, 4th Earl of Angus, († 1463)
- Archibald Douglas, 5th Earl of Angus, (forfeit 1491; † 1513)
- Patrick Hepburn, 1st Earl of Bothwell, († 1508)
- Adam Hepburn, 2nd Earl of Bothwell, († 1513)
- Patrick Hepburn, 3rd Earl of Bothwell, († 1556)
- annexed to the crown in 1540
