= Dinley =

Village in Scottish Borders, Scotland

Coordinates: 55°15′27″N 2°49′22″W

Dinley is a hamlet in the Scottish Borders through which Hermitage Water flows.

== Etymology ==
The first element, din, seems to be the Cumbric word for a fort.
