= Penton railway station =

Disused railway station in Penton, Dumfriesshire

Penton

General information
- Location: Penton, Dumfriesshire; Scotland
- Platforms: 2

Other information
- Status: Disused

History
- Original company: Border Union Railway
- Pre-grouping: North British Railway
- Post-grouping: LNER; British Rail (Scottish Region)

Key dates
- 1 March 1862: Opened
- 6 January 1969: Closed
Location

Penton railway station served the parish of Penton from 1862 to 1969 on the Border Union Railway.

== History ==
The station opened on 1 March 1862 by the Border Union Railway. It was situated on the west side of an unnamed minor road at the end of a short approach road. There was no footbridge; passengers had to use a barrow crossing at the north end of the platforms to get to the other platform. In the early days there was a coal siding to the south, whilst there was a private siding for Kingfield House to the north. The goods yard had two long sidings and a loop siding which served a cattle dock. The goods yard closed on 9 October 1967. The station closed to passengers and goods traffic on 6 January 1969.

Preceding station	Disused railways	Following station
Nook Pasture; Line and station closed	North British Railway; Border Union Railway	Riddings Junction; Line and station closed
