= Nook Pasture railway station =

Disused railway station

Nook Pasture

General information
- Location: Cumbria; England
- Coordinates: 55.103264°N 2.867533°W
- Grid reference: NY448791
- Platforms: 2

Other information
- Status: Disused

History
- Original company: Border Union Railway

Key dates
- 2 January 1864: Opened
- December 1873: Closed
Location

Nook Pasture railway station served the village of Canonbie, Dumfriesshire, Scotland, from 1864 to 1873 on the Waverley Line. The station was located across the Scottish border in Cumbria.

== History ==
The station opened on 2 January 1864 by the Border Union Railway. A public footpath that ran west from Nook Farm crossed the track. The station had no buildings or goods facilities. The station was presumed to have opened for John Forster, who had a large shareholding in the Border Union Railway. It closed in 1873, when he was presumed to have ceased to be a shareholder.

Preceding station	Disused railways	Following station
Kershope Foot; Line and station closed	Border Union Railway; Waverley Line	Penton; Line and station closed
