= Little Jock Elliot =

Border ballad

Little Jock Elliot is Border ballad of indeterminate age. It is sometimes referred to as the "lost ballad" since the only certain remaining of it is the famous verse "Wha daur meddle wi me ?". A version of it was written by James Smail (1828–1905) under the pseudonym of Matthew Gotterson in The Scotsman, in 1872. He gave it a second part in 1892.

== Synopsis ==
John Elliot of Park was a famous Scottish border reiver and infamous plunderer and cattle 'lifter' from the powerful Elliot family along the lawless Scottish border with England in the mid 16th Century. He is also the subject of a well-known Border ballad called "Little Jock Elliot".

The ballad asserts Elliot's prowess in battle and contains the famous refrain "My name is Little Jock Elliot, and wha daur meddle wi' me!," which has traditionally been offered as one possible source for the origins of the Latin motto of the Order of the Thistle, "Nemo me impune lacessit".

The ballad ends by referencing Little Jock Elliot's wounding of James Hepburn, 4th Earl of Bothwell in the summer of 1566 when the latter attempted to arrest Elliot, apparently for crimes committed as a reiver. Another ballad called "Bothwell", attributed to the early Scottish poet Robert Aytoun, presents the story from the point of view of Bothwell. The ballad 'Bothwell' states that the earl, though suffering from life-threatening wounds inflicted by Elliot, yet managed to kill him, thus reversing the heroic role assigned to Little Jock Elliot in the eponymous ballad and also its implicit message that Elliot survived the encounter.

== History ==
The events occurred in fact, evidently with both Elliot and Bothwell at least wounding each other. The various accounts agree that Bothwell wounded Elliot first, who notwithstanding his wounds, managed to wound Bothwell in return to such a degree that he was near death and unable to continue the fight. This wounding of Bothwell apparently also led to Mary, Queen of Scots life being endangered. On her way to see Bothwell, she almost perished in a mire, and subsequent to her strenuous ride (fifty miles in a single day), she became extremely ill, apparently with pneumonia.

The wounding of Bothwell by John Elliot of Park is mentioned in the Scottish chronicle called the Diurnal of Occurrents. In this account, Elliot was captured and then shot by Bothwell outside Hermitage Castle as he tried to escape. Elliot, according to the Diurnal, died of his wounds on 7 October 1566. An English border warden wrote that Bothwell had shot him "through the thigh with a dag". According to the diary of Robert Birrel, Elliot's head was sent to Edinburgh.

A poem by Sir Richard Maitland mentions Elliot as a Liddesdale reiver. George Buchanan, perhaps to shame Bothwell, mentions in his Detectio only that he was wounded by a nameless thief.

In September 1569, a John Elliot of Park signed a pledge for good behaviour with Regent Moray on behalf of himself and the whole Park branch of the family.
