= Butler of Scotland =

The office of Butler of Scotland (Latin: Pincerna Regis), was a court position in the Kingdom of Scotland during the High Middle Ages.

== Office holders ==
- Ranulf I de Soules
- William II de Haya
- Nicholas I de Soules
- William I de Soules
- Nicholas II de Soules
- William II de Soules
