= William II de Soules =

Scottish Border noble

Coat of arms of Lord of Liddesdale

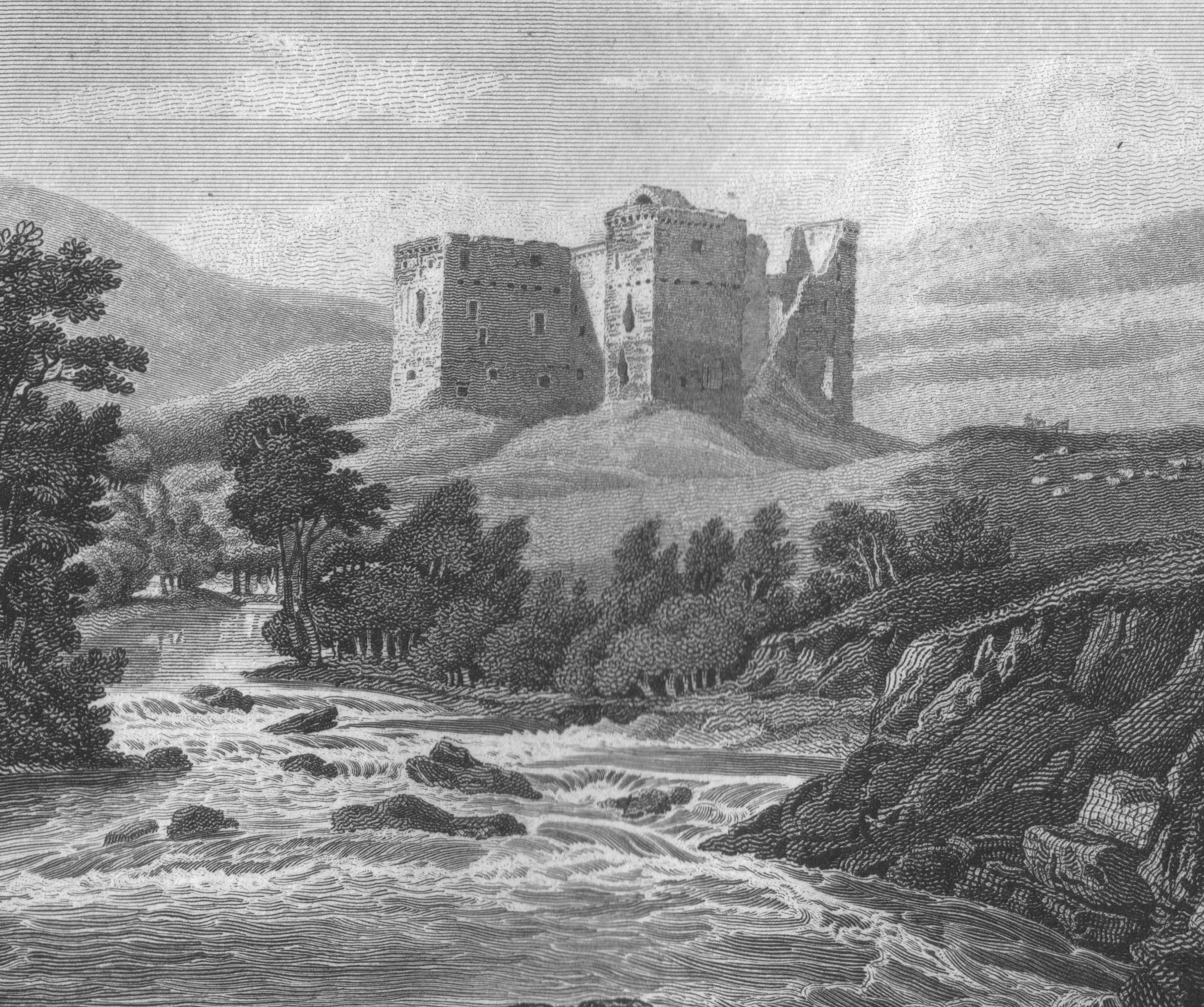
Hermitage Castle (in 1814), caput of the small provincial lordship of Liddesdale.

William II de Soules (d. 1320/1321), Lord of Liddesdale and Butler of Scotland, was a Scottish Border noble during the Wars of Scottish Independence. William was the elder son of Nicholas II de Soules, Lord of Liddesdale and Butler of Scotland, and a cousin of Alexander Comyn, Earl of Buchan. He was the nephew of John de Soules, Guardian of Scotland.

While still a young man, he was received into the peace of King Edward I of England in 1304. He remained in English service in the following decade, and received reward in 1312 with a knighthood and the lands of Sir Robert Keith although by that time those were in the hands of the Scots. After the victory of the Bruce cause at the Battle of Bannockburn in 1314, he switched to the Scottish side. By 1318 he was Butler of Scotland, and in 1320 he appeared as a signatory to the Declaration of Arbroath with this designation.

Later in 1320 he was involved in a conspiracy against King Robert along with Sir David, Lord of Brechin. Some say that he wanted the Scottish throne for himself, others, that the probable aim was to place Edward Balliol on the Scottish throne. Soules had gathered a few followers when he was arrested at Berwick. He was brought before a specially convened session of parliament at Scone on 4 August 1320. There he confessed his treason. The Black Parliament found him guilty, he forfeited his title, and was sentenced to life imprisonment. William was incarcerated in Dumbarton Castle. His conspirators fared much worse: they were executed by being drawn behind horses, hanged, and beheaded. William is said to have died by 20 April 1321, in mysterious circumstances. William was the last of the de Soules family to hold the title Lord of Liddesdale, it was bestowed upon Sir Robert Bruce, the illegitimate son of King Robert the Bruce.

Another William de Soules, about two generations earlier, had married Ermengarde, daughter of Alan Durward by Marjorie, illegitimate daughter of Alexander II of Scotland. A son, Nicholas de Soulis, was one of the Competitors for the Crown of Scotland.

== In folklore ==
Scottish Borders folklore maintains that a Soulis was involved with the black arts being schooled with Michael Scot, the "wizard of the North". Sir Walter Scott made this Lord Soules - Sir William and gave him a familiar called Robin Redcap in his work Minstrelsy of the Scottish Border. In retaliation for a long history of cruelty, locals boiled this Lord Soules alive at Ninestane Rig. The more likely culprit would have been Sir Ranulf (Randolph) de Soules of Liddel (born c.1150 and murdered by his servants in 1207/8)

Soulis is also said to have defeated the Northumbrian giant, The Cout o' Keilder. The giant wore an enchanted armour that was impervious to any weapon but the wizard tricked the giant by knocking him into a river where he drowned. The water is known as the "drowning pool" today. There is a large burial mound near Hermitage Castle said to be the final resting place of the Cout.

== Citations ==
Preceded by Nicholas II de Soules	Lord of Liddesdale; 1318–1320	Succeeded by Forfeit; Given to: Robert Bruce, illegitimate son of Robert I
