= Kershope Foot railway station =

Disused railway station in Kershopefoot, Cumbria

Kershope Foot
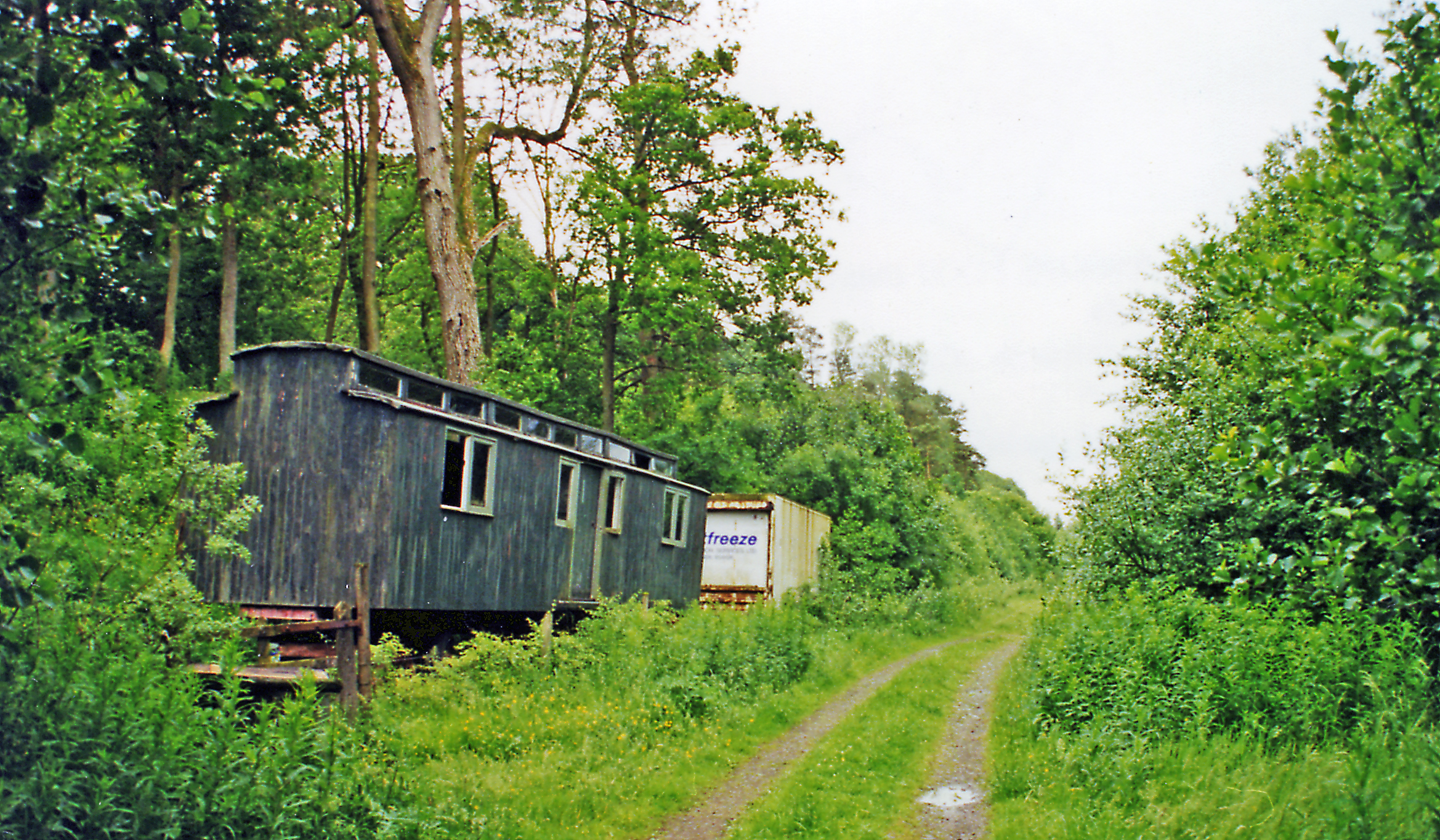
- The site of the station, looking south towards Carlisle, in 2000

General information
- Location: Kershopefoot, Cumbria; England
- Coordinates: 55.1375°N 2.825°W
- Grid reference: NY475828
- Platforms: 2

Other information
- Status: Disused

History
- Original company: Border Union Railway
- Pre-grouping: North British Railway
- Post-grouping: LNER; British Rail (Scottish Region)

Key dates
- 1 March 1862: Opened
- 6 January 1969: Closed
Location

Kershope Foot railway station served the hamlet of Kershopefoot, Cumbria, from 1862 to 1969 on the Border Union Railway.

== History ==
The station opened on 1 March 1862 by the Border Union Railway. It was situated on the south side of an unnamed minor road. The station was originally called Kershope but it was later called Kershope Foot. The station sign spelled it as a single word. The goods yard was composed of two sidings, one of them running a short distance behind the down platform. The goods yard closed on 28 December 1964. On 27 March 1967 the station was downgraded to an unstaffed halt, although the suffix 'halt' never appeared on any tickets or signs or in any timetables. The station was closed to both passengers and goods traffic on 6 January 1969.

Preceding station	Disused railways	Following station
Newcastleton; Line and station closed	North British Railway; Border Union Railway	Nook Pasture; Line and station closed
