= Robert Bruce, Lord of Liddesdale =

Bastard son of Robert the Bruce (c. 1293–1332)

Robert Bruce
- Lord of Liddesdale
- Born: c. 1293
- Died: 11 August 1332 (aged approximately 39); Battle of Dupplin Moor
- Buried: Holmcultram Abbey
- Noble family: Clan Bruce
- Father: Robert the Bruce

Sir Robert Bruce, Lord of Liddesdale (c. 1293 - 11 August 1332) was the illegitimate son of King Robert the Bruce and an unknown mother. He was knighted and awarded the royal arms at the Battle of Bannockburn in 1314. The youngest a man could be knighted was 21, meaning 1293 is the latest he could have been born.

== Biography ==
His father made him Lord of Liddesdale after William II de Soules was found guilty of treason and forfeited the title on 4 August 1320, at the Black Parliament at Scone. It has been suggested that he may have been the father of Thomas Bruce, 1st Baron of Clackmannan, but there is no clear evidence for this.

Faced with Edward Balliol's invasion of Scotland during the reign of his half-brother David II, Robert and Duncan IV, Earl of Fife, attempted to prevent Balliol's forces from landing at Kinghorn in Fife on 6 August 1332. The unsuccessful attempt resulted in the Battle of Wester Kinghorn. Scottish losses were high and included five or six nobles, including Sir Alexander Seton. Balliol's forces then marched on Dunfermline, where they looted a Scottish armory.

Five days later the Scots, their forces greatly strengthened, again met Balliol's English forces at the Battle of Dupplin Moor. The day before the battle Donald II, Earl of Mar, newly appointed Guardian of Scotland, corresponded with Balliol, he wanted them to surrender so that they could be ransomed back to England. He was so confident of victory he failed to set proper watches and under cover of night the English forces crossed the River Earn.

Lord Robert Bruce was in command of the leading schiltron of the Scottish army. On the morning of 11 August 1332, seeing the unopposed progress of the English forces, and knowing of Mar's correspondence with Balliol, Bruce publicly accused Mar of incompetence and treachery. Mar declared he would prove his loyalty to Scotland by being the first to strike a blow against the English. Bruce claimed this honour for himself, and immediately led his schiltron against the opposing forces. Mar's phalanx followed closely on their heels.

Bruce's headlong charge struck with such force they drove the English infantry back nearly 10 yards (9 m). Now only 800 strong, Bruce's men found themselves compressed from behind by Mar's charging forces. Surrounded on all sides, the Scots had little room to move, although they put up a valiant fight they were picked off by English longbowmen. The battle raged until sunset, in the end Bruce and Mar died on the battlefield; as did many others. Estimates of the Scottish dead range from 2000 to 15,000 men. Accounts of the aftermath describe great heaps of Scottish dead, some taller than a spear's length.

Bruce's body was recovered and buried at Holmcultram Abbey, near that of his grandfather, Robert de Brus, 6th Lord of Annandale.
