= Plenderleith =

Plenderleith is a surname. Notable people with the surname include:

- Bill Plenderleith (1929–2009), British-Kenyan field hockey player
- Harold Plenderleith (1898–1997), Scottish art conservator
- Ian Plenderleith (born 1943), British central banker
- Jackie Plenderleith (born 1937), Scottish footballer
- Robert Waldron Plenderleith (1901–1974), Scottish engineer and curator

== See also ==
- Baron of Plenderleith, Scottish title of nobility
- Plender, surname
- William Plenderleath (1831–1906), English Anglican clergyman, author and antiquarian
