= Carwinley =

Hamlet in Cumbria, England

Coordinates: 55.046°N 2.932°W

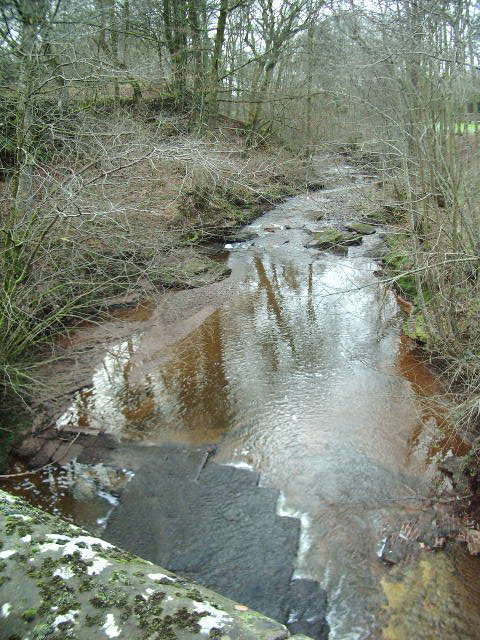
- Carwinley Burn

- Location in the former Carlisle district, Cumbria Location within Cumbria
- OS grid reference: NY404727
- Civil parish: Arthuret
- Unitary authority: Cumberland
- Ceremonial county: Cumbria
- Region: North West
- Country: England
- Sovereign state: United Kingdom
- Post town: CARLISLE
- Postcode district: CA6
- Dialling code: 01228
- Police: Cumbria
- Fire: Cumbria
- Ambulance: North West
- UK Parliament: Carlisle

Carwinley is a hamlet in Cumbria, England, located on the border with Scotland. It was first mentioned in 1202 as Karwindelhov.

The ancient monument of Liddel Strength is about 1 km north of the settlement.
