= Liddel Water =

River in England and Scotland

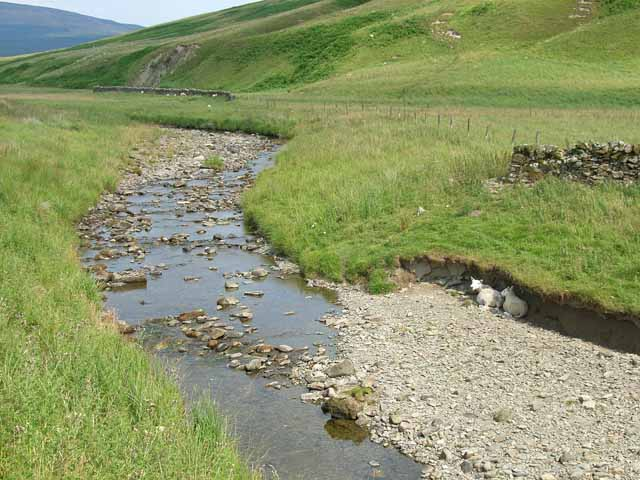
- Upper reaches of Liddel Water
- Native name: Liddel Watter (Scots)

Location
- Country: United Kingdom
- Constituent countries: Scotland, England

Physical characteristics
- Source: Peel Fell (Scottish side)
  - location: near Saughtree, Scottish Borders, Scotland
  - coordinates: 55.288185°N 2.591997°W
- Source confluence: River Esk
  - location: Carwinley, Cumbria, England
  - coordinates: 55.043427°N 2.932672°W

Liddel Water is a river running through southern Scotland and northern England, for much of its course forming the border between the two countries, and was formerly one of the boundaries of the Debatable Lands.

Liddel Water's source is beneath Peel Fell in Roxburghshire, in the Scottish Borders, where it is formed by the confluence of Caddroun Burn, Wormscleuch Burn and Peel Burn (burn is the Scots term for a stream). Soon afterwards, the nascent Liddel Water is fed by Dawston Burn near the village of Saughtree.

The river continues to pick up tributaries (listed below) as it follows its southwesterly course, which takes it through the village of Newcastleton (also known as Copshaw Holm) to that of Kershopefoot, where the burn begins to mark the Anglo-Scottish border.

Liddel Water then flows into the River Esk at Willow Pool, overlooked by the earthworks of the former castle of Liddel Strength near Carwinley, Cumbria.

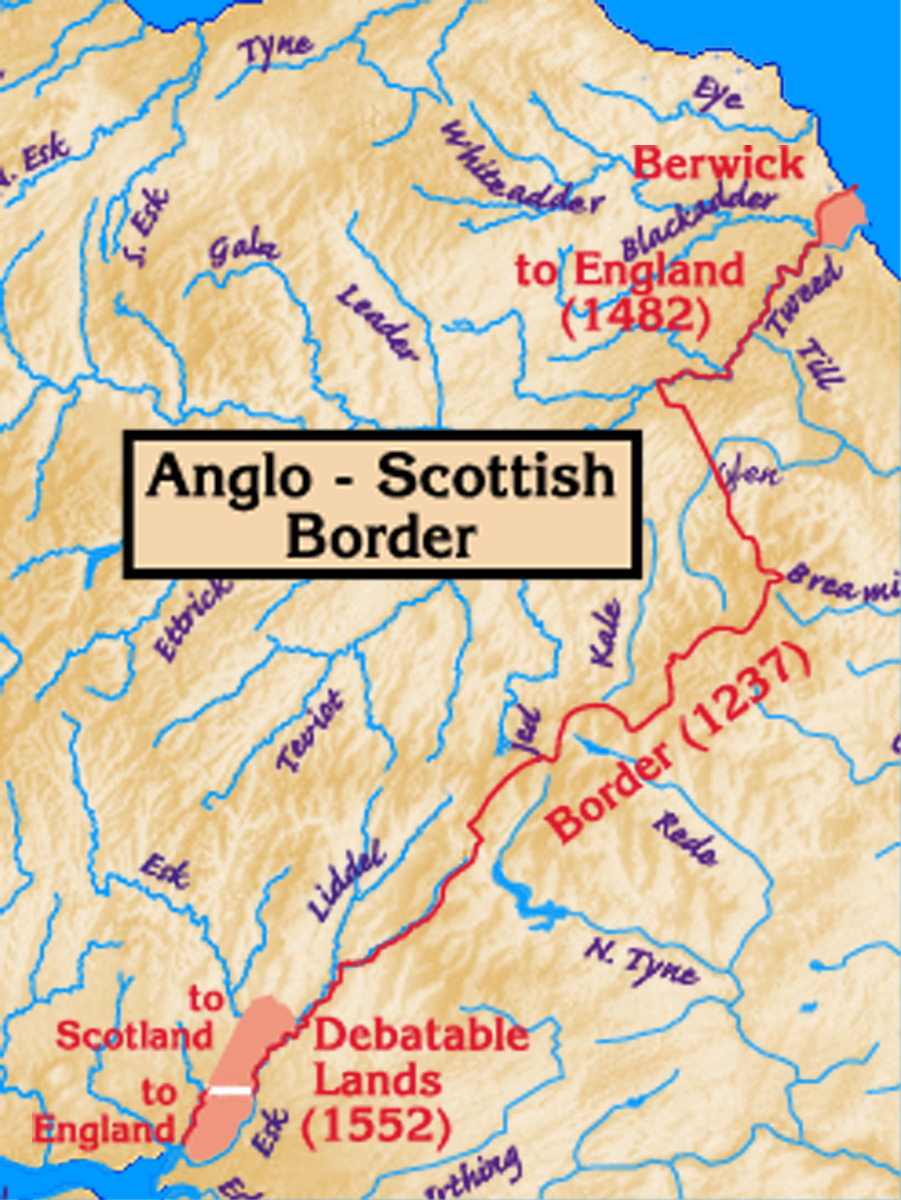
Scottish border

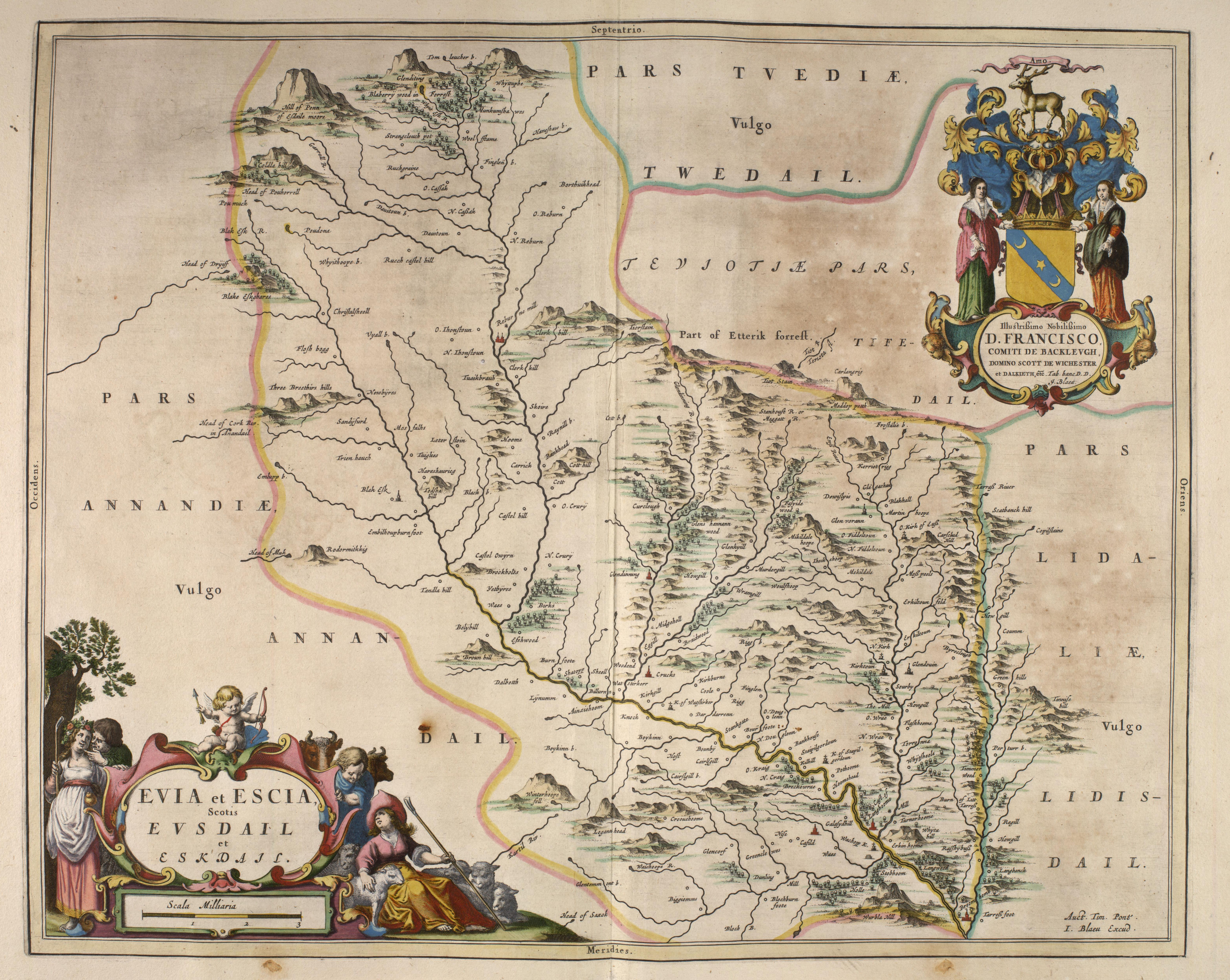
Blaeu - Atlas of Scotland 1654

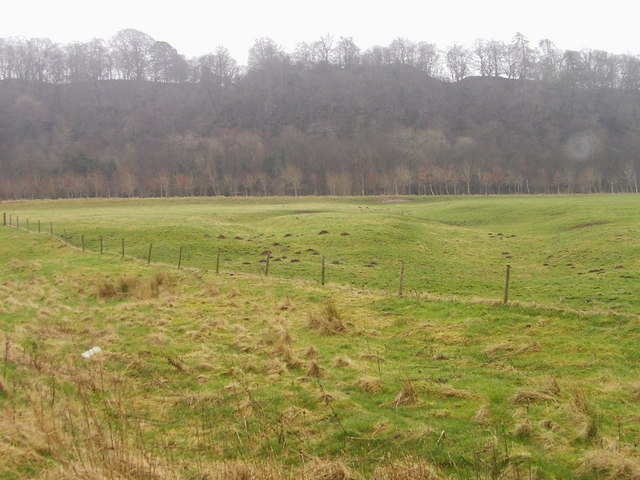
Liddel Strength. Site of a Norman motte and bailey castle

== Tributaries ==
- Peel Burn
- Wormscleuch Burn
- Caddroun Burn
  - Wane Cleuch
  - Singdean Burn
- Dawston Burn
  - Cooper Cleuch
  - Alison Sike
  - Cliffhope Burn
- Kiln Burn (at Burnmouth Farm)
- Riccarton Burn (at Riccarton Farm)
- Larriston Burn (at Hewisbridge Cottage)
  - Storff Burn
  - Little Warrington Sike
    - Bught Sike
  - Holm Sikes
- Boghall Burn (at Dinlabyre)
- Riever Sike (at Ovenshank)
- Hermitage Water (near Sandholm)
  - Hartsgarth Burn
    - Routing Burn
  - Thief Sike
  - Paddington Sike
  - Toftholm Sike
  - Roughley Burn
    - Watt's Burn
    - Roughley Sike
    - Laidlehope Burn
    - Leys Burn
  - Whitrope Burn
    - Pirryshiel Sike
    - Sundhope Burn
      - Black Cleuch
      - Windy Cleuch
  - Dinley Burn
  - Braidley Burn
    - Tongue Burn
    - Barley Burn
    - Crib Burn
  - Gorrenberry Burn
  - Billhope Burn
    - Langtae Sike
  - Chapel Grain
    - Caulker Grain
  - Twislehope Burn
- Ryedale Burn (near Brox)
  - Ralton Burn
    - Burnt Burn
    - Rigging Sike
- Black Burn (opposite Whithaugh)
  - Bedda Cleuch
  - Branch Cleuch
  - Hog Gill
  - Long Gill
    - Rough Gill
- Priesthill Burn (at Whithaugh)
- Tweeden Burn (at Tweeden Plantation)
  - Deep Sike
- Tinnis Burn (opposite Kershopefoot)
  - Todhunter Grain
  - Black Grain
  - Green Burn
- Kershope Burn (at Kershopefoot)
  - Clark's Sike
- Muir Burn (near Bankhead)
  - Rae Gill
- Whitlawside Burn (near Whitlawside)
- Archer Beck (near Crookholm)
  - Mid Cleuch
- Rowan Burn (at Rowanburnfoot)

== See also ==
- Liddesdale, valley of the river
- Rivers of Scotland
- List of places in the Scottish Borders
