= Hermitage, Scottish Borders =

Village in Scottish Borders, Scotland

Coordinates: 55.2531°N 2.7804°W

Hermitage is a village near Newcastleton, on the B6399, in the Scottish Borders area of Scotland.

== See also ==
- List of places in the Scottish Borders
- List of places in Scotland
