= Castleton, Scottish Borders =

Village in Scottish Borders, Scotland

Coordinates: 55.1795°N 2.8142°W

Castleton Parish in Roxburghshire, 1845

Castleton (Scottish Gaelic: Baile Chaisteil) is a civil parish in the Scottish Borders area of Scotland, in the former Roxburghshire, in the extreme south of the Borders area. It is bounded by Northumberland (England), Dumfries and Galloway, and the parishes of Hobkirk, Southdean and Teviothead. The village of Castleton was commenced in 1793. It was built as a result of the land clearances in the 1790s when people were forced to move from Old Castleton village. While the parish retained the name Castleton, the village later became identified as New Castleton or Newcastleton. The parish is also known by its older name Liddesdale

The inhabited part of the parish runs alongside the banks of Liddel Water and the Hermitage Water. In the upper Hermitage valley is Hermitage Castle, a massive H-shaped fortress of enormous strength, one of the oldest surviving castles in Scotland. It stands on a hill overlooking Hermitage Water. It was built in 1244 by Nicholas de Soulis, and was captured by the English in David II's reign. It was retaken by Sir William Douglas, who received a grant of it from the king.

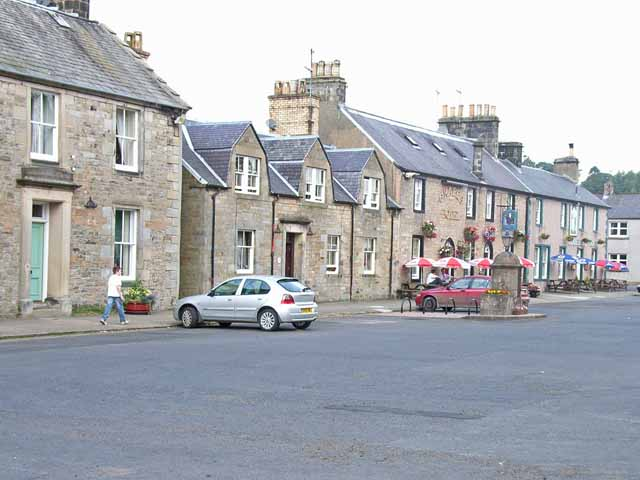
Douglas Square, Newcastleton (New Castleton)

By the Liddel, upstream from Newcastleton, is the settlement of Riccarton. Nearby is the disused Riccarton Junction railway station.

The area of the parish is 67,909 acres, the largest parish in the south of Scotland. The parish consists of that part of Roxburghshire south of the Teviotdale watershed, whose rivers and watercourses drain into the Solway Firth to the west.

== See also ==
- List of places in the Scottish Borders
- List of places in Scotland
