= Hermitage Water =

Watercourse in Scotland

Coordinates: 55°15′N 2°46′W

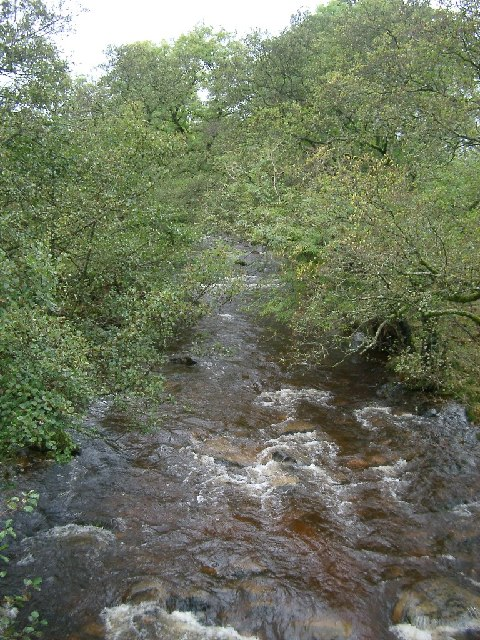
Hermitage Water, upstream from the bridge to Hermitage Castle

The Hermitage Water is a river in Liddesdale, in the Scottish Borders area of Scotland. Among its many feeder burns are Braidley Burn, Dinley Burn, Gorrenberry Burn and Twislehope Burn. The Water flows through the hamlets of Dinley and Gorrenberry, and through the village of Hermitage, and past Hermitage Castle. It continues past Toftholm where it meets the B6399, and passes Newlands, Longhaugh, Leahaugh and Redheugh. At Sandholm it joins the Liddel Water and the dismantled railway.

== See also ==
- Hermitage, Scottish Borders
- Rivers of Scotland
- List of places in the Scottish Borders
