= Liddesdale =

District in Scottish Borders

- Country: Scotland
- Sovereign state: United Kingdom
- Dialling code: 013873
- Police: Scotland
- Fire: Scottish
- Ambulance: Scottish
- UK Parliament: Berwickshire, Roxburgh and Selkirk
- Scottish Parliament: Ettrick, Roxburgh and Berwickshire

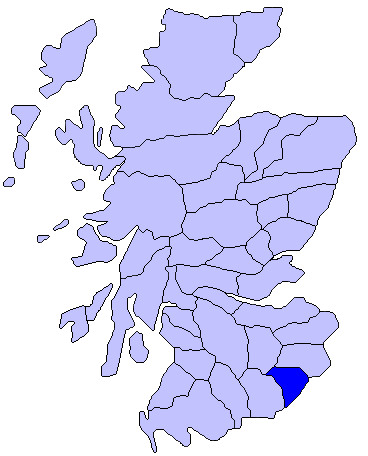
Map of Scotland showing the district of Liddesdale

Liddesdale is a district in the County of Roxburgh, southern Scotland. It includes the area of the valley of the Liddel Water that extends in a south-westerly direction from the vicinity of Peel Fell to the River Esk, a distance of 21 miles (34 km).

== History ==
Liddesdale is sometimes considered to form the northern end of the Maiden Way Roman road.

During the Middle Ages the title of Lord of Liddesdale was held by a number of important Scottish figures.

At one time the points of vantage on the river and its affluents were occupied by freebooters' peel towers, but many of them have disappeared and the remainder are in decay. Larriston Tower belonged to the Elliots, Mangerton, and the Routledge Clan lived in the area. now little more than a site, to the Armstrongs and the Routledge Clan and Park to "Little Jock Elliot", the outlaw who nearly killed Bothwell in an encounter in 1566. Hollows Tower, Johnnie Armstrong's peel, is in good condition; it is on the A7, about 4 mi (6 km) south of Langholm.

In March 1569 Regent Moray came from Kelso to Liddesdale to punish the border people. He spoke to the English border warden, Sir John Forster. Moray was accompanied by Lord Home, Ker of Cessford, Ker of Ferniehirst, and Scot of Buccleuch and 4000 men. After holding unsatisfactory talks with the local leaders, "the best of the surname men", Moray burned the farmsteads in Liddesdale, and did not leave one house standing. He stayed at Mangerton, then had the house blown up with gunpowder and returned to Jedburgh. Liddesdale was a bloody cockpit during the days of the Border reivers, with order supposedly kept by the Keeper of Liddesdale, an important post regarded as almost equivalent to the March Wardens. The best known was Walter Scott, 1st Lord Scott of Buccleuch, known as "the bold Buccleuch".

== Government ==
Liddesdale was also a historic district of Scotland, bordering Teviotdale to the east, Annandale to the west and Tweeddale to the north, with the English county of Cumberland across the border to the south. The area was in the Sheriffdom of Roxburgh and later became part of the County of Roxburgh, one of the counties of Scotland. The main reorganisation took place during the Local Government (Scotland) Act 1889, this Act established a uniform system of county councils and town councils in Scotland and restructured many of Scotland's counties. (See: History of local government in the United Kingdom)

== Notable buildings ==
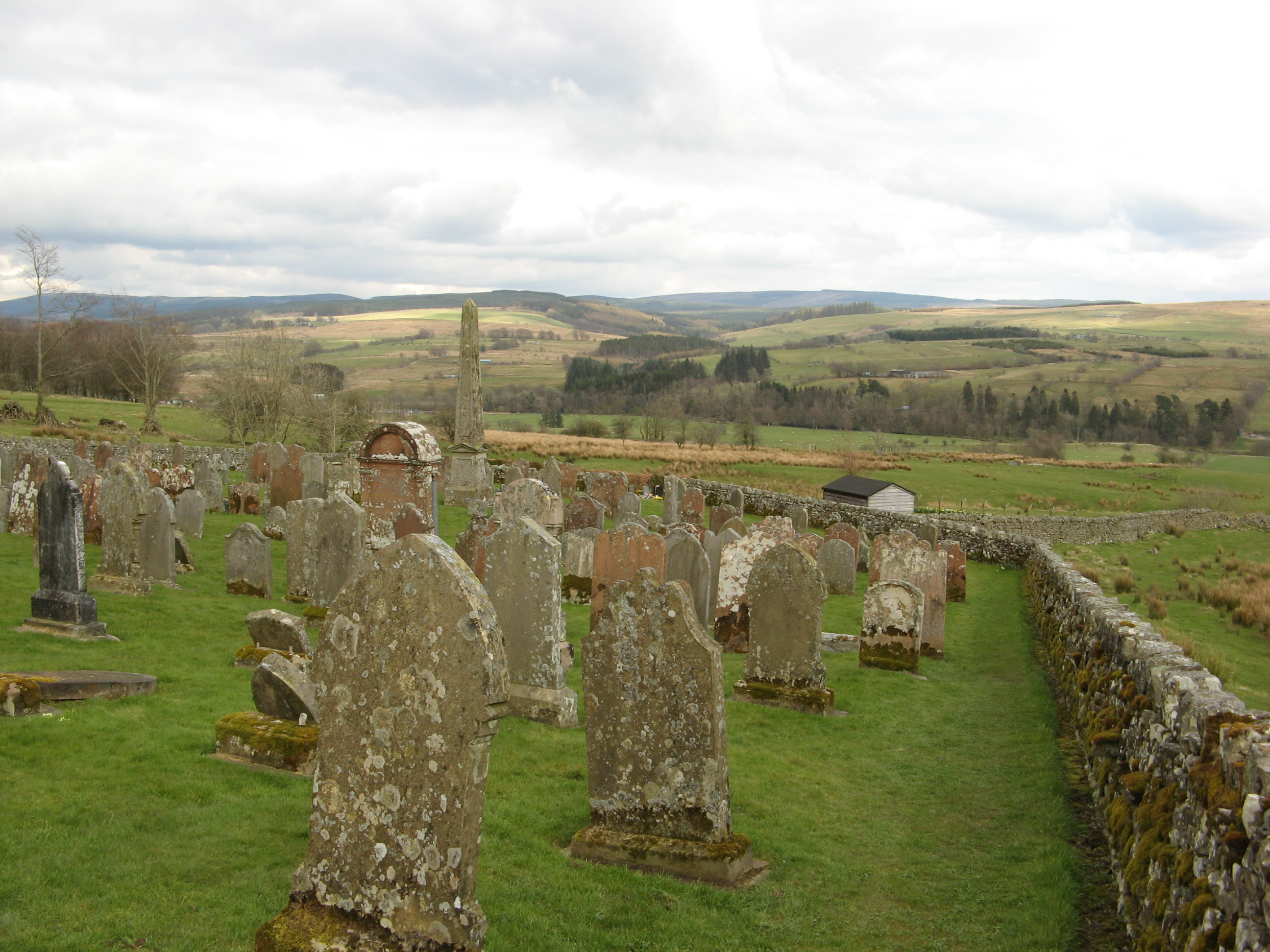
Ettleton cemetery, near Newcastleton

The chief point of interest in the valley, however, is Hermitage Castle, a massive H-shaped fortress of enormous strength, one of the oldest surviving castles in Scotland. It stands on a hill overlooking Hermitage Water, a tributary of the Liddel. It was built in 1244 by Nicholas de Soulis, and was captured by the English in David II's reign. It was retaken by Sir William Douglas, who received a grant of it from the king. In 1492 Archibald Douglas, 5th Earl of Angus, exchanged it for Bothwell Castle on the Clyde with Patrick Hepburn, 1st Earl of Bothwell. It finally passed to the Duke of Buccleuch, under whose care further ruin was arrested. It was here that Sir Alexander Ramsay of Dalhousie was starved to death by Sir William Douglas in 1342, and that James Hepburn, 4th Earl of Bothwell, was visited by Mary, Queen of Scots, after the assault referred to previously.

To the east of the castle is Ninestane Rig, a hill 943 ft (287 m) high, 4 mi (6 km) long and 1.6 mi (3 km) broad. Here it is said that William de Soulis, hated for oppression and cruelty, was (in 1320) boiled by his vassals in a copper cauldron, which was supported on two of the nine stones which composed the "Druidical" circle that gave the ridge its name. Only five of the stones remain.

== Transport ==
The Waverley route of the North British Railway ran down the dale, and the Catrail, or Picts' Dyke, crosses its head.

== Notable persons ==
James Telfer (1802–1862), the writer of ballads, who was born in the parish of Southdean (pronounced Soudan), was for several years schoolmaster of Saughtree, near the head of the valley.

The castle of the lairds of Liddesdale stood near the junction of Hermitage Water and the Liddel, and around it grew up the village of Castleton.

== See also ==
- Newcastleton
- Ettleton
- List of places in the Scottish Borders
