= Newlands, Scottish Borders =

Village in Scottish Borders, Scotland

Coordinates: 55.706°N 3.336°W

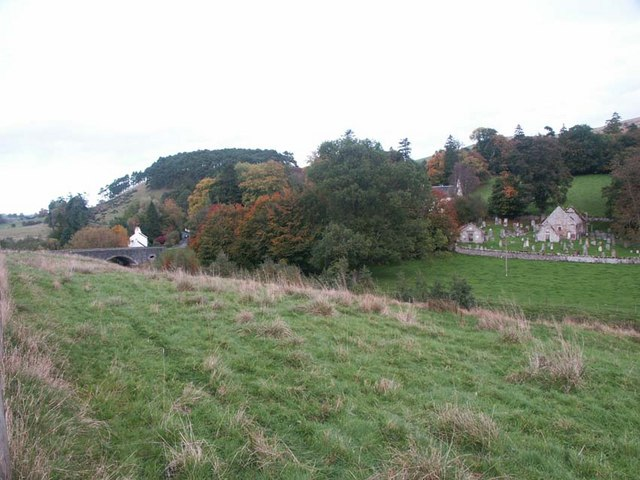
Village of Newlands, Scottish Borders.

Newlands is a parish in the Tweeddale committee area of the Scottish Borders council area, in southeastern Scotland.

== Geography ==
Newlands is on the B7059, off the A701 road, near Bordlands.

Newlands was formerly within the historic county of Peeblesshire.

The Flemington Path is a signed public footpath between Newlands and Peebles.

== See also ==
- List of places in the Scottish Borders
