= Newcastleton =

Village in Scottish Borders, Scotland

Coordinates: 55.17905°N 2.81807°W

Newcastleton: Scots: Copshaw Holm; Copshie
- Location within the Scottish Borders
- Population: 768 (mid 2021 est.)
- OS grid reference: NY480875
- Civil parish: Castleton
- Council area: Scottish Borders
- Lieutenancy area: Roxburgh, Ettrick and Lauderdale
- Country: Scotland
- Sovereign state: United Kingdom
- Post town: NEWCASTLETON
- Postcode district: TD9
- Dialling code: 013873
- Police: Scotland
- Fire: Scottish
- Ambulance: Scottish
- UK Parliament: Berwickshire, Roxburgh and Selkirk
- Scottish Parliament: Ettrick, Roxburgh and Berwickshire

Newcastleton, also called Copshaw Holm, is a village in Liddesdale, the Scottish Borders, a few miles from the border with England, on the Liddel Water. It is within the county of Roxburghshire. It is the site of Hermitage Castle.

Newcastleton is 10 miles (16 km) east of Langholm, 17 miles (27 km) south of Hawick, 24 miles (39 km) north of Carlisle and 74 miles (119 km) south of Edinburgh.

== History ==
Newcastleton was built as a result of the land clearances in the 1790s when people were forced to move from Old Castleton village. There has been a folk festival at Newcastleton since 1970. "Copshaw Holm" (another name for the village) is celebrated in the song "Copshawholm Fair", written by David Anderson in 1830, as sung by Willie Scott among others.

In 2020, the local community purchased 5,000 acres (2,000 hectares) of Langholm Moor for £3.8m from Buccleuch Estates.

== Amenities ==
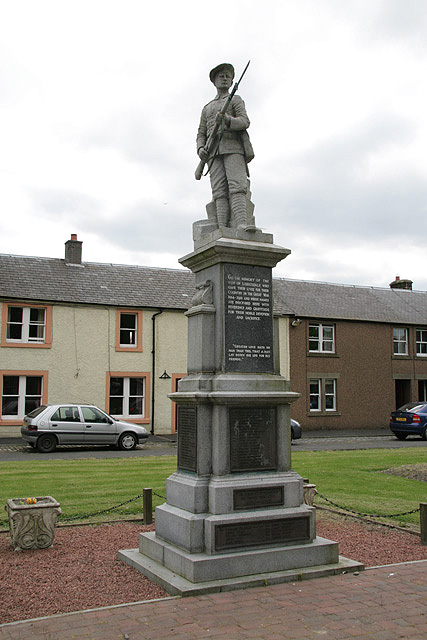
Newcastleton War Memorial

A community-owned unmanned fuel station opened after much community fund raising in 2018.

The former Townfoot Church (erected in 1803) now houses the Liddesdale Heritage Centre, a museum devoted to the culture and history of Liddesdale. Newcastleton Forest is near the village, and is home to one of the 7stanes mountain bike centres.

Newcastleton is the location of Whithaugh Park, an outdoor activity and residential centre run by Rock UK, offering groups of young people the opportunity to try out a variety of different outdoor activities. The village also possesses the amenity of an astroturf multi-sport pitch (Polysport), as well as a gym and football pitch. There is also a children's playground.

There is a nine-hole golf course on the Holm Hill.

== Common riding ==
Since 1998, an annual light-hearted common riding was established, being held on the same weekend as the music festival. The elected principal to represent the event is referred to as The Tub, aided by the principal's Right and Left Legged men/women, wearing the village colour of yellow. Unlike other ridings in the Borders, the Copshaw Common Riding is done on bicycle. The Copshie participants parody the over-formality of nearby Langholm and other pageants, by proceeding on bikes, giving four cheers instead of three, toasting with tequila instead of whisky, and not taking themselves too seriously.

== Other events ==
A traditional music festival is held every year in Newcastleton, around July. The Holm Show is an annual traditional agricultural event.

In recent years, an annual darts competition, The Newcastleton Open, has been held on the Saturday of the Early May Bank Holiday weekend. The competition attracts professionals and amateurs alike, from the South of Scotland, and across the breadth of the North of England.

== Transport ==
The village has direct bus services to Hawick, Langholm and Carlisle. Newcastleton railway station provided rail services from 1862 until its closure in 1969 as part of the Beeching cuts.

== Economy ==
Agriculture and forestry is the main provider of employment, many people also travel to Carlisle, Hawick and Langholm for work.

Buccleuch Estates have an office in nearby Langholm and own much of the land surrounding Newcastleton.

== Local media ==
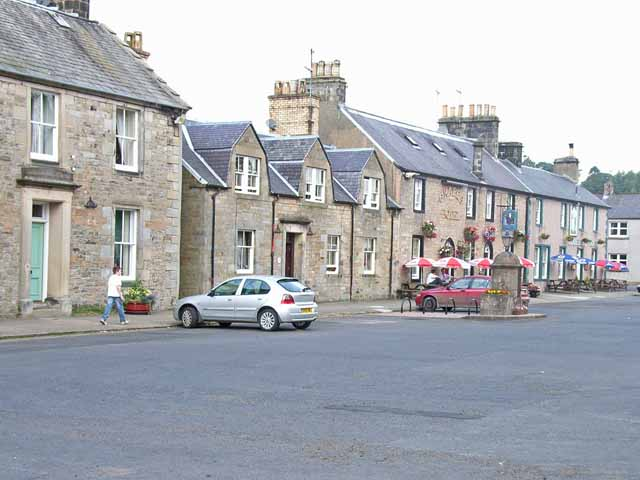
Douglas Square, Newcastleton

=== Newspaper ===
The local newspaper is the Eskdale & Liddesdale Advertiser. The paper is commonly referred to locally as 'The Squeak'. Established in 1848, the newspaper was the first penny newspaper in Scotland.

== See also ==
- Castleton Parish
- Hermitage Water
- List of places in the Scottish Borders
- List of places in Scotland
- Duke of Buccleuch
- Kielder Water
