= Hermitage Castle =

Semi-ruined castle in Scotland

Coordinates: 55.2556°N 2.7933°W

- Near Newcastleton, Roxburghshire, Scotland; GB grid reference NY495960
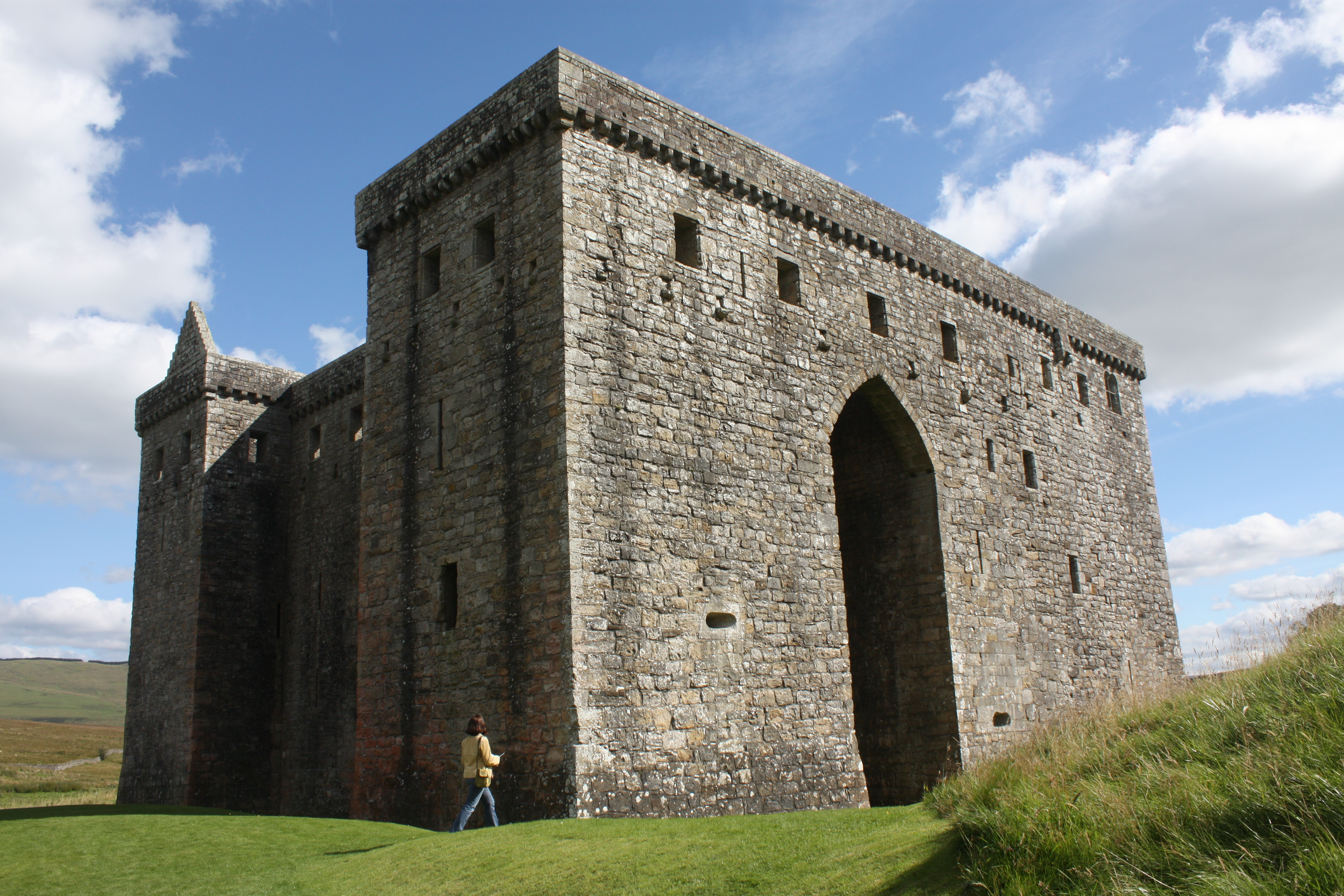
- Hermitage Castle

Site information
- Type: First phase: motte and bailey Second phase: tower house/keep with barmkin
- Owner: Historic Scotland
- Open to the public: Yes
- Condition: Partially ruined

Site history
- Built: First phase: c.1240 Second phase: mid 14th century
- Built by: First phase: Nicholas de Soulis; Second phase: William Douglas, 1st Earl of Douglas
- In use: Until 1603
- Materials: First phase: timber Second phase: stone

Hermitage Castle is a semi-ruined castle in the border region of Scotland. It stands in the remote valley of the Hermitage Water, part of Liddesdale in Roxburghshire. It is under the care of Historic Scotland. The castle has a reputation, both from its history and its appearance, as one of the most sinister and atmospheric castles in Scotland.

== History ==
=== Origins of the name ===
It is thought that the name derives from Old French: l'armitage – guardhouse. The castle was known as the guardhouse of the bloodiest valley in Britain, and the "Strength of Liddesdale".

Hermitage Castle was supposedly built by one Nicholas de Soulis around 1240, in a typical Norman Motte and Bailey pattern. It stayed in his family until approximately 1320 when his descendant, William de Soulis, forfeited it because of suspected witchcraft and the attempted regicide of King Robert I of Scotland. Legend has it that Soulis's tenantry, having suffered unbearable depredations, arrested him, and at the nearby Ninestane Rig (a megalithic circle), had him encased in lead sheet and boiled to death. In actuality, he died, a prisoner, in Dumbarton Castle.

=== Under the Douglases ===
In 1338, the then incumbent, Englishman Sir Ralph de Neville was besieged by Sir William Douglas, The Knight of Liddesdale, known as the "Flower of Chivalry". It was here that Douglas imprisoned and starved to death Sir Alexander Ramsay of Dalhousie. his competitor for royal favour. After the Battle of Neville's Cross and Liddesdale's capture by the English, the castle fell into the hands of the English for a time and was given to the care of William Dacre, 2nd Baron Dacre. Upon Liddesdale's death, brought about by a near kinsman, William Douglas, 1st Earl of Douglas, the castle was given to the then baron but later 1st Earl of Douglas. He enabled the construction of most of the present building, possibly with the help of John Lewin, master mason at Durham Cathedral. The castle remained in the hands of the Black Douglases until 1455. The Black Douglas line had so incensed the King that James Douglas, 9th Earl of Douglas was forfeited, never to return to Scotland, and the beneficences that they had enjoyed passed to the Red Douglas line, including Hermitage Castle.

=== Under the Hepburns ===
King James IV was suspicious of the then Earl of Angus, Archibald, Bell the Cat and his relationship with Henry VII of England, and ordered him to relinquish The Hermitage to the Crown. On 6 March 1492 Patrick Hepburn, 1st Earl of Bothwell had a charter of the lands and lordship of Liddesdale, including The Hermitage Castle, etc., upon the resignation of the same by Archibald Douglas, Earl of Angus, the latter getting the lordship of Bothwell (but not the Earldom) which Patrick in turn had resigned for the exchange. The Hepburns of Bothwell, then rising in favour with the king, became keepers and lords of The Hermitage.

In December 1562, Mary, Queen of Scots sent Adam MacCulloch, Marchmont Herald, to Hermitage Castle, demanding its surrender to John Stewart of Traquair. Traquair received money and cereal from the Thirds of Benefices as a contribution to the castle provisions.

In time, James Hepburn, 4th Earl of Bothwell, held the castle. Mary, Queen of Scots, made a famous marathon journey on horseback from Jedburgh to visit the wounded Bothwell there, only a few weeks after the birth of her son. Bothwell had been injured by John Elliot of Park. He had captured Elliot with other border reivers, and brought him to the Hermitage. Elliot tried to escape and Bothwell shot him with his pistol. The wounded man managed to injure Bothwell with a two-handed sword.

Mary and Bothwell were to marry shortly after the murder of her 2nd husband Henry Stuart, Lord Darnley, regardless of the fact that Bothwell was implicated amongst the conspirators. After Mary's forced abdication following the confrontation at Carberry Hill, Bothwell, facing charges of treason, fled to Norway and his titles and estates were forfeited by Act of Parliament. Whilst attempting to raise an army to restore Mary to the throne, he was arrested by King Frederik's men for breach of marriage contract with Anna Throndsen, and imprisoned at Dragsholm Castle in Denmark, where he died insane and in appalling conditions. His mummified body could at one time be seen at the nearby Fårevejle Church.

Thomas Kerr of Ferniehirst was made keeper of Liddesdale and Hermitage Castle in 1584. Bothwell's nephew, Francis Stewart, 1st Earl of Bothwell received a new creation as Earl of Bothwell, and was made Keeper of the castle. As a grandson of James V, albeit through an illegitimate line, he was viewed by some as a potential replacement for James VI. In 1591, Bothwell was arrested, tried, gaoled and forfeited for his supposed involvement with the infamous North Berwick Witches. He obtained a pardon in 1593 but again became involved in intrigue and he was again attainted, by Act of Parliament, on 21 July 1593. The Hermitage once again reverted to the Crown.

=== Under the Scotts ===
The following year, James granted the castle to Sir Walter Scott of Buccleuch ("the bold Buccleuch"), a notorious Border reiver, Warden of the western marches, Keeper of Liddesdale, and leader of the daring and infamous attack on Carlisle Castle to rescue Willie Armstrong of Kinmont.

=== Decline ===
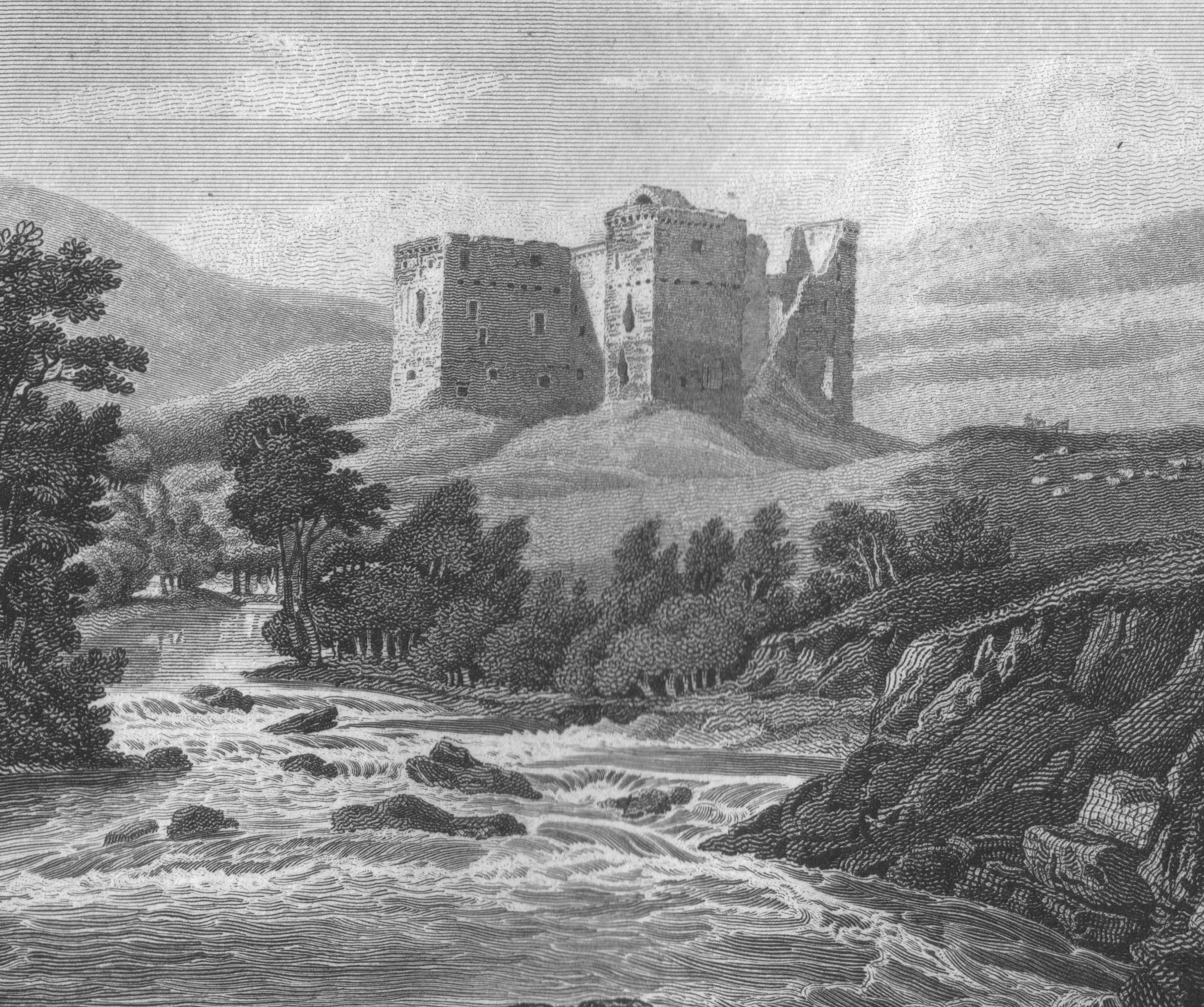
Hermitage Castle in 1814.

The castle became obsolete after the Union of the Crowns, in 1603 and fell into disrepair; by the turn of the eighteenth century it was a ruin. Hermitage gave its name to the Viscountcy of Hermitage, conferred in 1706 on Henry, third son of the first Duke of Buccleuch as a subsidiary title of the Earldom of Deloraine. This title became extinct in 1807. Some repairs to the castle were carried out in 1820 by the fifth Duke of Buccleuch. The Scotts are descended matrilinearly from the Douglases of Drumlanrig, a cadet branch, and sometimes use the surname Montagu-Douglas-Scott, thus maintaining a continuity with earlier times.

=== Today ===
The castle remained a property of the Scotts until 1930, when it was handed over to the care of the Nation. It is now cared for by Historic Environment Scotland, an executive agency of the Scottish Government, and is open to visitors from 1 April to 31 October each year. It is closed during the winter season. The castle, together with a series of ancillary features, is protected as a scheduled monument.

== Ghostlore ==
Hermitage Castle is the subject of local ghostlore stories where it is reputed to be haunted by both Redcap Sly, de Soulis's familiar spirit, and by Mary, Queen of Scots.

== Gallery ==
An old photograph of the Castle, possibly dating from c1860

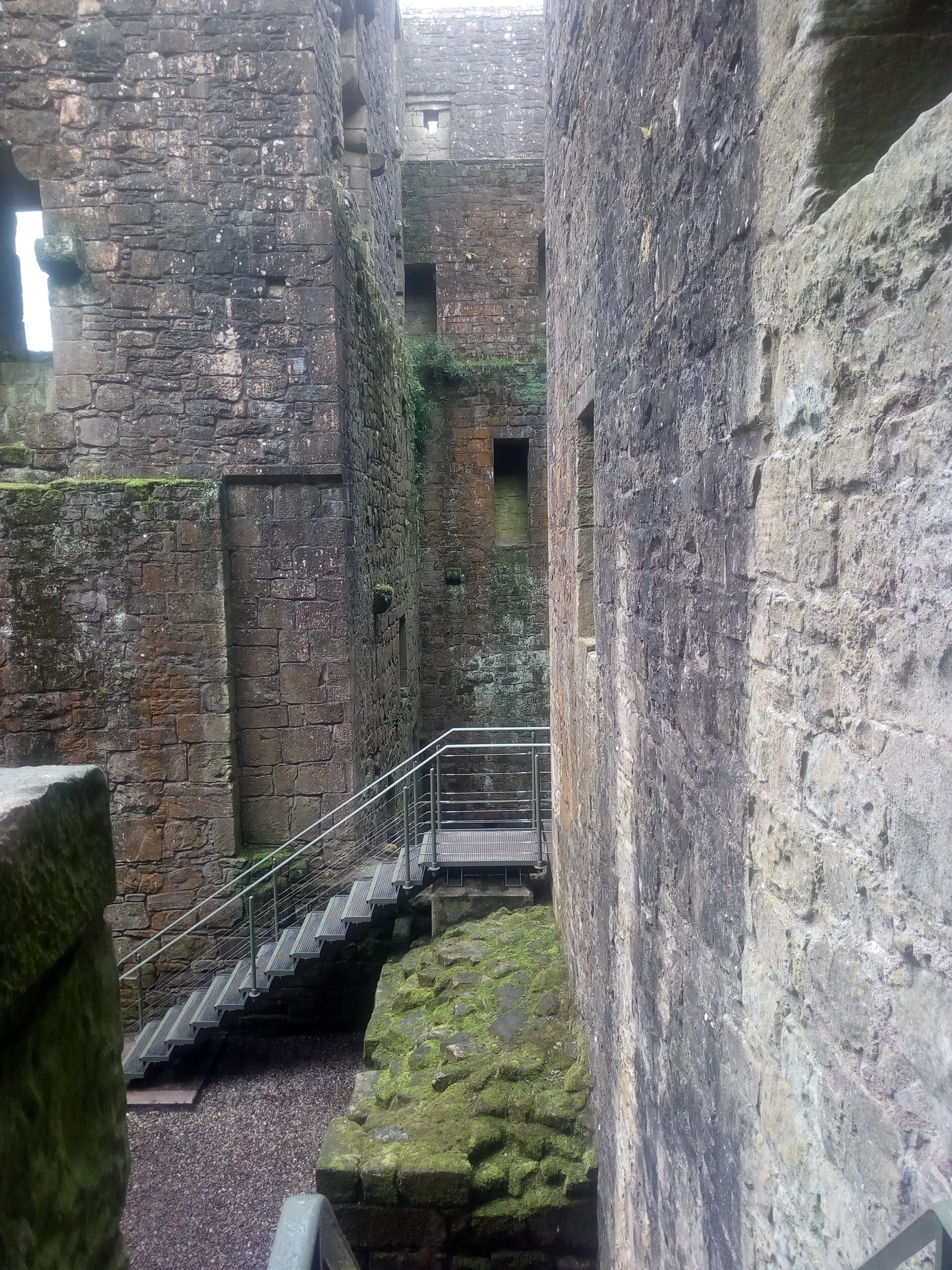
Inside Hermitage Castle

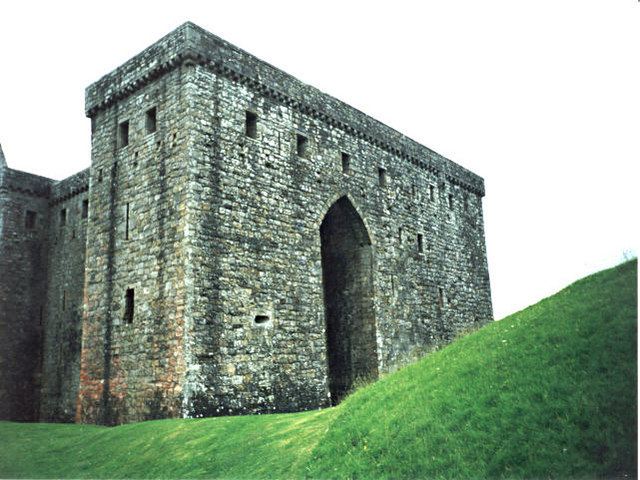

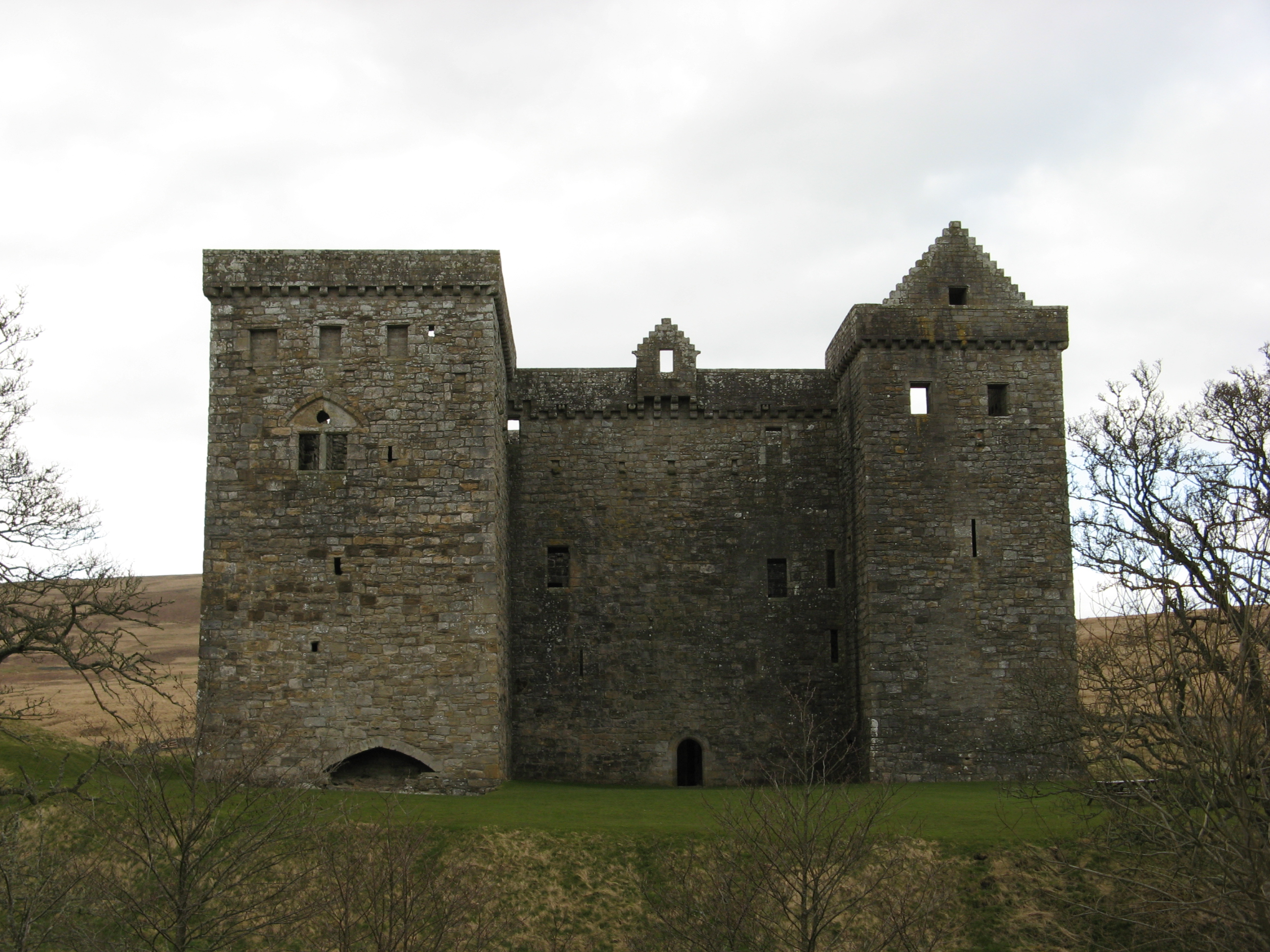

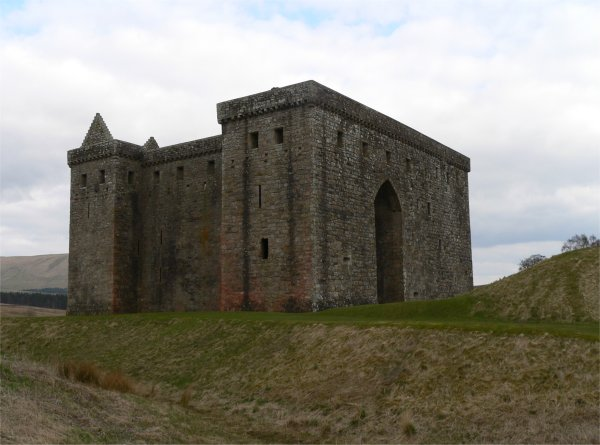

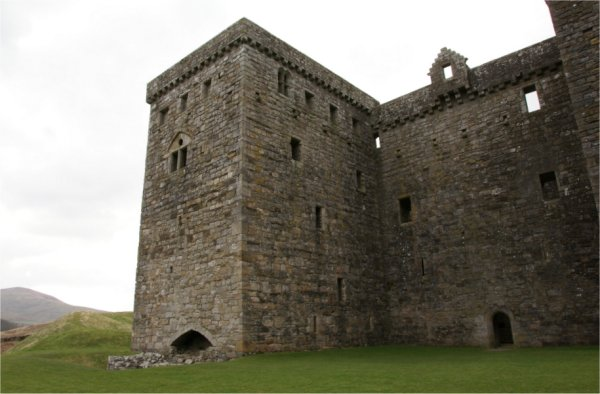

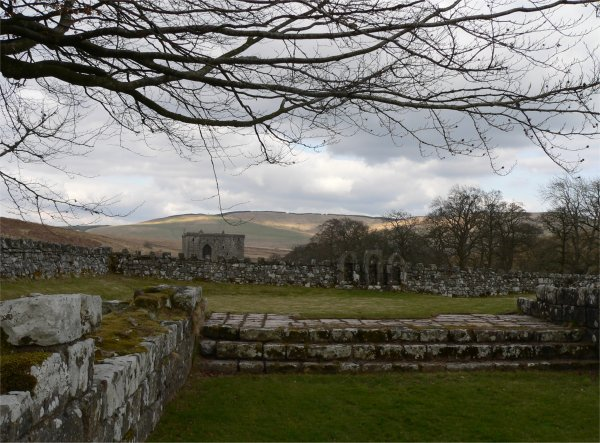
Hermitage Castle seen from the ruined chapel

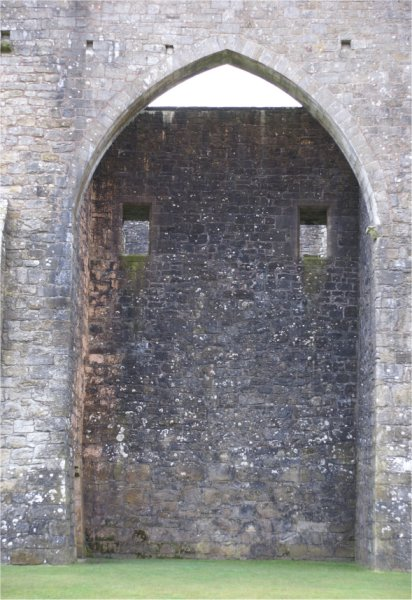

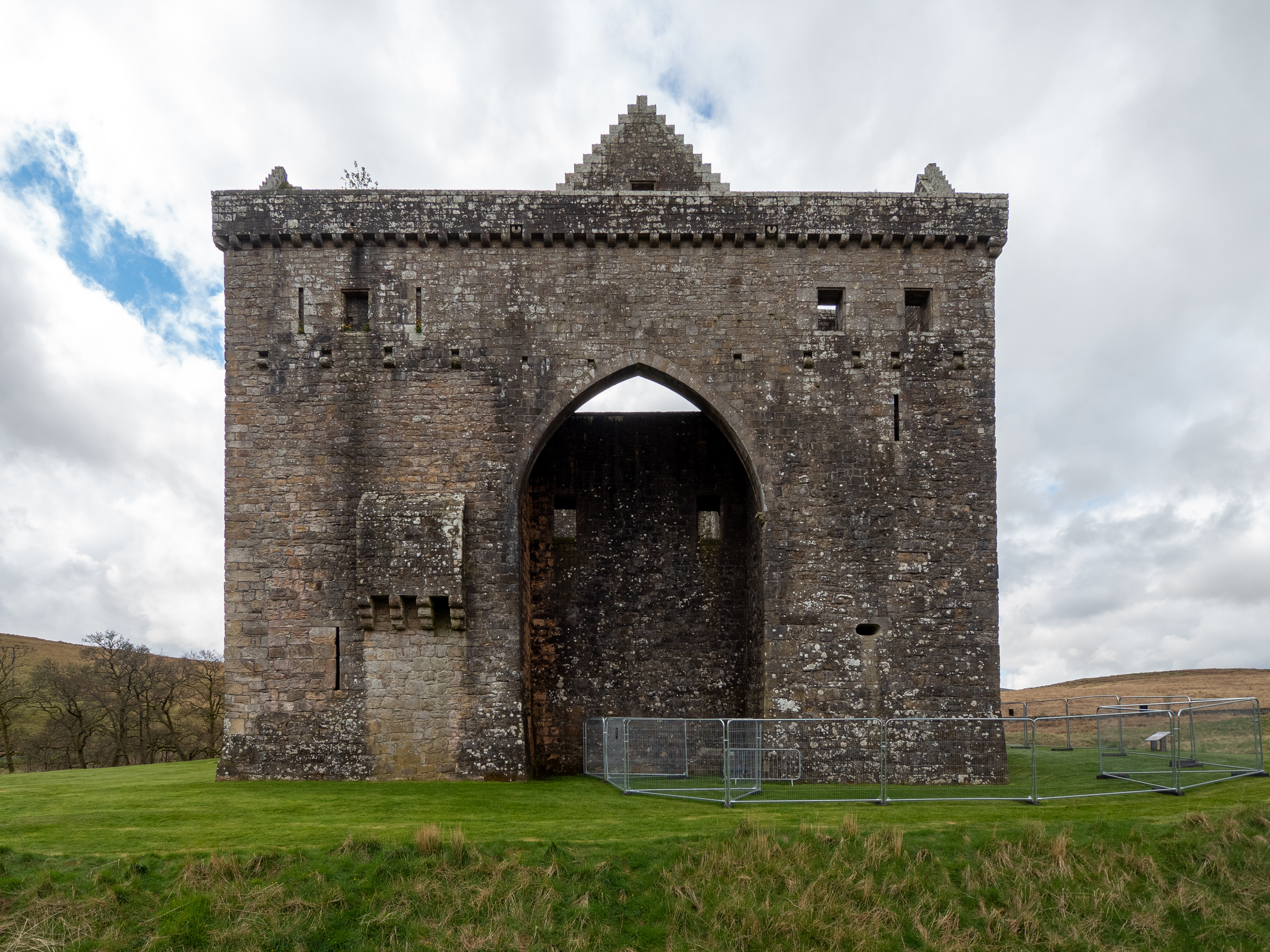
Rear of castle

== See also ==
- Hermitage, Scottish Borders
- Hermitage Water
- List of places in the Scottish Borders
- List of places in Scotland
