= List of United Kingdom locations: Car-Cd =

The United Kingdom

This is part of the list of United Kingdom locations: a gazetteer of place names in the United Kingdom showing each place's locality and geographical coordinates.

== Ca (continued) ==
=== Car ===
Location	Locality	Coordinates (links to map & photo sources)	OS grid reference
Caradon Town	Cornwall	50.51°N 04.41°W	SX2971
Cara Island	Argyll and Bute	55.63°N 05.75°W	NR638438
Carbis	Cornwall	50.39°N 04.81°W	SX0059
Carbis Bay	Cornwall	50.19°N 05.47°W	SW5238
Carbost (Trotternish)	Highland	57.44°N 06.30°W	NG4248
Carbost (Loch Harport)	Highland	57.29°N 06.35°W	NG3831
Carbrain	North Lanarkshire	55.94°N 03.98°W	NS7674
Carbrook	Sheffield	53.39°N 01.42°W	SK3889
Carbrooke	Norfolk	52.58°N 00.86°E	TF9402
Carburton	Nottinghamshire	53.25°N 01.08°W	SK6173
Carclaze	Cornwall	50.35°N 04.78°W	SX0254
Carclew	Cornwall	50.20°N 05.11°W	SW7838
Car Colston	Nottinghamshire	52.97°N 00.92°W	SK7242
Carcroft	Doncaster	53.58°N 01.18°W	SE5410
Cardenden	Fife	56.14°N 03.25°W	NT2295
Cardeston	Shropshire	52.70°N 02.90°W	SJ3912
Cardew	Cumbria	54.83°N 03.02°W	NY3449
Cardewlees	Cumbria	54.84°N 03.02°W	NY3451
Cardhu	Moray	57.47°N 03.35°W	NJ1943
Cardiff	City of Cardiff	51.47°N 03.18°W	ST1876
Cardigan	Ceredigion	52.08°N 04.67°W	SN1746
Cardigan Island	Ceredigion	52.13°N 04.68°W	SN160514
Cardinal's Green	Cambridgeshire	52.09°N 00.36°E	TL6146
Cardington	Shropshire	52.55°N 02.73°W	SO5095
Cardington	Bedfordshire	52.11°N 00.42°W	TL0847
Cardinham	Cornwall	50.48°N 04.65°W	SX1268
Cardonald	City of Glasgow	55.84°N 04.34°W	NS5364
Cardrona	Scottish Borders	55.64°N 03.11°W	NT3039
Cardross	Argyll and Bute	55.95°N 04.66°W	NS3477
Cardurnock	Cumbria	54.91°N 03.29°W	NY1758
Careby	Lincolnshire	52.73°N 00.49°W	TF0216
Careston	Angus	56.72°N 02.76°W	NO5360
Care Village	Leicestershire	52.55°N 00.93°W	SP7296
Carew	Pembrokeshire	51.69°N 04.83°W	SN0403
Carew Cheriton	Pembrokeshire	51.68°N 04.83°W	SN0402
Carew Newton	Pembrokeshire	51.70°N 04.83°W	SN0404
Carey	Herefordshire	51.97°N 02.64°W	SO5631
Carey Park	Cornwall	50.33°N 04.51°W	SX2151
Carfin	North Lanarkshire	55.80°N 03.96°W	NS7758
Carfrae	East Lothian	55.91°N 02.68°W	NT5769
Carfury	Cornwall	50.15°N 05.58°W	SW4434
Cargate Common	Norfolk	52.46°N 01.13°E	TM1390
Cargenbridge	Dumfries and Galloway	55.04°N 03.64°W	NX9574
Cargill	Perth and Kinross	56.50°N 03.38°W	NO1536
Cargo	Cumbria	54.92°N 03.00°W	NY3659
Cargo Fleet	Middlesbrough	54.57°N 01.21°W	NZ5120
Cargreen	Cornwall	50.43°N 04.21°W	SX4362
Carhampton	Somerset	51.16°N 03.43°W	ST0042
Carharrack	Cornwall	50.22°N 05.18°W	SW7341
Carisbrooke	Isle of Wight	50.68°N 01.32°W	SZ4888
Carishader	Western Isles	58.19°N 06.95°W	NB0933
Cark	Cumbria	54.17°N 02.98°W	SD3676
Carkeel	Cornwall	50.41°N 04.23°W	SX4160
Carlabhagh (Carloway)	Western Isles	58.27°N 06.77°W	NB2042
Carlbury	North Yorkshire	54.53°N 01.67°W	NZ2115
Carlby	Lincolnshire	52.70°N 00.44°W	TF0513
Carlecotes	Barnsley	53.52°N 01.74°W	SE1703
Carleen	Cornwall	50.12°N 05.34°W	SW6130
Carlenrig	Scottish Borders	55.32°N 02.96°W	NT3904
Carlesmoor	North Yorkshire	54.15°N 01.72°W	SE1873
Carleton (Carlisle)	Cumbria	54.85°N 02.90°W	NY4252
Carleton (Eden)	Cumbria	54.65°N 02.73°W	NY5329
Carleton (Copeland)	Cumbria	54.46°N 03.52°W	NY0109
Carleton	Lancashire	53.84°N 03.01°W	SD3339
Carleton (Carleton-in-Craven)	North Yorkshire	53.93°N 02.04°W	SD9749
Carleton	Wakefield	53.67°N 01.30°W	SE4620
Carleton Forehoe	Norfolk	52.60°N 01.08°E	TG0905
Carleton Hall	Cumbria	54.36°N 03.41°W	SD0898
Carleton Rode	Norfolk	52.48°N 01.10°E	TM1192
Carleton St Peter	Norfolk	52.56°N 01.45°E	TG3402
Carley Hill	Sunderland	54.92°N 01.40°W	NZ3859
Carlidnack	Cornwall	50.11°N 05.12°W	SW7729
Carlingcott	Bath and North East Somerset	51.32°N 02.44°W	ST6958
Carlinghow	Kirklees	53.71°N 01.65°W	SE2324
Carlingwark	Devon	50.91°N 03.19°W	ST1613
Carlin How	Redcar and Cleveland	54.56°N 00.91°W	NZ7019
Carlisle	Cumbria	54.88°N 02.95°W	NY3955
Carloggas (Mawgan-in-Pydar)	Cornwall	50.44°N 05.00°W	SW8765
Carloggas (St Stephen-in-Brannel)	Cornwall	50.35°N 04.88°W	SW9554
Carlops	Scottish Borders	55.78°N 03.34°W	NT1655
Carlton	Barnsley	53.58°N 01.45°W	SE3610
Carlton	Bedfordshire	52.18°N 00.61°W	SP9555
Carlton	Cambridgeshire	52.15°N 00.39°E	TL6453
Carlton	Leeds	53.73°N 01.50°W	SE3327
Carlton	Leicestershire	52.64°N 01.42°W	SK3905
Carlton (Selby)	North Yorkshire	53.70°N 01.03°W	SE6424
Carlton (Richmondshire)	North Yorkshire	54.25°N 01.90°W	SE0684
Carlton (Hambleton)	North Yorkshire	54.26°N 01.08°W	SE6086
Carlton	Nottinghamshire	52.96°N 01.10°W	SK6041
Carlton	Stockton-on-Tees	54.58°N 01.39°W	NZ3921
Carlton	Suffolk	52.22°N 01.48°E	TM3864
Carlton Colville	Suffolk	52.45°N 01.69°E	TM5190
Carlton Curlieu	Leicestershire	52.56°N 00.98°W	SP6997
Carlton Green	Cambridgeshire	52.13°N 00.39°E	TL6451
Carlton Husthwaite	North Yorkshire	54.17°N 01.25°W	SE4976
Carlton in Cleveland	North Yorkshire	54.42°N 01.23°W	NZ5004
Carlton in Lindrick	Nottinghamshire	53.35°N 01.11°W	SK5984
Carlton-le-Moorland	Lincolnshire	53.10°N 00.65°W	SK9057
Carlton Miniott	North Yorkshire	54.22°N 01.40°W	SE3981
Carlton-on-Trent	Nottinghamshire	53.15°N 00.81°W	SK7963
Carlton Purlieus	Northamptonshire	52.47°N 00.77°W	SP8387
Carlton Scroop	Lincolnshire	52.99°N 00.58°W	SK9545
Carluddon	Cornwall	50.36°N 04.78°W	SX0255
Carluke	South Lanarkshire	55.73°N 03.84°W	NS8450
Carlyon Bay	Cornwall	50.33°N 04.74°W	SX0552
Carmarthen	Carmarthenshire	51.85°N 04.31°W	SN4120
Carmel	Powys	52.28°N 03.39°W	SO0566
Carmel	Carmarthenshire	51.82°N 04.06°W	SN5816
Carmel	Isle of Anglesey	53.31°N 04.43°W	SH3882
Carmel	Gwynedd	53.06°N 04.25°W	SH4954
Carmel	Flintshire	53.27°N 03.24°W	SJ1776
Carmel Head	Isle of Anglesey	53.40°N 04.56°W	SH295928
Carmichael	South Lanarkshire	55.62°N 03.71°W	NS9238
Carminish	Western Isles	57.74°N 07.01°W	NG0284
Carminow Cross	Cornwall	50.45°N 04.70°W	SX0865
Carmunnock	East Renfrewshire	55.78°N 04.25°W	NS5957
Carmyle	South Lanarkshire	55.82°N 04.17°W	NS6461
Carmyllie	Angus	56.56°N 02.75°W	NO5442
Carna	Highland	56.65°N 05.88°W	NM622585
Carnaby	East Riding of Yorkshire	54.06°N 00.25°W	TA1465
Carnach	Moray	57.51°N 03.67°W	NJ0048
Carnach (Càrnach)	Highland	57.90°N 05.36°W	NH0196
Carnach (Càrnach)	Western Isles	57.87°N 06.69°W	NG2297
Carnachuin	Highland	57.01°N 03.91°W	NN8493
Carnachy	Highland	58.42°N 04.19°W	NC7251
Carnan (Càrnan)	Western Isles	57.39°N 07.34°W	NF7946
Carn Arthen	Cornwall	50.20°N 05.26°W	SW6739
Carnassarie	Argyll and Bute	56.15°N 05.49°W	NM8301
Carnbee	Fife	56.24°N 02.76°W	NO5306
Carnbo	Perth and Kinross	56.21°N 03.53°W	NO0503
Carn Brea Village	Cornwall	50.22°N 05.25°W	SW6841
Carnbroe	North Lanarkshire	55.84°N 04.01°W	NS7463
Càrn Deas	Highland	57.96°N 05.44°W	NB962024
Carne (Gillan Creek)	Cornwall	50.07°N 05.11°W	SW7724
Carne (St Dennis)	Cornwall	50.38°N 04.88°W	SW9558
Carne (Veryan)	Cornwall	50.20°N 04.93°W	SW9138
Carnebone	Cornwall	50.13°N 05.22°W	SW7031
Carnedd	Powys	52.50°N 03.44°W	SO0291
Carnegie	Angus	56.55°N 02.76°W	NO5341
Carnetown	Rhondda, Cynon, Taff	51.63°N 03.34°W	ST0794
Carnforth	Lancashire	54.12°N 02.78°W	SD4970
Carnglas	Swansea	51.61°N 04.00°W	SS6193
Carnhedryn	Pembrokeshire	51.89°N 05.21°W	SM7927
Carnhedryn Uchaf	Pembrokeshire	51.89°N 05.21°W	SM7927
Carnhell Green	Cornwall	50.18°N 05.34°W	SW6137
Carnhot	Cornwall	50.26°N 05.17°W	SW7445
Carnkie (Wendron)	Cornwall	50.16°N 05.20°W	SW7134
Carnkie (Redruth)	Cornwall	50.20°N 05.25°W	SW6839
Carnkief	Cornwall	50.32°N 05.12°W	SW7852
Carno	Powys	52.55°N 03.55°W	SN9596
Carnock	Fife	56.07°N 03.54°W	NT0488
Carnon Downs	Cornwall	50.21°N 05.09°W	SW7940
Carnoustie	Angus	56.49°N 02.71°W	NO5634
Carnsmerry	Cornwall	50.38°N 04.80°W	SX0158
Carn Towan	Cornwall	50.07°N 05.69°W	SW3626
Carntyne	City of Glasgow	55.85°N 04.19°W	NS6365
Carnwadric	City of Glasgow	55.80°N 04.33°W	NS5459
Carnwath	South Lanarkshire	55.69°N 03.62°W	NS9846
Carnyorth	Cornwall	50.13°N 05.68°W	SW3733
Caroe	Cornwall	50.68°N 04.60°W	SX1691
Carol Green	Solihull	52.39°N 01.63°W	SP2577
Caroy	Highland	57.39°N 06.49°W	NG3043
Carpalla	Cornwall	50.35°N 04.86°W	SW9654
Carpenders Park	Hertfordshire	51.62°N 00.38°W	TQ1293
Carpenter's Hill	Worcestershire	52.32°N 01.89°W	SP0770
Carperby	North Yorkshire	54.29°N 02.00°W	SE0089
Carr	Rotherham	53.40°N 01.23°W	SK5190
Carr	Bury	53.64°N 02.33°W	SD7817
Carradale	Argyll and Bute	55.58°N 05.47°W	NR8138
Carragraich	Western Isles	57.88°N 06.74°W	NG1998
Carr Bank	Cumbria	54.19°N 02.81°W	SD4778
Carrbridge	Highland	57.27°N 03.82°W	NH9022
Carrbrook	Tameside	53.50°N 02.03°W	SD9801
Carr Cross	Lancashire	53.61°N 02.95°W	SD3714
Carreg Ddu	Gwynedd	52.93°N 04.57°W	SH274411
Carreglefn	Isle of Anglesey	53.37°N 04.43°W	SH3889
Carregwastad Point	Pembrokeshire	52.02°N 05.03°W	SM920403
Carreg-wen	Pembrokeshire	52.03°N 04.59°W	SN2241
Carreg y Gath	Gwynedd	53.16°N 04.12°W	SH5865
Carr Gate	Wakefield	53.71°N 01.53°W	SE3124
Carr Green	Cheshire	53.38°N 02.43°W	SJ7188
Carr Hill	Gateshead	54.94°N 01.59°W	NZ2661
Carrhouse	Devon	50.84°N 03.74°W	SS7706
Carr Houses	Sefton	53.51°N 03.02°W	SD3203
Carrick	Fife	56.38°N 02.90°W	NO4422
Carrick Castle	Argyll and Bute	56.10°N 04.91°W	NS1994
Carriden	Falkirk	56.01°N 03.58°W	NT0181
Carrington	Trafford	53.42°N 02.39°W	SJ7492
Carrington	Lincolnshire	53.06°N 00.04°W	TF3154
Carrington	Nottinghamshire	52.97°N 01.16°W	SK5642
Carrington	Midlothian	55.82°N 03.10°W	NT3160
Carrog	Denbighshire	52.97°N 03.34°W	SJ1043
Carrog	Conwy	53.00°N 03.84°W	SH7647
Carron	Falkirk	56.01°N 03.88°W	NS828822
Carron	Moray	57.45°N 03.30°W	NJ2241
Carronbridge	Dumfries and Galloway	55.25°N 03.79°W	NX8697
Carronshore	Falkirk	56.02°N 03.79°W	NS8883
Carroway Head	Warwickshire	52.58°N 01.78°W	SP1599
Carrow Hill	Monmouthshire	51.60°N 02.82°W	ST4390
Carrshield	Northumberland	54.81°N 02.31°W	NY8047
Carrutherstown	Dumfries and Galloway	55.02°N 03.40°W	NY1071
Carr Vale	Derbyshire	53.21°N 01.31°W	SK4669
Carrville	Durham	54.78°N 01.53°W	NZ3043
Carsaig (Mainland)	Argyll and Bute	56.02°N 05.64°W	NR7387
Carsaig (Ross of Mull)	Argyll and Bute	56.31°N 05.98°W	NM5421
Carsegownie	Angus	56.67°N 02.81°W	NO5054
Carshalton	Sutton	51.36°N 00.17°W	TQ2764
Carshalton Beeches	Sutton	51.35°N 00.17°W	TQ2763
Carshalton on the Hill	Sutton	51.35°N 00.16°W	TQ2863
Carsington	Derbyshire	53.07°N 01.62°W	SK2553
Carsluith	Dumfries and Galloway	54.85°N 04.36°W	NX4854
Carsphairn	Dumfries and Galloway	55.21°N 04.26°W	NX5693
Carstairs	South Lanarkshire	55.69°N 03.70°W	NS9346
Carstairs Junction	South Lanarkshire	55.68°N 03.67°W	NS9545
Carswell Marsh	Oxfordshire	51.68°N 01.53°W	SU3298
Cartbridge	Surrey	51.29°N 00.55°W	TQ0156
Carterhaugh	Scottish Borders	55.52°N 02.90°W	NT4326
Carter Knowle	Sheffield	53.35°N 01.50°W	SK3384
Carter's Clay	Hampshire	51.01°N 01.57°W	SU3024
Carter's Green	Essex	51.76°N 00.18°E	TL5110
Carter's Hill	Berkshire	51.41°N 00.90°W	SU7669
Carterspiece	Gloucestershire	51.82°N 02.59°W	SO5914
Carterton	Oxfordshire	51.75°N 01.59°W	SP2806
Carterway Heads	Northumberland	54.85°N 01.93°W	NZ0451
Carthamartha	Cornwall	50.56°N 04.31°W	SX3677
Carthew (Treverbyn)	Cornwall	50.36°N 04.81°W	SX0055
Carthew (Wendron)	Cornwall	50.17°N 05.25°W	SW6836
Carthorpe	North Yorkshire	54.24°N 01.54°W	SE3083
Cartington	Northumberland	55.33°N 01.95°W	NU0304
Cartland	South Lanarkshire	55.69°N 03.81°W	NS8646
Cartledge	Derbyshire	53.28°N 01.52°W	SK3277
Cartmel	Cumbria	54.19°N 02.95°W	SD3878
Cartmel Fell	Cumbria	54.28°N 02.90°W	SD4188
Cartsdyke	Inverclyde	55.93°N 04.75°W	NS2875
Cartworth	Kirklees	53.55°N 01.79°W	SE1407
Carway	Carmarthenshire	51.73°N 04.23°W	SN4606
Carwinley	Cumbria	55.03°N 02.94°W	NY4072
Carwynnen	Cornwall	50.18°N 05.29°W	SW6537
Cary Fitzpaine	Somerset	51.04°N 02.65°W	ST5427
Carzield	Dumfries and Galloway	55.11°N 03.63°W	NX9681
Carzise	Cornwall	50.15°N 05.37°W	SW5934

=== Cas ===
Location	Locality	Coordinates (links to map & photo sources)	OS grid reference
Cascob	Powys	52.28°N 03.13°W	SO2366
Cas-Gwent (Chepstow)	Monmouthshire	51.63°N 02.68°W	ST5393
Cashes Green	Gloucestershire	51.74°N 02.26°W	SO8205
Cashlie	Perth and Kinross	56.53°N 04.47°W	NN4841
Cashmoor	Dorset	50.91°N 02.04°W	ST9713
Caskieberran	Fife	56.18°N 03.21°W	NO2500
Casnewydd (Newport)	City of Newport	51.58°N 02.99°W	ST3188
Cassey Compton	Gloucestershire	51.83°N 01.94°W	SP0415
Cassington	Oxfordshire	51.78°N 01.34°W	SP4510
Cassop	Durham	54.73°N 01.47°W	NZ3438
Castallack	Cornwall	50.07°N 05.56°W	SW4525
Castell	Denbighshire	53.20°N 03.33°W	SJ1168
Castell	Conwy	53.20°N 03.85°W	SH7669
Castell-Nedd (Neath)	Neath Port Talbot	51.65°N 03.82°W	SS7497
Castell-y-bwch	Torfaen	51.62°N 03.05°W	ST2792
Castell-y-rhingyll	Carmarthenshire	51.80°N 04.07°W	SN5714
Casterton	Cumbria	54.20°N 02.58°W	SD6279
Castle	Bedford	52.13°N 00.45°W	TL055495
Castle	Somerset	51.04°N 03.29°W	ST0928
Castle	Devon	50.80°N 02.95°W	ST3301
Castle Acre	Norfolk	52.70°N 00.67°E	TF8115
Castle Ashby	Northamptonshire	52.22°N 00.74°W	SP8659
Castlebay	Western Isles	56.95°N 07.49°W	NL6698
Castle Bolton	North Yorkshire	54.31°N 01.95°W	SE0391
Castle Bromwich	Birmingham	52.49°N 01.78°W	SP1589
Castle Bytham	Lincolnshire	52.75°N 00.54°W	SK9818
Castlebythe	Pembrokeshire	51.91°N 04.88°W	SN0228
Castle Caereinion	Powys	52.63°N 03.24°W	SJ1605
Castle Camps	Cambridgeshire	52.06°N 00.37°E	TL6343
Castle Carlton	Lincolnshire	53.32°N 00.08°E	TF3983
Castle Carrock	Cumbria	54.88°N 02.71°W	NY5455
Castle Cary	Somerset	51.08°N 02.52°W	ST6332
Castlecary	North Lanarkshire	55.98°N 03.95°W	NS7878
Castle Combe	Wiltshire	51.49°N 02.23°W	ST8477
Castlecraig	Scottish Borders	55.68°N 03.38°W	NT1344
Castlecroft	Wolverhampton	52.57°N 02.19°W	SO8797
Castle Donington	Leicestershire	52.83°N 01.34°W	SK4427
Castle Douglas	Dumfries and Galloway	54.93°N 03.93°W	NX7662
Castle Eaton	Swindon	51.65°N 01.79°W	SU1495
Castle Eden	Durham	54.72°N 01.34°W	NZ4237
Castle End	Cambridgeshire	52.65°N 00.34°W	TF1208
Castlefields	Cheshire	53.33°N 02.70°W	SJ5382
Castle Fields	Shropshire	52.71°N 02.74°W	SJ5013
Castleford	Wakefield	53.72°N 01.36°W	SE4225
Castle Frome	Herefordshire	52.10°N 02.49°W	SO6645
Castle Gate	Cornwall	50.15°N 05.51°W	SW4934
Castlegreen	Shropshire	52.49°N 03.00°W	SO3289
Castle Green	Barking and Dagenham	51.52°N 00.11°E	TQ4783
Castle Green	Surrey	51.33°N 00.62°W	SU9660
Castle Green	Barnsley	53.51°N 01.62°W	SE2502
Castle Gresley	Derbyshire	52.75°N 01.60°W	SK2718
Castlehead	Renfrewshire	55.83°N 04.44°W	NS4763
Castle Hedingham	Essex	51.98°N 00.59°E	TL7835
Castle Hill	Kent	51.15°N 00.41°E	TQ6942
Castle Hill	East Sussex	51.03°N 00.20°E	TQ5528
Castle Hill	Suffolk	52.07°N 01.13°E	TM1547
Castle Hill	Worcestershire	52.22°N 02.33°W	SO7759
Castlehill	Scottish Borders	55.60°N 03.25°W	NT2135
Castlehill	South Ayrshire	55.44°N 04.61°W	NS3520
Castle Hill	Stockport	53.43°N 02.12°W	SJ9293
Castlehill	West Dunbartonshire	55.95°N 04.59°W	NS3876
Castlehill	Perth and Kinross	56.45°N 03.18°W	NO2730
Castle Island	Perth and Kinross	56.20°N 03.39°W	NO137017
Castle Kennedy	Dumfries and Galloway	54.89°N 04.96°W	NX1059
Castlemartin	Pembrokeshire	51.64°N 05.02°W	SR9198
Castlemilk	Dumfries and Galloway	55.08°N 03.33°W	NY1577
Castlemilk	City of Glasgow	55.79°N 04.23°W	NS6058
Castlemorris	Pembrokeshire	51.93°N 05.05°W	SM9031
Castlemorton	Worcestershire	52.03°N 02.30°W	SO7937
Castle O'er	Dumfries and Galloway	55.21°N 03.19°W	NY2492
Castlerigg	Cumbria	54.58°N 03.11°W	NY2822
Castle Rising	Norfolk	52.78°N 00.46°E	TF6624
Castleside	Durham	54.82°N 01.87°W	NZ0848
Castle Street	Calderdale	53.71°N 02.07°W	SD9524
Castlethorpe	Milton Keynes	52.08°N 00.84°W	SP7944
Castlethorpe	North Lincolnshire	53.55°N 00.52°W	SE9807
Castleton	Aberdeenshire	57.00°N 03.40°W	NO1591
Castleton	Angus	56.60°N 03.09°W	NO3346
Castleton	City of Newport	51.54°N 03.08°W	ST2583
Castleton	Derbyshire	53.33°N 01.77°W	SK1582
Castleton	North Yorkshire	54.46°N 00.95°W	NZ6808
Castleton	Perth and Kinross	56.29°N 03.73°W	NN9313
Castleton	Rochdale	53.58°N 02.18°W	SD8810
Castle Town	West Sussex	50.87°N 00.29°W	TQ2010
Castletown	Dorset	50.56°N 02.45°W	SY6874
Castletown	Highland	58.58°N 03.39°W	ND1967
Castletown	Sunderland	54.91°N 01.45°W	NZ3558
Castletown	Cumbria	54.66°N 02.77°W	NY5030
Castletown	Isle of Man	54.06°N 04.66°W	SC2667
Castletown	Cheshire	53.05°N 02.85°W	SJ4351
Castletown	Staffordshire	52.80°N 02.13°W	SJ9123
Castletump	Gloucestershire	51.95°N 02.42°W	SO7129
Castle-upon-Alun	The Vale Of Glamorgan	51.45°N 03.57°W	SS9174
Castle Vale	Birmingham	52.51°N 01.79°W	SP1491
Castleweary	Scottish Borders	55.31°N 02.94°W	NT4003
Castley	Leeds	53.90°N 01.60°W	SE2645
Castling's Heath	Suffolk	52.05°N 00.87°E	TL9743
Caston	Norfolk	52.53°N 00.87°E	TL9597
Castor	Cambridgeshire	52.56°N 00.34°W	TL1298
Caswell	Swansea	51.56°N 04.03°W	SS5987

=== Cat ===
Location	Locality	Coordinates (links to map & photo sources)	OS grid reference
Catacol	North Ayrshire	55.68°N 05.32°W	NR9149
Cat Bank	Cumbria	54.36°N 03.07°W	SD3097
Catbrain	South Gloucestershire	51.51°N 02.62°W	ST5780
Catbrook	Monmouthshire	51.71°N 02.72°W	SO5002
Catch	Flintshire	53.22°N 03.19°W	SJ2070
Catchall	Cornwall	50.08°N 05.59°W	SW4327
Catchems Corner	Solihull	52.38°N 01.63°W	SP2576
Catchems End	Worcestershire	52.37°N 02.30°W	SO7975
Catchgate	Durham	54.86°N 01.75°W	NZ1652
Catchory	Highland	58.49°N 03.28°W	ND2557
Catcleugh	Northumberland	55.32°N 02.41°W	NT7403
Catcliffe	Rotherham	53.38°N 01.36°W	SK4288
Catcomb	Wiltshire	51.48°N 02.00°W	SU0076
Catcott	Somerset	51.14°N 02.87°W	ST3939
Caterham	Surrey	51.27°N 00.09°W	TQ3355
Catfield	Norfolk	52.73°N 01.52°E	TG3821
Catfirth	Shetland Islands	60.26°N 01.22°W	HU4354
Catford	Lewisham	51.43°N 00.01°W	TQ3873
Catfoss	East Riding of Yorkshire	53.92°N 00.26°W	TA1448
Catforth	Lancashire	53.80°N 02.80°W	SD4735
Cathays	Cardiff	51.48°N 03.18°W	ST1877
Cathays Park	Cardiff	51.47°N 03.19°W	ST1776
Cathcart	City of Glasgow	55.81°N 04.26°W	NS5860
Cathedine	Powys	51.91°N 03.25°W	SO1425
Catherine-de-Barnes	Solihull	52.41°N 01.75°W	SP1780
Catherine Slack	Calderdale	53.74°N 01.86°W	SE0928
Catherington	Hampshire	50.92°N 01.01°W	SU6914
Catherston Leweston	Dorset	50.74°N 02.89°W	SY3794
Cat Hill	Barnsley	53.54°N 01.63°W	SE2405
Cathiron	Warwickshire	52.39°N 01.32°W	SP4678
Catholes	Cumbria	54.30°N 02.53°W	SD6590
Cathpair	Scottish Borders	55.70°N 02.86°W	NT4646
Catisfield	Hampshire	50.85°N 01.23°W	SU5406
Catley Lane Head	Rochdale	53.63°N 02.19°W	SD8715
Catley Southfield	Herefordshire	52.09°N 02.46°W	SO6844
Catlodge	Highland	56.99°N 04.25°W	NN6392
Catlowdy	Cumbria	55.07°N 02.86°W	NY4576
Catmere End	Essex	52.02°N 00.17°E	TL4939
Catmore	Berkshire	51.51°N 01.35°W	SU4580
Caton	Devon	50.52°N 03.72°W	SX7871
Caton	Lancashire	54.07°N 02.71°W	SD5364
Caton Green	Lancashire	54.07°N 02.70°W	SD5465
Catrine	East Ayrshire	55.49°N 04.34°W	NS5225
Cat's Ash	City of Newport	51.60°N 02.91°W	ST3790
Cat's Common	Norfolk	52.75°N 01.46°E	TG3423
Cats Edge	Staffordshire	53.06°N 02.07°W	SJ9552
Catsfield	East Sussex	50.89°N 00.44°E	TQ7213
Catsfield Stream	East Sussex	50.89°N 00.43°E	TQ7113
Catsgore	Somerset	51.02°N 02.71°W	ST5025
Catsham	Somerset	51.09°N 02.64°W	ST5533
Catshaw	Barnsley	53.52°N 01.69°W	SE2003
Catshill	Worcestershire	52.35°N 02.07°W	SO9573
Catshill	Walsall	52.64°N 01.92°W	SK0505
Cat's Hill Cross	Staffordshire	52.86°N 02.26°W	SJ8230
Catslackburn	Scottish Borders	55.51°N 03.04°W	NT3425
Catslip	Oxfordshire	51.56°N 00.99°W	SU7086
Catstree	Shropshire	52.56°N 02.38°W	SO7496
Cattal	North Yorkshire	53.98°N 01.33°W	SE4454
Cattawade	Suffolk	51.95°N 01.05°E	TM1033
Cattedown	Devon	50.35°N 04.12°W	SX4953
Catterall	Lancashire	53.87°N 02.77°W	SD4942
Catterick	North Yorkshire	54.36°N 01.63°W	SE2497
Catterick Bridge	North Yorkshire	54.38°N 01.66°W	SE2299
Catterlen	Cumbria	54.68°N 02.80°W	NY4833
Catterline	Aberdeenshire	56.89°N 02.23°W	NO8678
Catterton	North Yorkshire	53.89°N 01.22°W	SE5145
Catteshall	Surrey	51.18°N 00.59°W	SU9844
Catthorpe	Leicestershire	52.39°N 01.19°W	SP5578
Cattistock	Dorset	50.78°N 02.58°W	SY5999
Cattle End	Northamptonshire	52.08°N 01.03°W	SP6643
Catton	Northumberland	54.90°N 02.28°W	NY8257
Catton	North Yorkshire	54.19°N 01.43°W	SE3778
Catwick	East Riding of Yorkshire	53.88°N 00.28°W	TA1345
Catworth	Cambridgeshire	52.34°N 00.41°W	TL0873

=== Cau-Caz ===
Location	Locality	Coordinates (links to map & photo sources)	OS grid reference
Caudle Green	Gloucestershire	51.78°N 02.08°W	SO9410
Caudlesprings	Norfolk	52.57°N 00.86°E	TF9401
Caulcott	Bedfordshire	52.06°N 00.55°W	SP9942
Caulcott	Oxfordshire	51.91°N 01.27°W	SP5024
Cauld	Scottish Borders	55.41°N 02.80°W	NT4914
Cauldcoats Holdings	Falkirk	55.99°N 03.55°W	NT0379
Cauldhame	Stirling	56.11°N 04.18°W	NS6494
Cauldmill	Scottish Borders	55.42°N 02.74°W	NT5315
Cauldon	Staffordshire	53.03°N 01.89°W	SK0749
Cauldon Lowe	Staffordshire	53.02°N 01.88°W	SK0847
Cauldwells	Aberdeenshire	57.59°N 02.35°W	NJ7956
Caulkerbush	Dumfries and Galloway	54.89°N 03.68°W	NX9257
Caulside	Dumfries and Galloway	55.11°N 02.87°W	NY4480
Caundle Marsh	Dorset	50.91°N 02.47°W	ST6713
Caunsall	Worcestershire	52.42°N 02.22°W	SO8581
Caunton	Nottinghamshire	53.13°N 00.89°W	SK7460
Causamul	Western Isles	57.60°N 07.59°W	NF660706
Causeway (Petersfield)	Hampshire	50.99°N 00.94°W	SU7422
Causeway (Horndean)	Hampshire	50.90°N 01.01°W	SU6912
Causeway	Monmouthshire	51.57°N 02.82°W	ST4386
Causeway End (Haverthwaite)	Cumbria	54.24°N 03.01°W	SD3484
Causeway End (Levens)	Cumbria	54.25°N 02.79°W	SD4885
Causeway End	Essex	51.84°N 00.43°E	TL6819
Causewayend	South Lanarkshire	55.60°N 03.54°W	NT0336
Causeway End	Wiltshire	51.55°N 02.00°W	SU0084
Causeway Foot	Calderdale	53.77°N 01.89°W	SE0731
Causeway Foot	Kirklees	53.60°N 01.71°W	SE1912
Causeway Green	Sandwell	52.48°N 02.01°W	SO9987
Causewayhead	Stirling	56.13°N 03.93°W	NS8095
Causewaywood	Shropshire	52.57°N 02.70°W	SO5298
Causey	Durham	54.89°N 01.68°W	NZ2056
Causey Park Bridge	Northumberland	55.24°N 01.71°W	NZ1894
Caute	Devon	50.86°N 04.23°W	SS4310
Cautley	Cumbria	54.35°N 02.47°W	SD6995
Cava	Orkney Islands	58.87°N 03.17°W	ND326995
Cavendish	Suffolk	52.08°N 00.62°E	TL8046
Cavendish Bridge	Leicestershire	52.85°N 01.34°W	SK4429
Cavenham	Suffolk	52.29°N 00.57°E	TL7669
Cavers Carre	Scottish Borders	55.52°N 02.71°W	NT5526
Caversfield	Oxfordshire	51.92°N 01.15°W	SP5825
Caversham	Berkshire	51.46°N 00.97°W	SU7175
Caversham Heights	Berkshire	51.46°N 00.99°W	SU7075
Caverswall	Staffordshire	52.97°N 02.07°W	SJ9542
Cawdor	Highland	57.51°N 03.93°W	NH8449
Cawkeld	East Riding of Yorkshire	53.93°N 00.49°W	SE9950
Cawkwell	Lincolnshire	53.29°N 00.08°W	TF2879
Cawood	North Yorkshire	53.82°N 01.13°W	SE5737
Cawsand	Cornwall	50.32°N 04.20°W	SX4350
Cawston	Warwickshire	52.35°N 01.31°W	SP4773
Cawston	Norfolk	52.76°N 01.15°E	TG1323
Cawthorne	North Yorkshire	54.29°N 00.81°W	SE7789
Cawthorne	Barnsley	53.55°N 01.57°W	SE2807
Cawthorpe	Lincolnshire	52.78°N 00.38°W	TF0922
Cawton	North Yorkshire	54.17°N 01.02°W	SE6476
Caxton	Cambridgeshire	52.20°N 00.09°W	TL3058
Caynham	Shropshire	52.35°N 02.67°W	SO5473
Caythorpe	Lincolnshire	53.02°N 00.61°W	SK9348
Caythorpe	Nottinghamshire	52.99°N 00.98°W	SK6845
Cayton	North Yorkshire	54.23°N 00.39°W	TA0583
