= Caroe (disambiguation) =

Caroe may refer to:

- W. D. Caröe (1857–1938), British architect.
- Martin Caroe (1933−1999), British conservation architect.
- Olaf Caroe (1892–1981), administrator in British India.
- Alban Caroe (1904−1991), British architect.
- Athelstan Caroe (1903-1988), grain merchant.
- Caroe, hamlet in Otterham, Cornwall, England.
