= Saltash North (electoral division) =

Former electoral division of Cornwall in the UK

- Former ward Cornwall Council
- Boundary of Saltash North in Cornwall from 2013-2021.
- County: Cornwall

2013–2021
- Number of councillors: One
- Replaced by: Saltash Tamar; Saltash Trematon and Landrake
- Created from: Saltash St Stephens

Saltash North (Cornish: Essa North) was an electoral division of Cornwall in the United Kingdom which returned one member to sit on Cornwall Council between 2013 and 2021. It was abolished at the 2021 local elections, being succeeded by Saltash Tamar and Saltash Trematon and Landrake.

== Councillors ==
Election	Member	Party
2013	Joe Ellison	Independent
2017	Sheila Lennox-Boyd	Conservative
2021	Seat abolished	

== Extent ==
Saltash North represented the north of the town of Saltash, including the suburb of Burraton and part of the suburb of South Pill (which was shared with the Saltash East division), as well as the hamlet of Carkeel. The division covered 453 hectares in total.

== Election results ==
=== 2017 election ===
2017 election: Saltash North
Party	Candidate	Votes	%	±%
Conservative	Sheila Lennox-Boyd	542	47.6	New
Liberal Democrats	Christopher Cook	328	28.8	▼3.9
Independent	John Brady	263	23.1	▲2.0
Majority		214	18.8	N/A
Rejected ballots		5	0.4	▼0.7
Turnout		1138	36.1	▲10.5
Conservative gain from Independent		Swing		

=== 2013 election ===
2013 election: Saltash North
Party	Candidate	Votes	%	±%
Independent	Joe Ellison	372	45.1	
Liberal Democrats	Denise Watkins	270	32.7	
Independent	John Brady	174	21.1	
Majority		102	12.4	
Rejected ballots		9	1.1	
Turnout		825	25.6	
Independent win (new seat)				
