= Saltash East (electoral division) =

Former electoral division of Cornwall in the UK

- Former ward Cornwall Council
- Boundary of Saltash East in Cornwall from 2013-2021.
- County: Cornwall

2013–2021
- Number of councillors: One
- Replaced by: Saltash Tamar
- Created from: Saltash Pill

Saltash East (Cornish: Essa Est) was an electoral division of Cornwall in the United Kingdom which returned one member to sit on Cornwall Council between 2013 and 2021. It was abolished at the 2021 local elections, being succeeded by Saltash Tamar.

== Councillors ==
Election	Member	Party
2013	Derek Holley	Independent
2017	Derek Holley	Independent
2021	Seat abolished	

== Extent ==
Saltash East represented the east of the town of Saltash, including Saltash station, the Tamar Bridge, and part of the suburb of South Pill (which was shared with the Saltash North division). The division covered 204 hectares in total.

== Election results ==
=== 2017 election ===
2017 election: Saltash East
Party	Candidate	Votes	%	±%
Independent	Derek Holley	575	45.8	▼34.4
Liberal Democrats	Richard Bickford	391	31.1	▲24.5
Conservative	Peter Samuels	282	22.5	▲9.7
Majority		293	23.3	▼44.1
Rejected ballots		8	0.6	▲0.2
Turnout		1256	38.9	▲6.6
Independent hold		Swing		

=== 2013 election ===
2013 election: Saltash East
Party	Candidate	Votes	%	±%
Independent	Derek Holley	870	80.2	
Conservative	David Ward	139	12.8	
Liberal Democrats	James Shepherd	72	6.6	
Majority		731	67.4	
Rejected ballots		4	0.4	
Turnout		1085	32.3	
Independent win (new seat)				
