= Harborough Magna =

Village in Warwickshire, England

Coordinates: 52.408975°N 1.298104°W

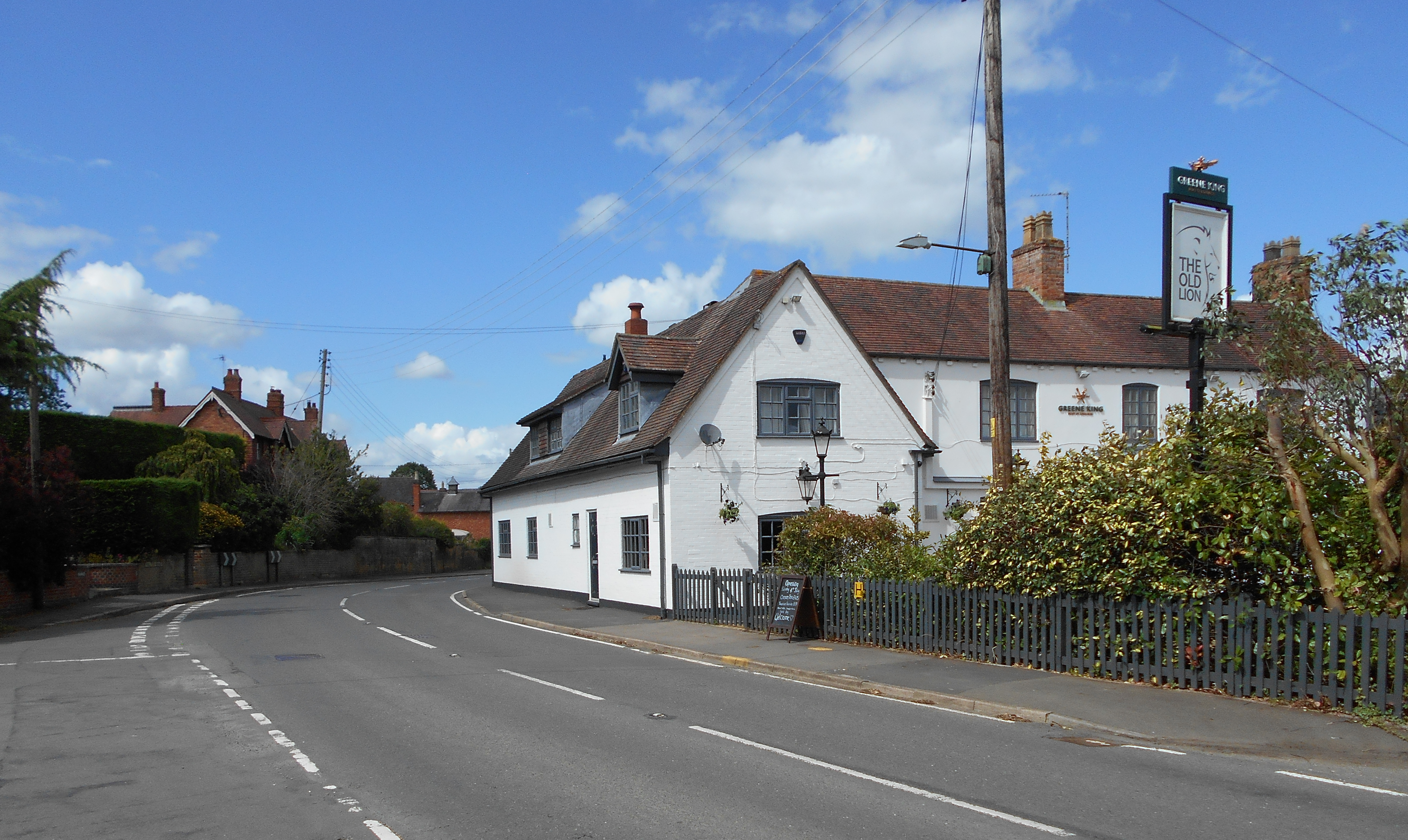
- The Old Lion at Harborough Magna

- Location within Warwickshire
- Population: 481 (2021 census)
- OS grid reference: SP4779
- Civil parish: Harborough Magna
- District: Rugby
- Shire county: Warwickshire
- Region: West Midlands
- Country: England
- Sovereign state: United Kingdom
- Post town: RUGBY
- Postcode district: CV23
- Dialling code: 01788
- Police: Warwickshire
- Fire: Warwickshire
- Ambulance: West Midlands
- UK Parliament: Rugby

Harborough Magna is a village and civil parish in the Rugby district, in the county of Warwickshire, England. The civil parish which also contains the nearby hamlets of Harborough Parva and Cathiron, had a population of 502 at the 2011 Census, decreasing to 481 at the 2021 Census.

Harborough Magna is located around four miles northwest of Rugby on the B4112 road. The M6 motorway lies about one mile north of the village, and the Oxford Canal about one mile south. Harborough Magna was to be the site of a motorway service station, first planned in 1975, on the M6 (the partially constructed slip roads are visible between the B4112 and Montilo Lane bridges), but the allocated site was too small, and the plans were scrapped in 1980.

Harborough Magna was mentioned in the Domesday Book as Herdeberge. For many years the main source of employment in the village were sawmills near the canal at Cathiron. The village has a mixture of old and modern housing. There are a number of old houses in the village, some dating to the 17th century, and a pub known as the Old Lion (formerly known as the Golden Lion) which dates from the 18th century, and which was rebuilt following a fire in 1986. There is a village church dedicated to All Saints.

The hamlet of Harborough Parva, a short distance to the south of Harborough Magna, was historically a separate settlement, which was within the parish of Newbold-on-Avon until 1931. The two Harboroughs are now adjoined, and practically form a single entity.

Around one mile north-east of the village, within the parish is the St Mary's nursing home for the elderly. It was originally built in 1912 as an isolation hospital. Despite its remote location, between 1949 and 1983 it was a maternity hospital, and served as the only one in the Rugby area until this service was moved to St Cross Hospital.
