= Listed buildings in Nicholforest =

Nicholforest is a civil parish in the Cumberland district of Cumbria, England. It contains seven listed buildings that are recorded in the National Heritage List for England. Of these, one is listed at Grade II*, the middle of the three grades, and the others are at Grade II, the lowest grade. The parish is almost entirely rural, and the listed buildings consist of a country house that originated as a tower house, an outbuilding associated with it, a farmhouse and a barn, a milestone, a church, and a monument.

== Key ==
Grade	Criteria
II*	Particularly important buildings of more than special interest
II	Buildings of national importance and special interest

== Buildings ==
Name and location	Photograph	Date	Notes	Grade
Stonegarthside Hall; 55.12834°N 2.81641°W		Late 13th century	Originally a tower house, with wings added in 1682, it is a country house in Scottish Baronial style. The house is built in large blocks of grey sandstone and calciferous sandstone on projecting plinth stones. It has shaped quoins, stepped gables, and a Welsh slate roof. There are three storeys and numerous bays. The ranges are on three sides, enclosing a courtyard that was previously part of the house, closed by a curtain wall. The former entrance in this wall has a moulded architrave, a pulvinated frieze, a moulded cornice, and a battlemented parapet with ball finials at the ends. The windows in the wings are sashes.	II*
Old Hall Farmhouse; 55.10285°N 2.86162°W	—	Late 17th century	The farmhouse was extended in the early 19th century. It is in sandstone and has a Welsh slate roof. There are two storeys and three bays, with a two-bay extension. On the front is a gabled porch, and 19th-century windows replace the original mullioned windows. There is also a fire window and a similar blocked window above.	II
Barn, Old Hall Farm; 55.10269°N 2.86162°W	—	Late 18th century	The barn is in sandstone with a Welsh slate roof, and is in a single storey. It contains a large cart entrance, and ventilation slits in two levels.	II
Milestone; 55.06318°N 2.90780°W	—	Early 19th century	The milestone was provided for the Longtown to Penton road. It is in sandstone and consists of a squared stone with a rounded top carrying a circular cast iron plate indicating the distance in miles to Carlisle. On the top is a bench mark.	II
Outbuilding, Stonegarthside Hall; 55.12789°N 2.81675°W		Early 19th century	Originally a barn, it is in calciferous sandstone with a Welsh slate roof. The building has a single storey with a loft, and an arcade of eight bays. At the rear is a square-headed cart entrance.	II
St Nicholas' Church; 55.09295°N 2.85575°W		1866–67	The church, designed by Alexander Graham, is in sandstone, and has a roof with bands of blue and purple slate and crested tiles on the ridge. It consists of a nave with an open timber south porch, a lower chancel with an apsidal east end, and a north transept with a lean-to vestry in the angle with the chancel. Over the west bay is a timber bellcote with a slated spirelet.	II
Monument; 55.09974°N 2.80175°W	—	1891	The monument is inscribed and commemorates William Forster, a gamekeeper who was shot by a poacher. It has a stepped plinth in calciferous sandstone, a shaft in polished Dalbeattie granite, and a tall tapering column in calciferous sandstone. Around it is a low wall with cast iron speared railings.	
