= Nicholforest =

Civil parish in Cumbria, England

Coordinates: 55.0925°N 2.857°W

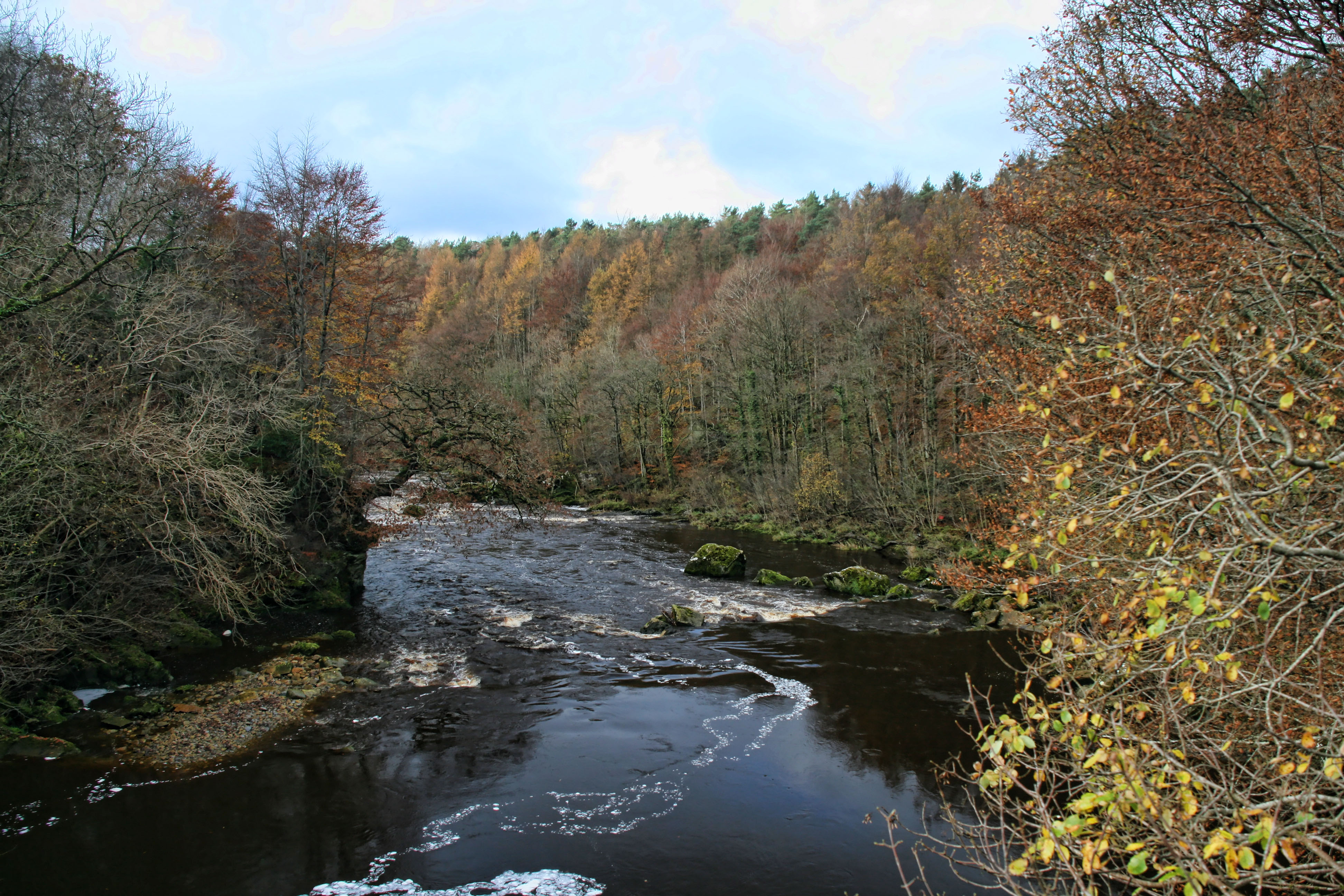
- Liddel Water at Penton Bridge

- Location within Cumbria
- Population: 347 (Parish, 2021)
- Language: English; Cumbrian dialect
- OS grid reference: NY 454 779
- Civil parish: Nicholforest
- Unitary authority: Cumberland
- Ceremonial county: Cumbria
- Region: North West
- Country: England
- Sovereign state: United Kingdom
- Post town: CARLISLE
- Postcode district: CA6
- Dialling code: 01228
- Police: Cumbria
- Fire: Cumbria
- Ambulance: North West
- UK Parliament: Carlisle

Nicholforest is a civil parish in the Cumberland district of Cumbria, England. The parish lies immediately south of the border with Scotland, which follows the river called Liddel Water in this area. The parish is large and sparsely populated, containing extensive areas of woodland. Its settlements are generally small hamlets. At the 2021 census, the parish had a population of 347.

== Geography ==
The parish covers an area that extends about 10 miles (16 km) east to west and 2 miles (3 km) north to south. The area was once an extensive forest between England and Scotland. In 1870–72 John Marius Wilson's Imperial Gazetteer of England and Wales described the landscape as:

"The surface is hilly. The streams Kershope and Liddel here form several cascades."

Much of the woodland in the parish was managed for commercial forestry by the Forestry Commission.

Hamlets in the parish include Catlowdy, Penton, Kershopefoot, and Warwicksland.

== History ==
Being located on the border between England and Scotland historically caused social tensions. "Border Reivers were raiders along the Anglo–Scottish border from the late 13th century to the beginning of the 17th century. Their ranks consisted of both Scottish and English families, and they raided the entire border country without regard to their victims' nationality". As a result of this it has been documented that "There was fighting (or feuds) between families on the same side of the Border and across the border. Marriage across the Border could result in the death penalty but such unions did occur … regularly."

== Notable establishments ==
=== Church of St Nicholas ===
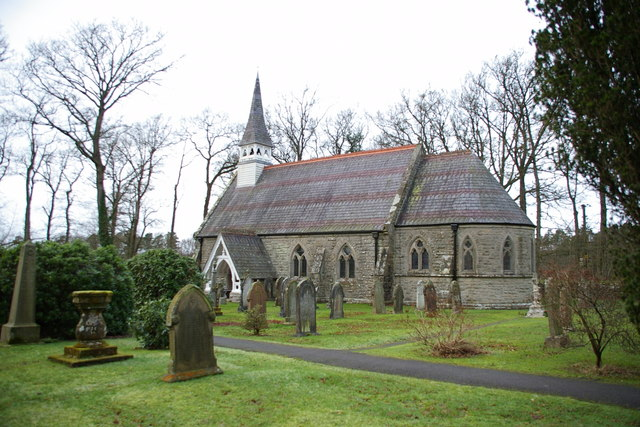
St Nicholas Church

St Nicholas' Church was built as a chapel of ease to the parish church of St Andrew's at Kirkandrews on Esk, 5 miles (8 km) to the south-west. The current St Nicholas' Church was designed by Alexander Graham and built in 1866–1867, replacing an earlier chapel. The building has a small wooden bell turret with a spire. The stained glass windows were made by John Scott & Son; a five-light east window depicts Christ the good Shepherd, flanked by the four evangelists.

=== Nicholforest Hall ===
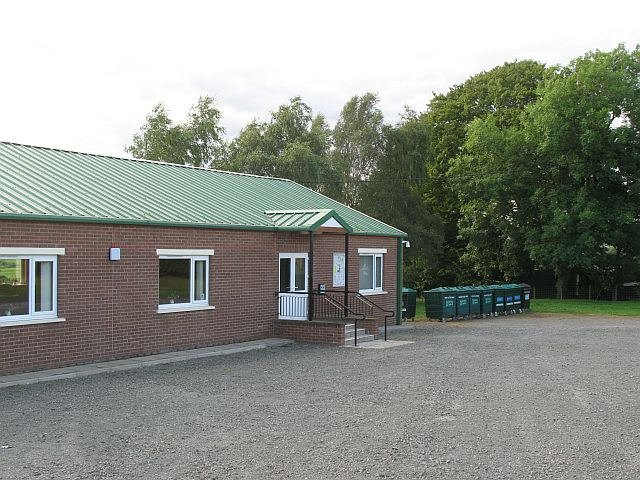
Nicholforest Hall: the village hall

The parish is served by a village hall called Nicholforest Hall at Warwicksland, which was built in 1964 to replace an earlier building destroyed by fire. The building is used by various community groups, including the Women's Institute, and is also used for a book drop library facility.

== Governance ==
There are two tiers of local government covering Nicholforest, at parish and unitary authority level: Nicholforest Parish Council and Cumberland Council. The parish council meets at the village hall, called Nicholforest Hall, in the hamlet of Warwicksland.

=== Administrative history ===
Nicholforest was historically a township in the ancient parish of Kirkandrews on Esk. The township took on civil functions under the poor laws from the 17th century onwards. As such, the township also became a civil parish in 1866, when the legal definition of 'parish' was changed to be the areas used for administering the poor laws.

== Demographics ==
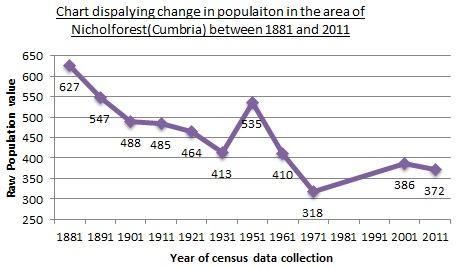
Graph showing change in population in Nicholforest, Cumbria, England from 1881–2011.

The parish had a population of 347 at the 2021 census. The population had been 372 at the 2011 census. This represented a population density of 0.1 persons per hectare, significantly lower than the average population density of England at 4.1 persons per hectare.

Since 1881, agriculture has been the dominant sector of employment in Nicholforest. In the 2011 census, it was followed by wholesale and retail trade.

== See also ==
- Listed buildings in Nicholforest
