= Carrick Castle =

Castle in Argyll and Bute, Scotland

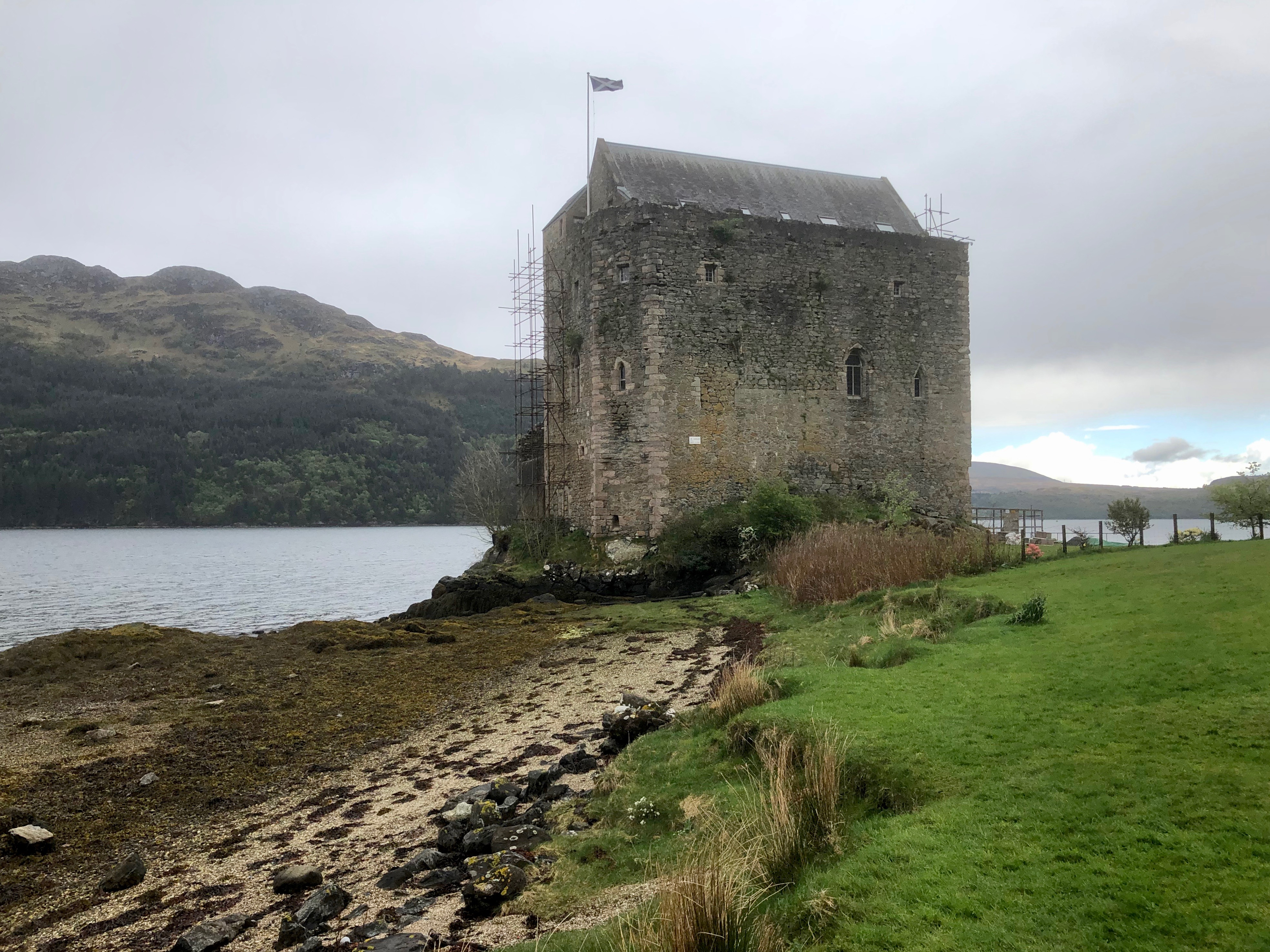
- Carrick Castle being restored, 2019
- Interactive map of the Carrick Castle area

General information
- Type: Tower House
- Location: Cowal Peninsula, Argyll and Bute., Carrick Castle (village), Scotland, United Kingdom
- Coordinates: 56.108742°N 4.9054980°W, National grid reference NS 19422 94469
- Construction started: 14th Century

Height
- Height: 64ft

Technical details
- Material: Stone
- Floor count: 2

Listed Building – Category A
- Official name: Carrick Castle
- Designated: 20 July 1971
- Reference no.: LB11815

Scheduled monument
- Official name: Carrick Castle
- Type: Secular: castle
- Designated: 28 September 1966
- Reference no.: SM2495

Carrick Castle is a 14th-century tower house on the west shore of Loch Goil on the Cowal Peninsula, in Argyll and Bute, west of Scotland. It is located between Cuilmuich and Carrick, 4 miles (6.4 km) south of Lochgoilhead.

The castle stands on a rocky peninsula, and was formerly defended to landward by a ditch and drawbridge. The building is around 66 by 38 feet (20 by 12 m), and up to 64 feet (20 m) high with walls seven feet thick. It consists of two floors above the central great hall and stands 64 feet high. There is a curiosity – a small chimney is built into a window recess. There is an appendage of a smaller 17th century structure to the original rectangular tower house. The structure has been designated a scheduled monument and a Category A listed building by Historic Environment Scotland.

Modern-day houses in the surrounding area take the name Carrick Castle.

== History ==
The castle was probably built by the Campbells in the last decades of the fourteenth century, at a point of time when the family was dominant in the area.

It was used as a hunting lodge by James IV. Mary, Queen of Scots visited in 1563, staying at the castle on 20 and 21 June.

During Argyll's Rising in 1685, when Archibald Campbell, 9th Earl of Argyll, attempted to overthrow King James VII, captain Thomas Hamilton of HMS Kingfisher reported that the castle had been burnt and walls reduced sufficiently to make it useless to the Campbell forces. Legend has it that the ship bombarded the castle, badly damaging the keep, which lost its roof.

The castle was intermittently occupied until it was sold to the Murrays, the Earls of Dunmore.

The keep was a ruin for many years but is now in private ownership and undergoing restoration.

== Gallery ==
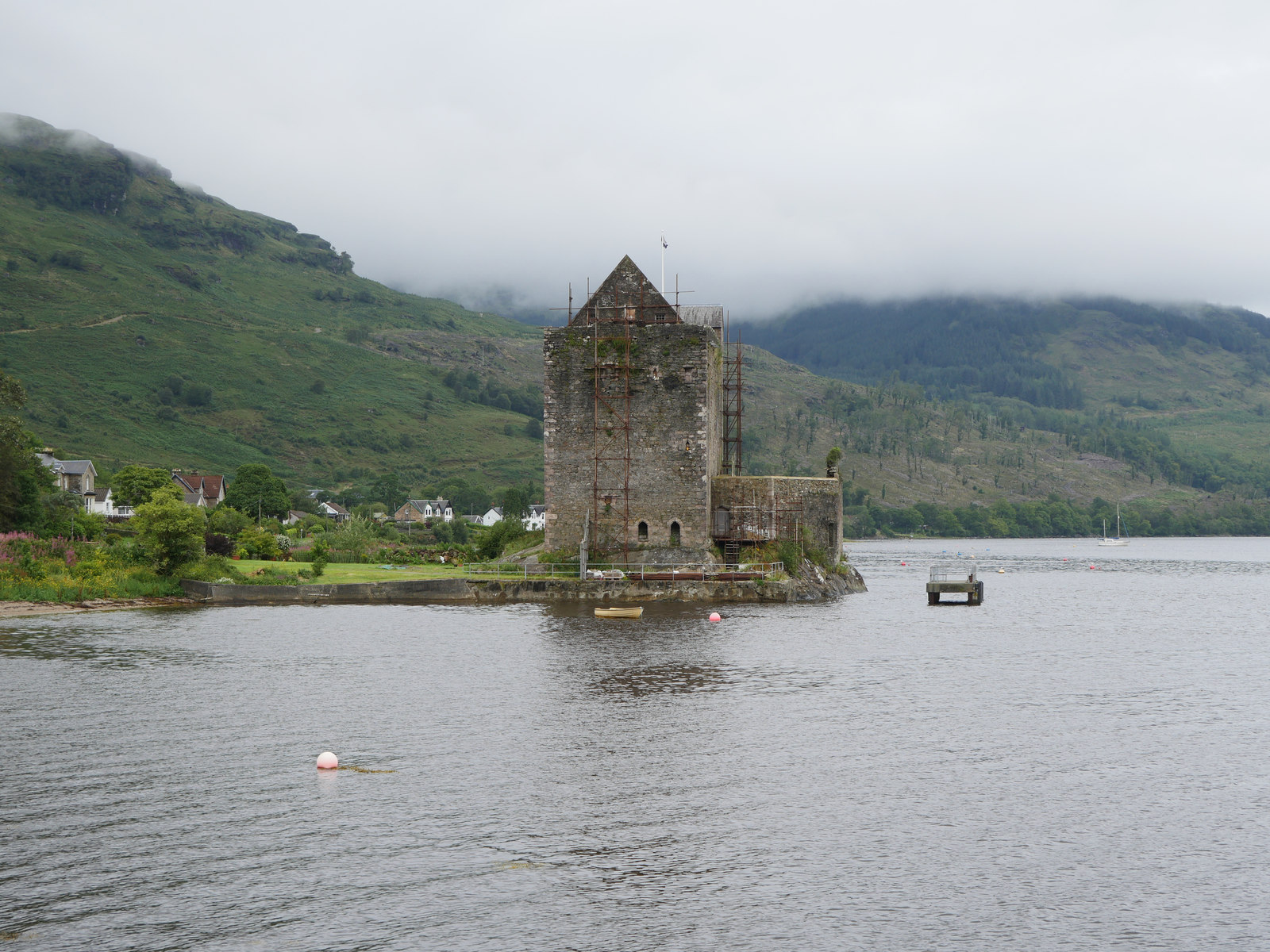
The castle in 2020

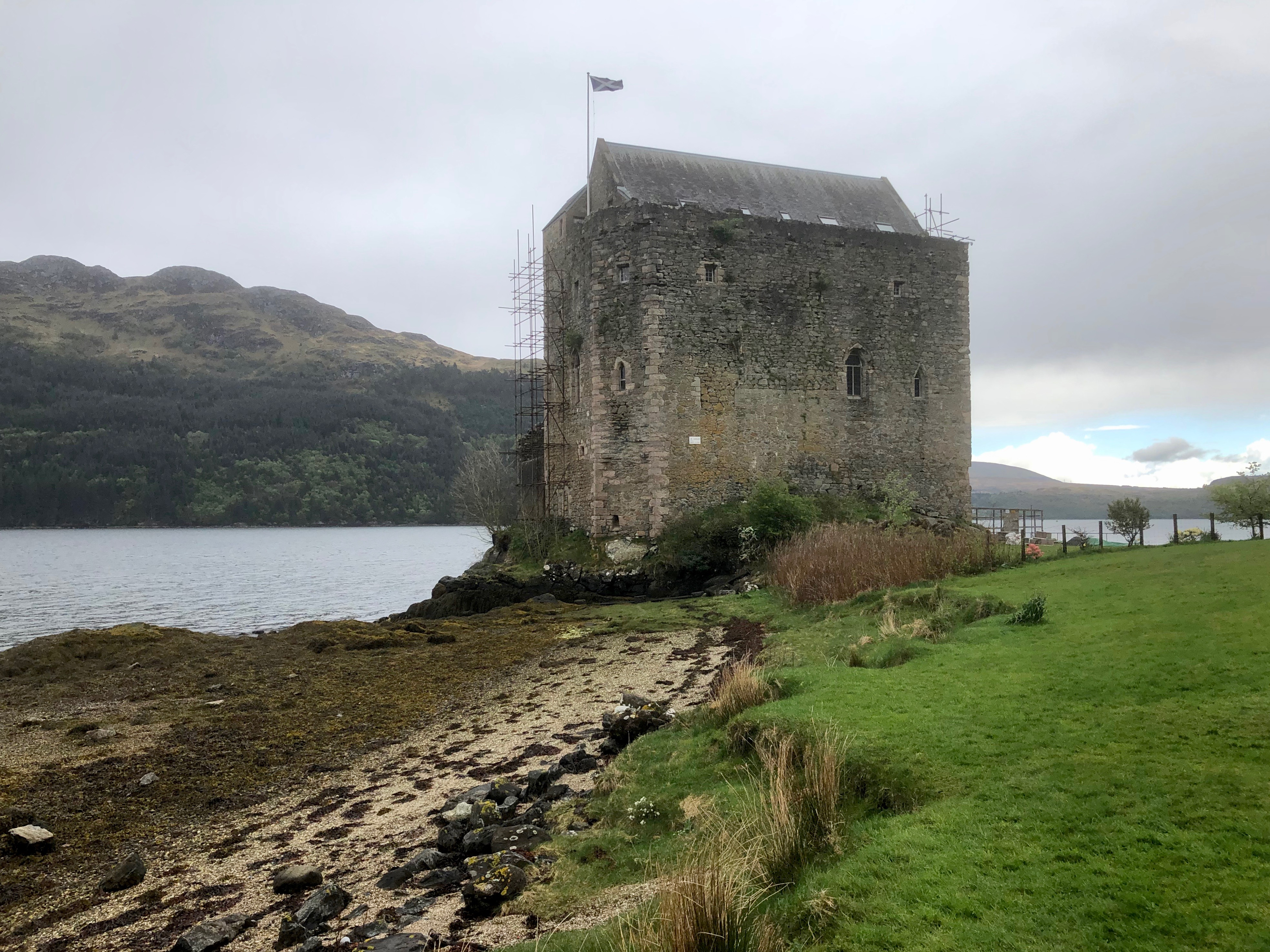
The castle in 2019

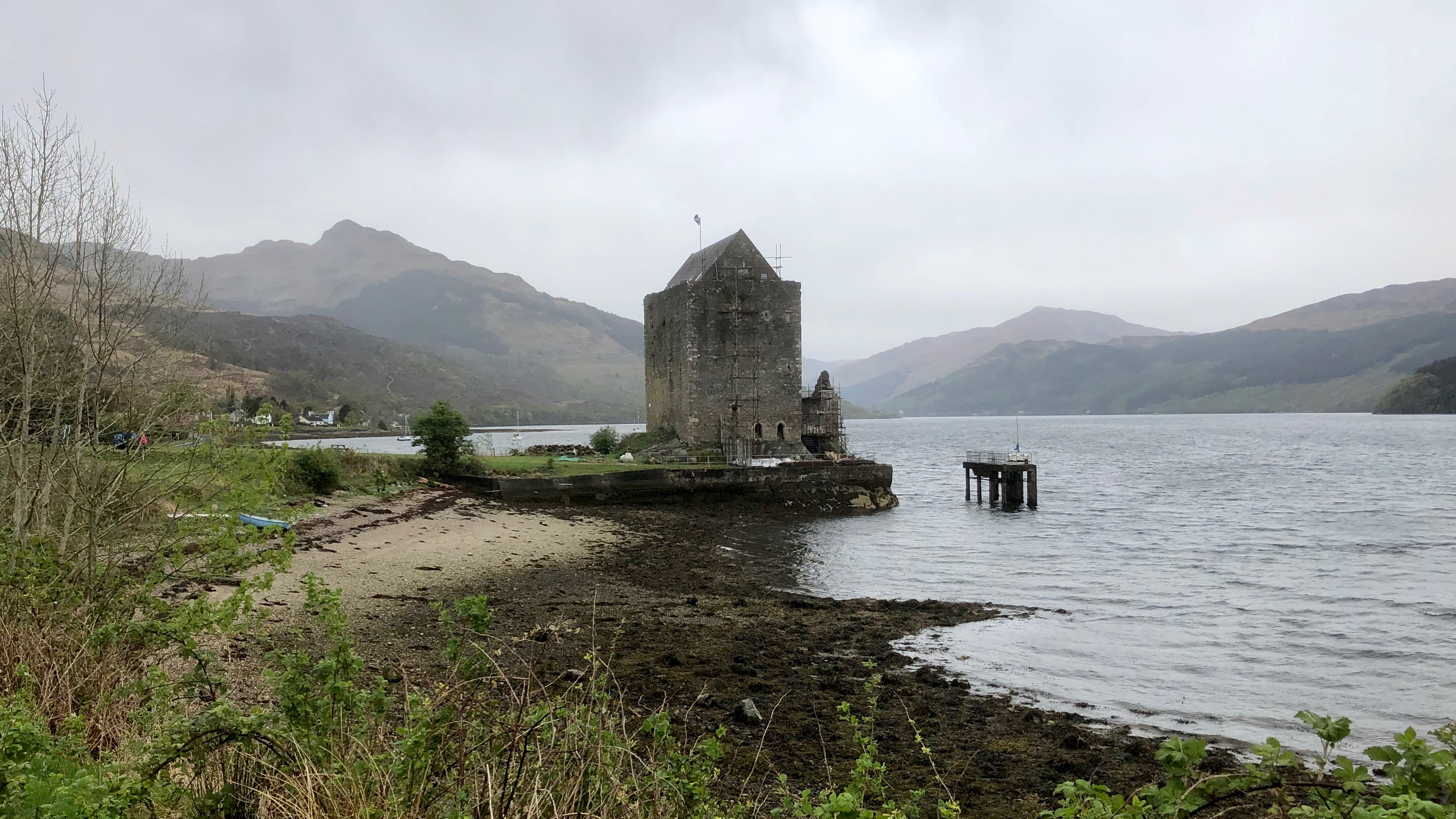
The castle in 2019

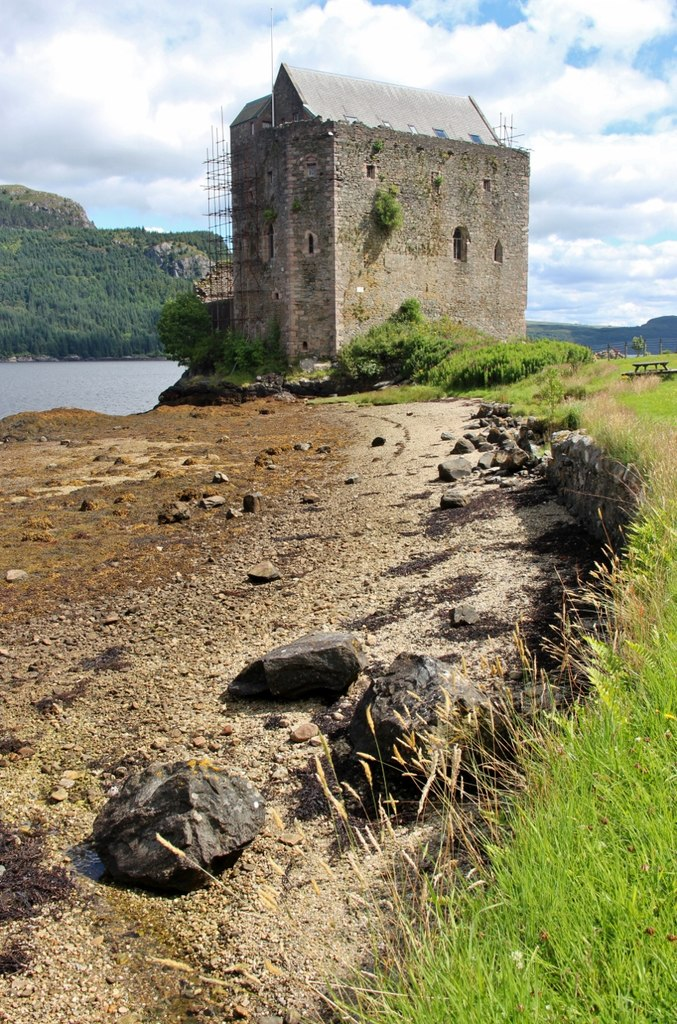
The castle in 2016

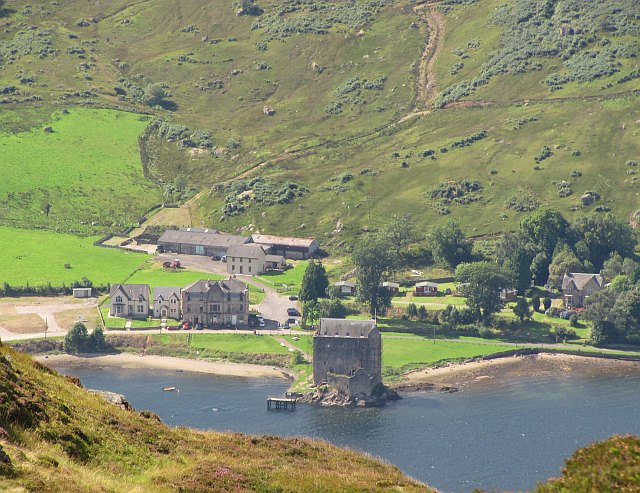
The castle in 2010

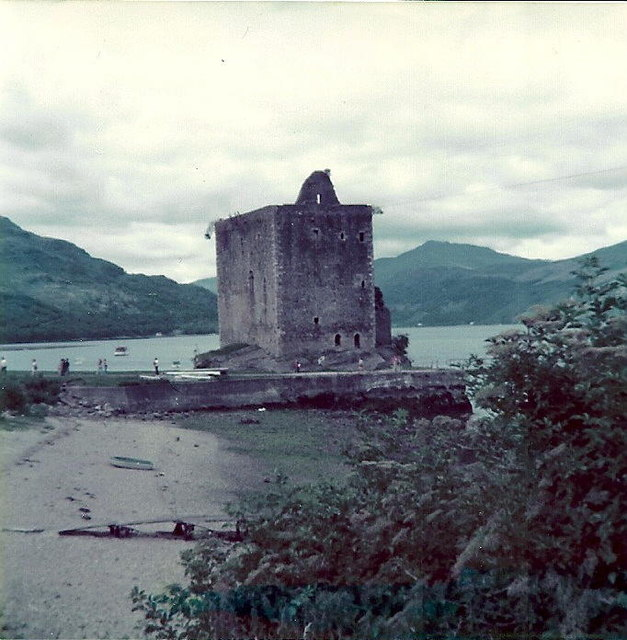
The castle in 1976

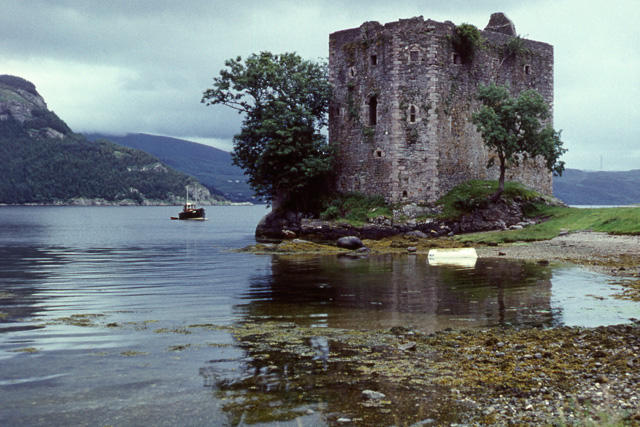
The castle in 1973

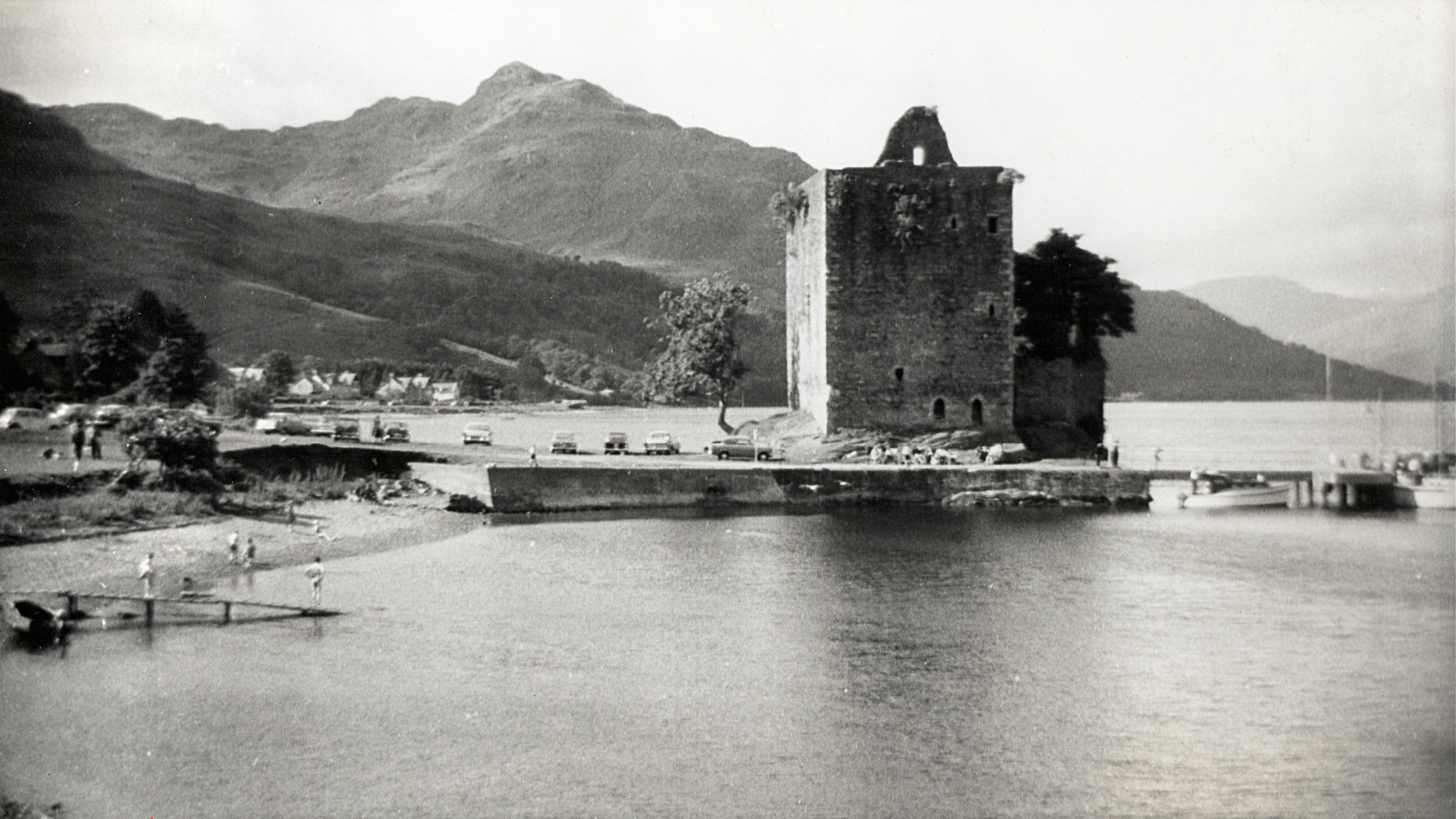
The castle in 1964

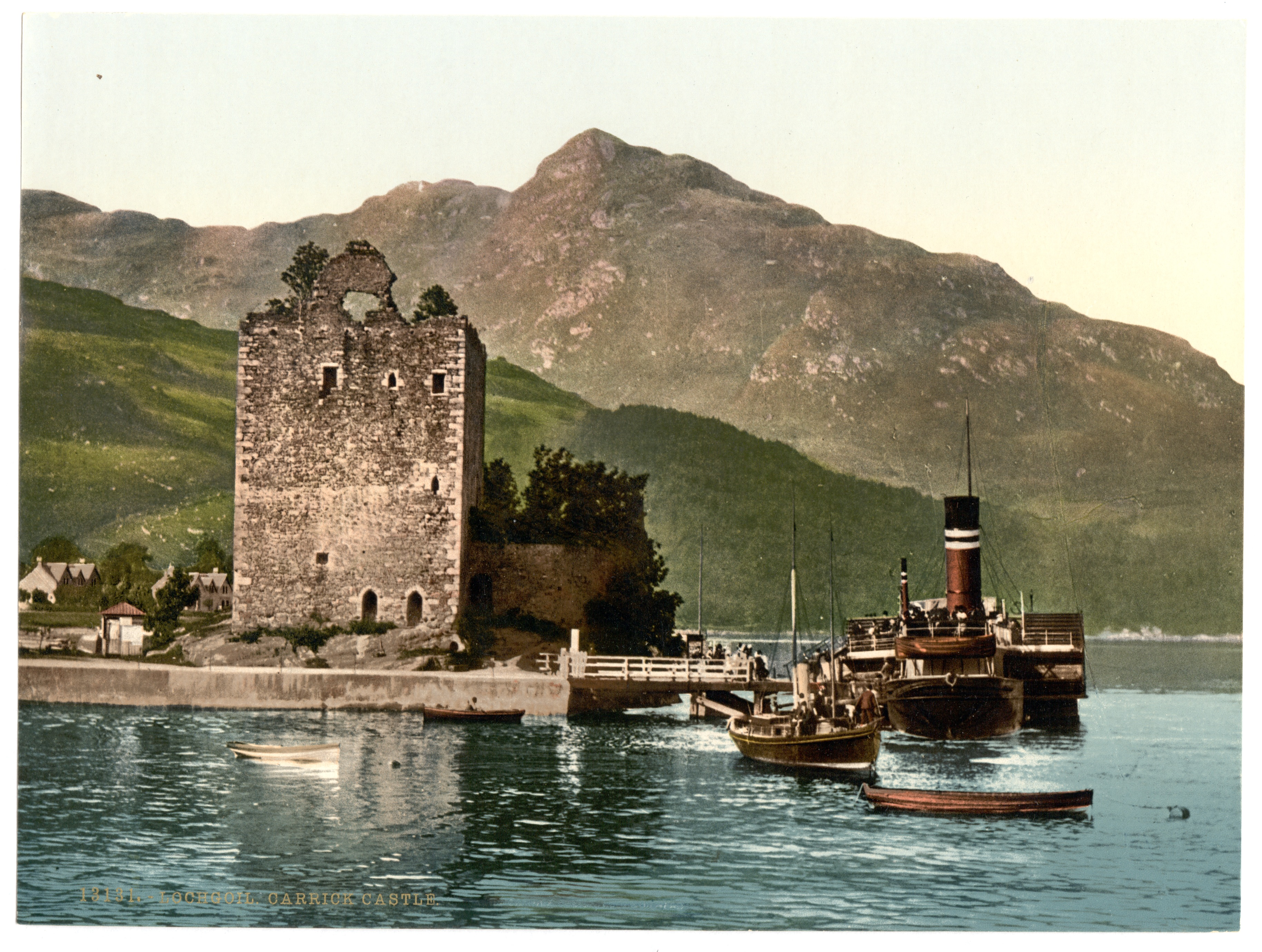
The castle between 1890 and 1900

== Bibliography ==
- Clark, Ruth (1921), Anthony Hamilton: his Life and Works and his Family, London: John Lane
- Ewart, Gordon; Baker, Fiona (1998). "Carrick Castle: symbol and source of Campbell power in south Argyll from the 14th to the 17th century" (PDF). Proceedings of the Society of Antiquaries of Scotland. 128: 937–1016.
