= Castallack Round =

Prehistoric site in Cornwall, England

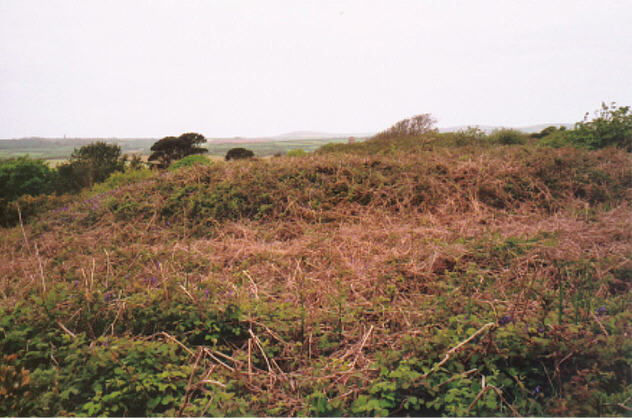
- Viewed from the south

- Location within Cornwall
- 50°4′26″N 5°34′7″W
- Type: Hillfort
- Periods: Iron Age
- Location: Near Castallack, Cornwall
- OS grid reference: SW 448 254

Scheduled monument
- Official name: Round, courtyard house, stone hut circle settlement and field system 275m north of Castallack Carn
- Designated: 29 September 1972
- Reference no.: 1004654

Castallack Round or Roundago is a prehistoric site near Castallack in Cornwall, England. It is a scheduled monument.

A "round" is a small circular embanked enclosure, with one entrance; they are common in Cornwall, and they date from the late Iron Age to the early post-Roman period.

== Description ==
The site is near the summit of a ridge overlooking the Lamorna valley. Part of the rampart survives; it is composed of large stones and slabs, height about 1.6 metres (5 ft 3 in) and width 1.8 metres (5 ft 11 in), forming an oval enclosure. There was originally a surrounding ditch. On the tithe map of 1840, the round is depicted as having a colonnade of stones leading from the entrance in the south to an inner circular enclosure; John Thomas Blight, describing it in 1865, found that these features had mostly disappeared.

To the north-west of the round there are thick stone walls, height up to 0.9 metres (2 ft 11 in): the remains of a structure with an internal diameter of about 7.5 metres (25 ft). This is interpreted as a courtyard house, a type of building that developed in west Cornwall from the 2nd to 4th centuries AD.
