= Carrick Castle (village) =

Village in Argyll and Bute, Scotland

Coordinates: 56.108936°N 4.9090839°W

Carrick Castle: Scottish Gaelic: Caisteal Carraig
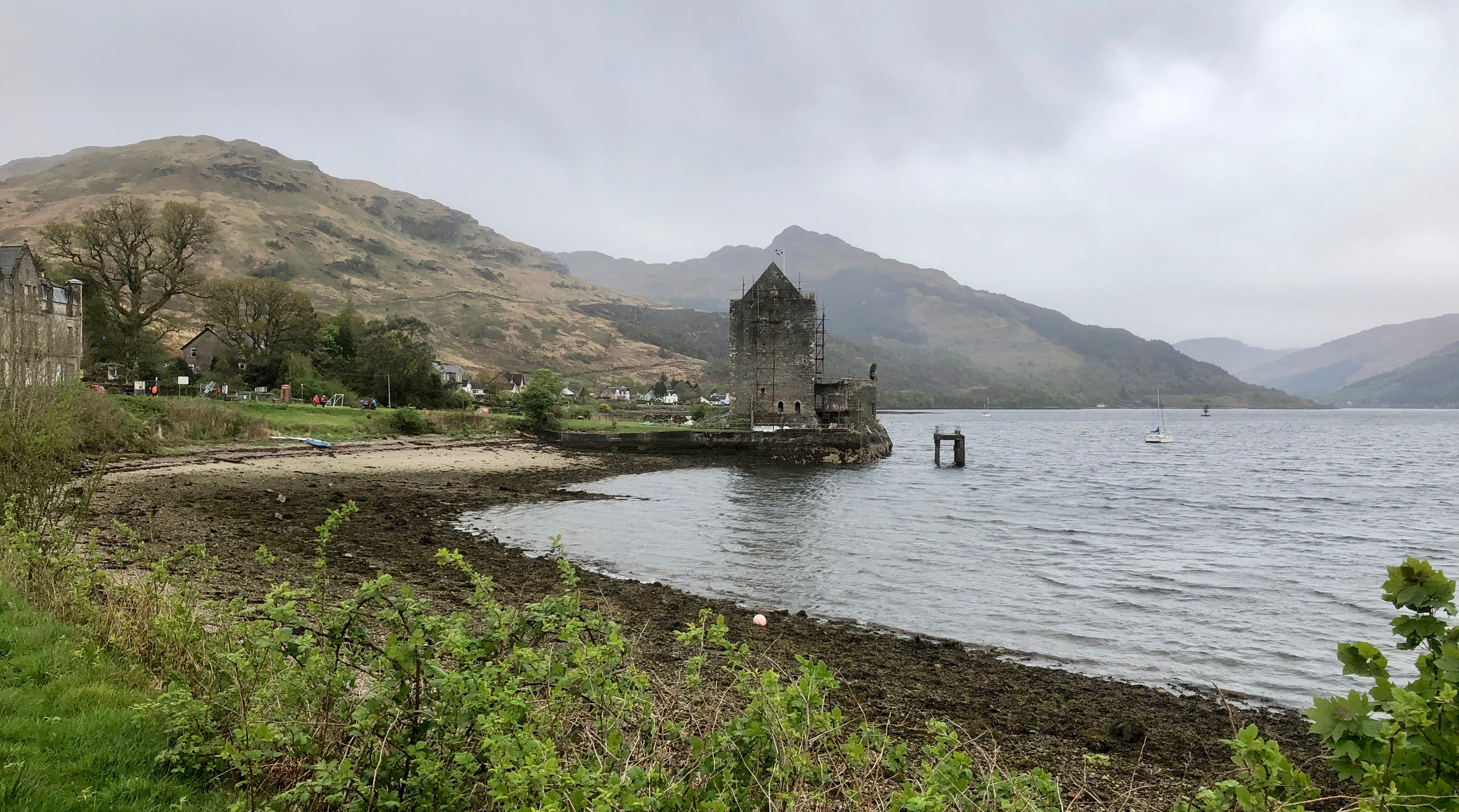
- Carrick Castle village, with tenement to left of tower house

- Location within Argyll and Bute
- OS grid reference: NS 19200 94500
- Council area: Argyll and Bute
- Lieutenancy area: Argyll and Bute
- Country: Scotland
- Sovereign state: United Kingdom
- Post town: CAIRNDOW
- Postcode district: PA24
- Dialling code: 01301
- UK Parliament: Argyll, Bute and South Lochaber
- Scottish Parliament: Argyll and Bute

Carrick Castle is a village on the western shore of Loch Goil, 4.3 miles (6.9 kilometres) south of Lochgoilhead in Argyll and Bute, Scotland. It is within both Argyll Forest Park and Loch Lomond and The Trossachs National Park.

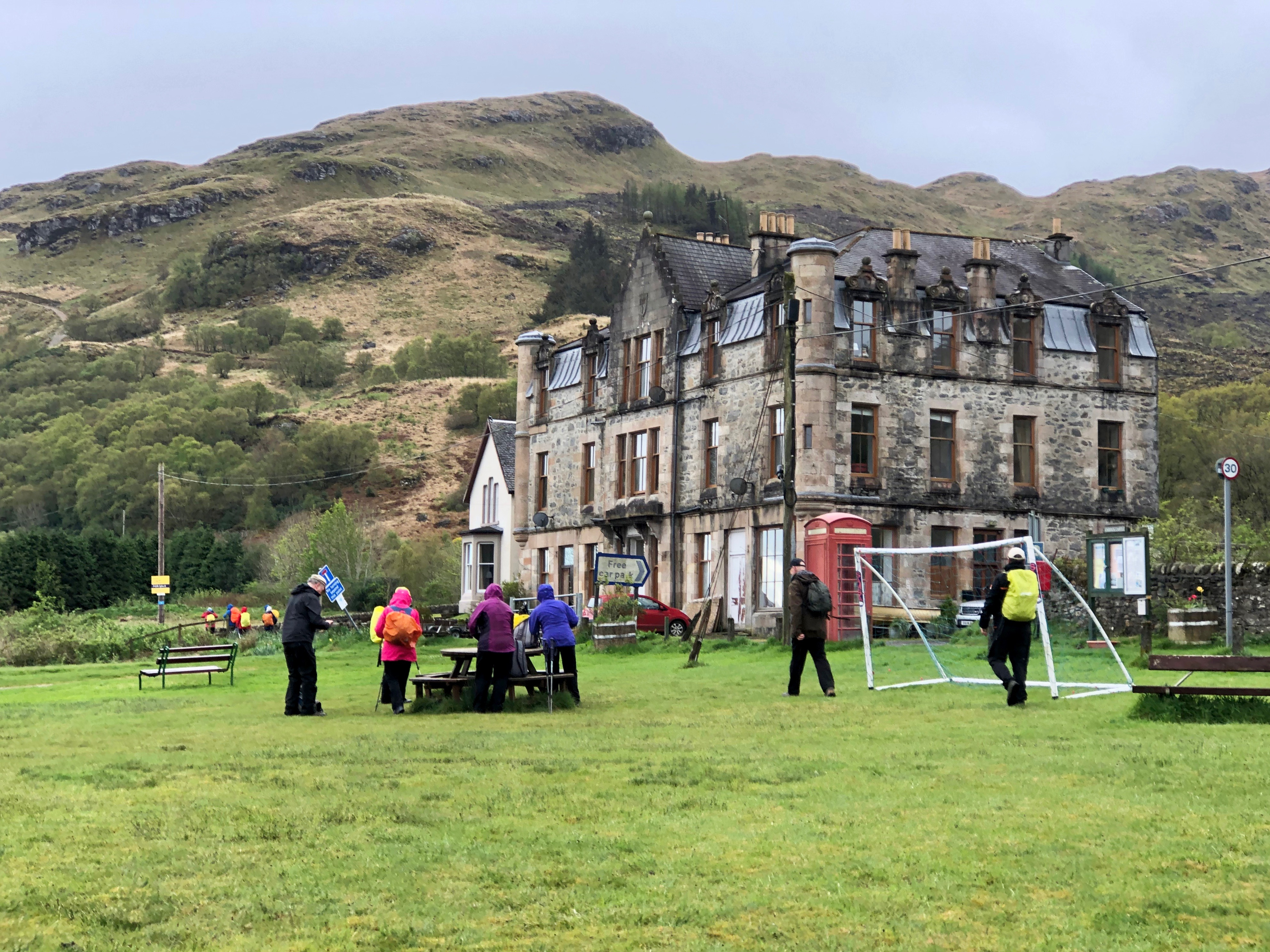
Carrick Castle village green, with Hillside Place tenement

In 1877, a wooden pier was built at the castle, and a three-storey tenement building called Hillside Place was constructed inland from the castle, to provide apartments for visiting tourists. This was followed by several villas built along the shore road as accommodation for Glasgow merchants, developing what became a small village.

The village church is listed on the buildings at risk register of Scotland.

There is a path to Ardentinny from Carrick Castle village.

== Carrick Castle tower house ==
Carrick Castle, a 15th-century castle built on a rock on the shoreline of Loch Goil, was originally a Clan Lamont stronghold.

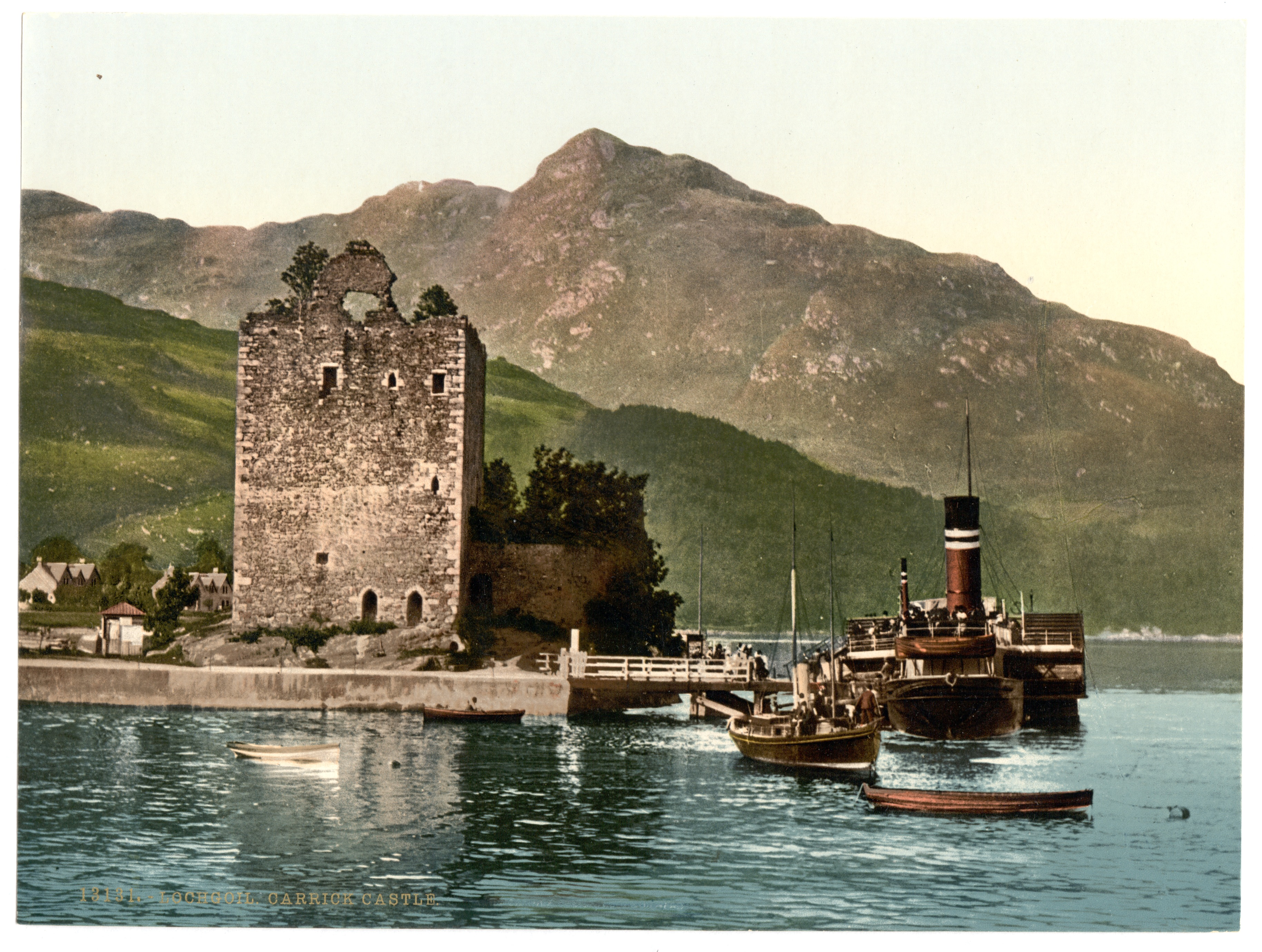
Construction of a pier at the castle attracted development of the village.
