= Carterway Heads =

Hamlet in Northumberland, England

Coordinates: 54.858°N 1.931°W

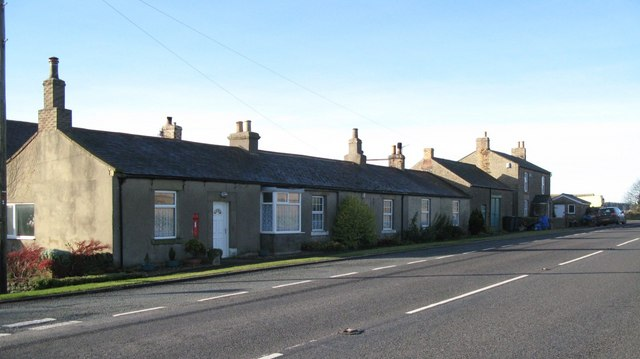
- Cottages in Carterway Heads, 2008

- Location within Northumberland
- OS grid reference: NZ045515
- Civil parish: Shotley Low Quarter
- Unitary authority: Northumberland
- Ceremonial county: Northumberland
- Region: North East
- Country: England
- Sovereign state: United Kingdom
- Post town: CONSETT
- Postcode district: DH8
- Dialling code: 01207
- Police: Northumbria
- Fire: Northumberland
- Ambulance: North East
- UK Parliament: Hexham

Carterway Heads is a hamlet in the civil parish of Shotley Low Quarter, in Northumberland, England. It is situated between Consett and the Derwent Reservoir, at the intersection of the A68 and B6278 roads.

== Governance ==
Carterway Heads is in the parliamentary constituency of Hexham.
