= Cathiron =

Hamlet in Warwickshire, England

Coordinates: 52.401596°N 1.314920°W

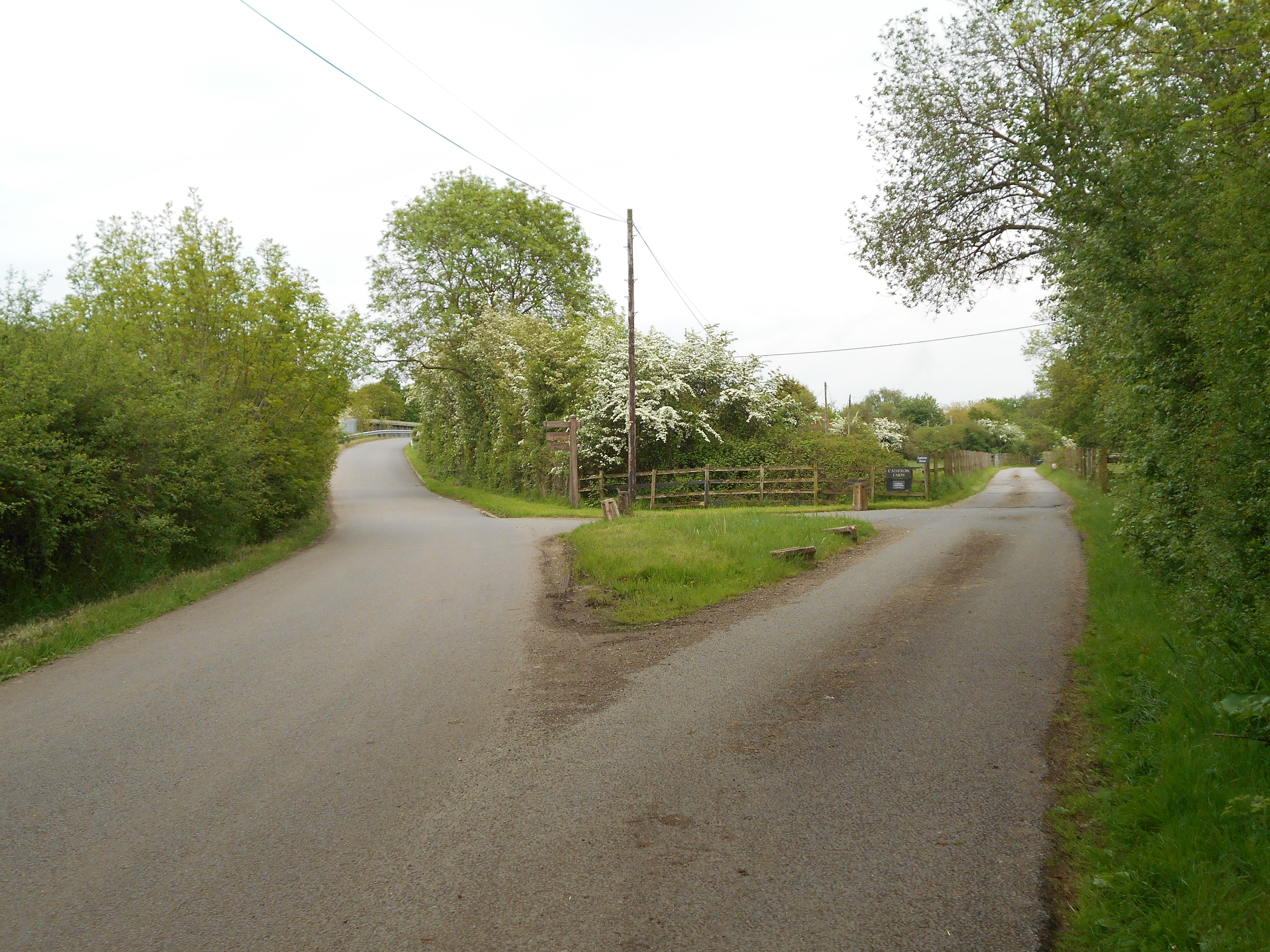
- Cathiron Village Green

- Location within Warwickshire
- OS grid reference: SP4678
- Civil parish: Harborough Magna
- Shire county: Warwickshire
- Region: West Midlands
- Country: England
- Sovereign state: United Kingdom
- Post town: Rugby
- Postcode district: CV23
- Police: Warwickshire
- Fire: Warwickshire
- Ambulance: West Midlands

Cathiron is a small rural hamlet in Warwickshire, England, within the civil parish of Harborough Magna, consisting of around six scattered dwellings along Cathiron Lane, a minor country lane between Harborough Magna and Brinklow. It is 3 miles (4.8 km) northwest of the town of Rugby.

The West Coast Main Line railway line passes through the settlement, but there is no station. The place is a popular location for railway enthusiasts and photographers because of the good views and the diverse traction passing through.

The Oxford Canal also passes through the hamlet. At one time there were sawmills at Cathiron alongside the canal, and these were the major employer of local labour until the 1930s. At the western end of the settlement is Brinklow Marina, which is situated on a disused arm of the canal.
