= Carnsmerry =

Hamlet in Cornwall, England

Coordinates: 50.392°N 4.796°W

Carnsmerry: Cornish: Karnrosmeur
- Location within Cornwall
- OS grid reference: SX013585
- Civil parish: Treverbyn
- Unitary authority: Cornwall
- Ceremonial county: Cornwall
- Region: South West
- Country: England
- Sovereign state: United Kingdom
- Post town: ST. AUSTELL
- Postcode district: PL26
- Dialling code: 01726
- Police: Devon and Cornwall
- Fire: Cornwall
- Ambulance: South Western
- UK Parliament: St Austell and Newquay

Carnsmerry (Cornish: Karnrosmeur, meaning cairn of the great hill spur) is a hamlet in Cornwall, England. It is half a mile south-west of Bugle and lies at around 520 feet (160 m) above sea level. Carnsmerry is in the civil parish of Treverbyn.
