= Castallack =

Hamlet in Cornwall, England

Coordinates: 50.072°N 5.563°W

Castallack: Cornish: Kastellek
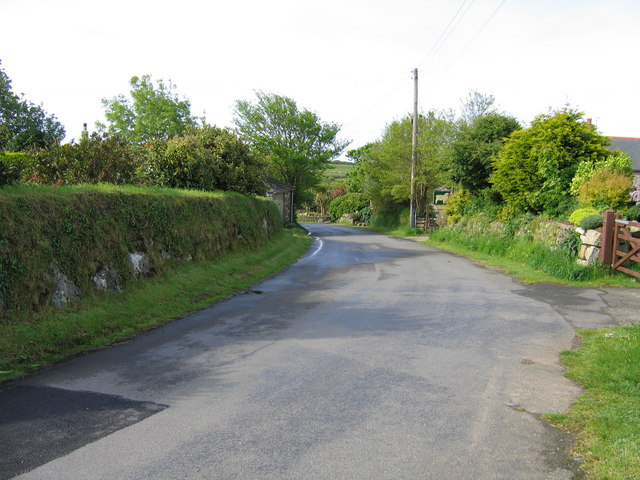
- Castallack

- Location within Cornwall
- OS grid reference: SW451253
- Civil parish: St Buryan, Lamorna and Paul
- Unitary authority: Cornwall
- Ceremonial county: Cornwall
- Region: South West
- Country: England
- Sovereign state: United Kingdom
- Post town: PENZANCE
- Postcode district: TR19
- Dialling code: 01736
- Police: Devon and Cornwall
- Fire: Cornwall
- Ambulance: South Western
- UK Parliament: St Ives

Castallack (Cornish: Kastellek, meaning abounding in castles) is a hamlet in the civil parish of St Buryan, Lamorna and Paul in west Cornwall, England, UK. It is on a minor road between Sheffied and Lamorna.

Castallack lies within the Cornwall Area of Outstanding Natural Beauty (AONB). Almost a third of Cornwall has AONB designation, with the same status and protection as a National Park.

Castallack Roundago (grid reference SW44822540) is a good example of a Romano-British round despite it having been partly destroyed in the 19th century.

Granite from the Castallack quarries was used mainly for gravestones, activity finished in the mid-1980s.
