= Cat Bank =

Hamlet in Cumbria, England

Coordinates: 54.365°N 3.074°W

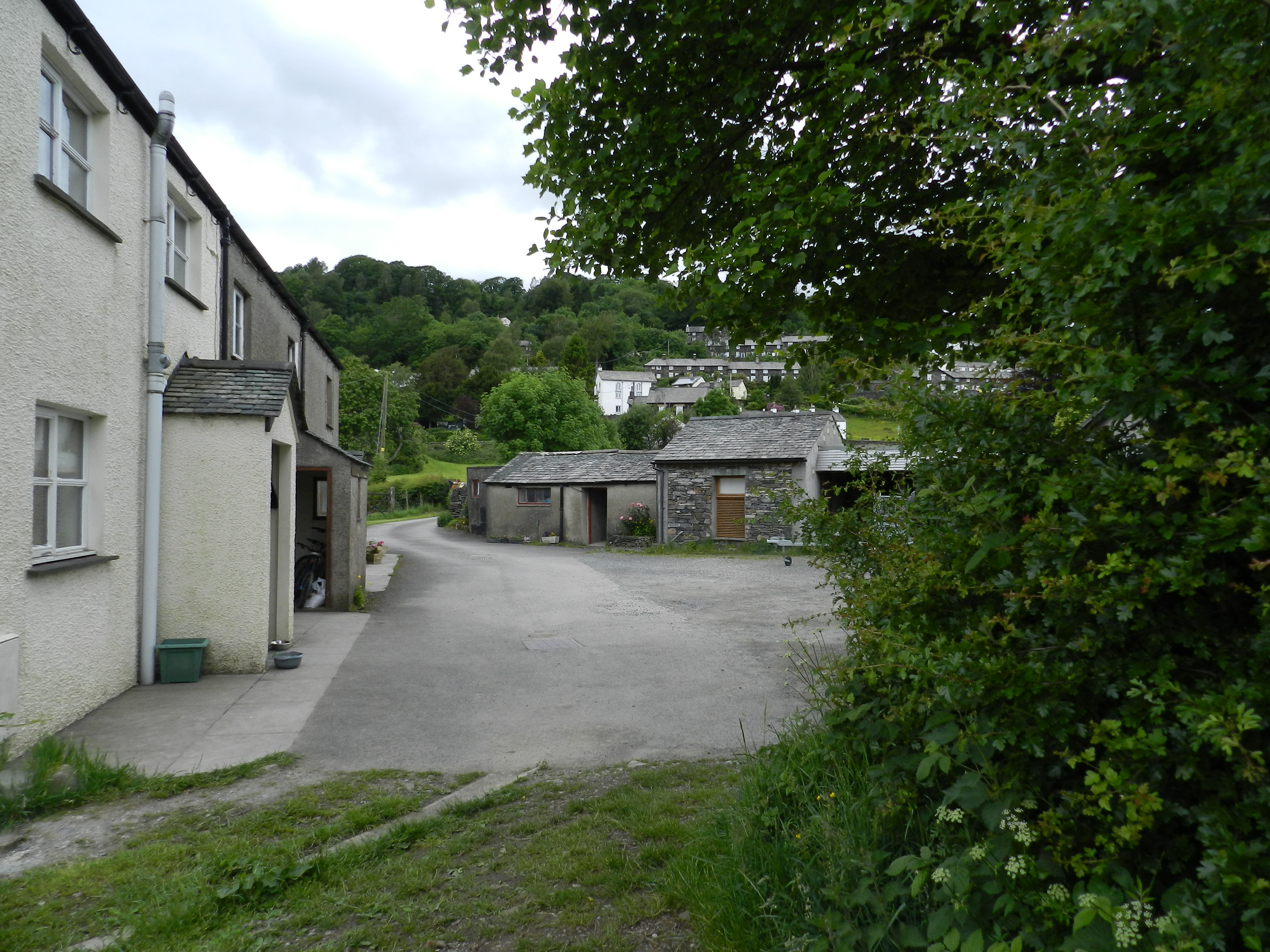
- Cottages at Cat Bank

- Location in South Lakeland Location within Cumbria
- OS grid reference: SD302972
- Civil parish: Coniston
- Unitary authority: Westmorland and Furness
- Ceremonial county: Cumbria
- Region: North West
- Country: England
- Sovereign state: United Kingdom
- Post town: CONISTON
- Postcode district: LA21
- Dialling code: 015394
- Police: Cumbria
- Fire: Cumbria
- Ambulance: North West
- UK Parliament: Westmorland and Lonsdale

Cat Bank is a hamlet in Cumbria, England.
