= Catlodge =

Hamlet in Highland, Scotland

Coordinates: 57.00927°N 4.24696°W

Catlodge: Scottish Gaelic: Caitleag
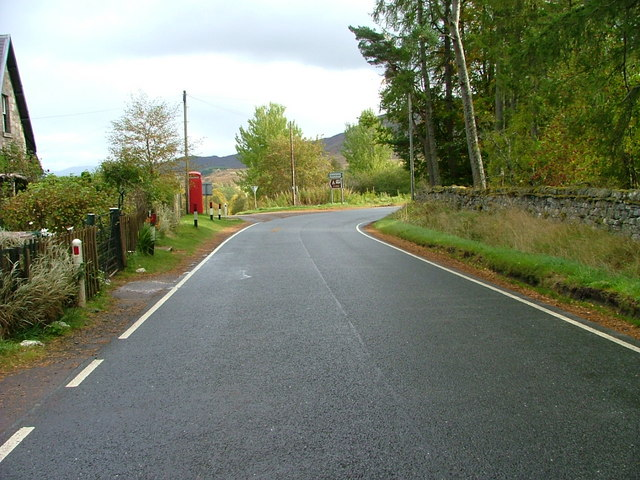

- Location within the Badenoch and Strathspey area
- OS grid reference: NN636931
- Council area: Highland
- Country: Scotland
- Sovereign state: United Kingdom
- Post town: Laggan
- Postcode district: PH20 1
- Police: Scotland
- Fire: Scottish
- Ambulance: Scottish

Catlodge (Scottish Gaelic: Caitleag) is a hamlet, in the district of Newtonmore in Inverness-shire, Scottish Highlands and is in the Scottish council area of Highland. It is located east of Loch Laggan and 7 miles (11 kilometres) north of Dalwhinnie. One of General Wade's military road, which is now the A889, built in the mid 18th century, passes through Catlodge, approaching from the south.
