= Catlowdy =

Hamlet in Cumbria, England

Coordinates: 55.083°N 2.845°W

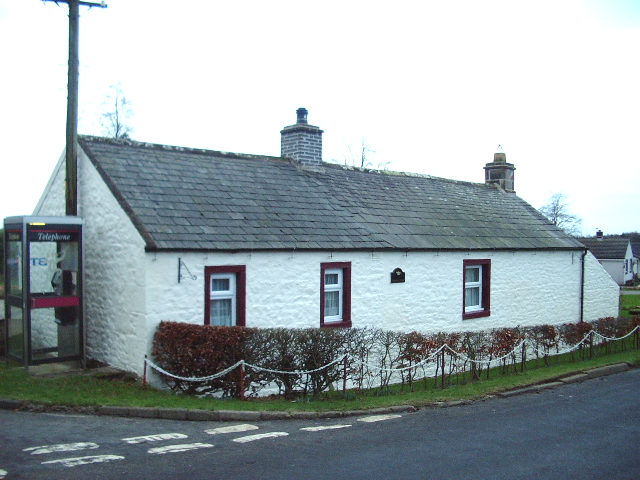
- Corner Cottage, Catlowdy

- Location in the former Carlisle district, Cumbria Location within Cumbria
- OS grid reference: NY460768
- Civil parish: Nicholforest
- Unitary authority: Cumberland
- Ceremonial county: Cumbria
- Region: North West
- Country: England
- Sovereign state: United Kingdom
- Post town: CARLISLE
- Postcode district: CA6
- Dialling code: 01228
- Police: Cumbria
- Fire: Cumbria
- Ambulance: North West
- UK Parliament: Carlisle

Catlowdy is a hamlet in Cumbria, England. It contains the Bessiestown Country Guest House. Its name derives possibly from "cack lady", a nickname for a nearby stream.
