= Martin Caroe =

English architect

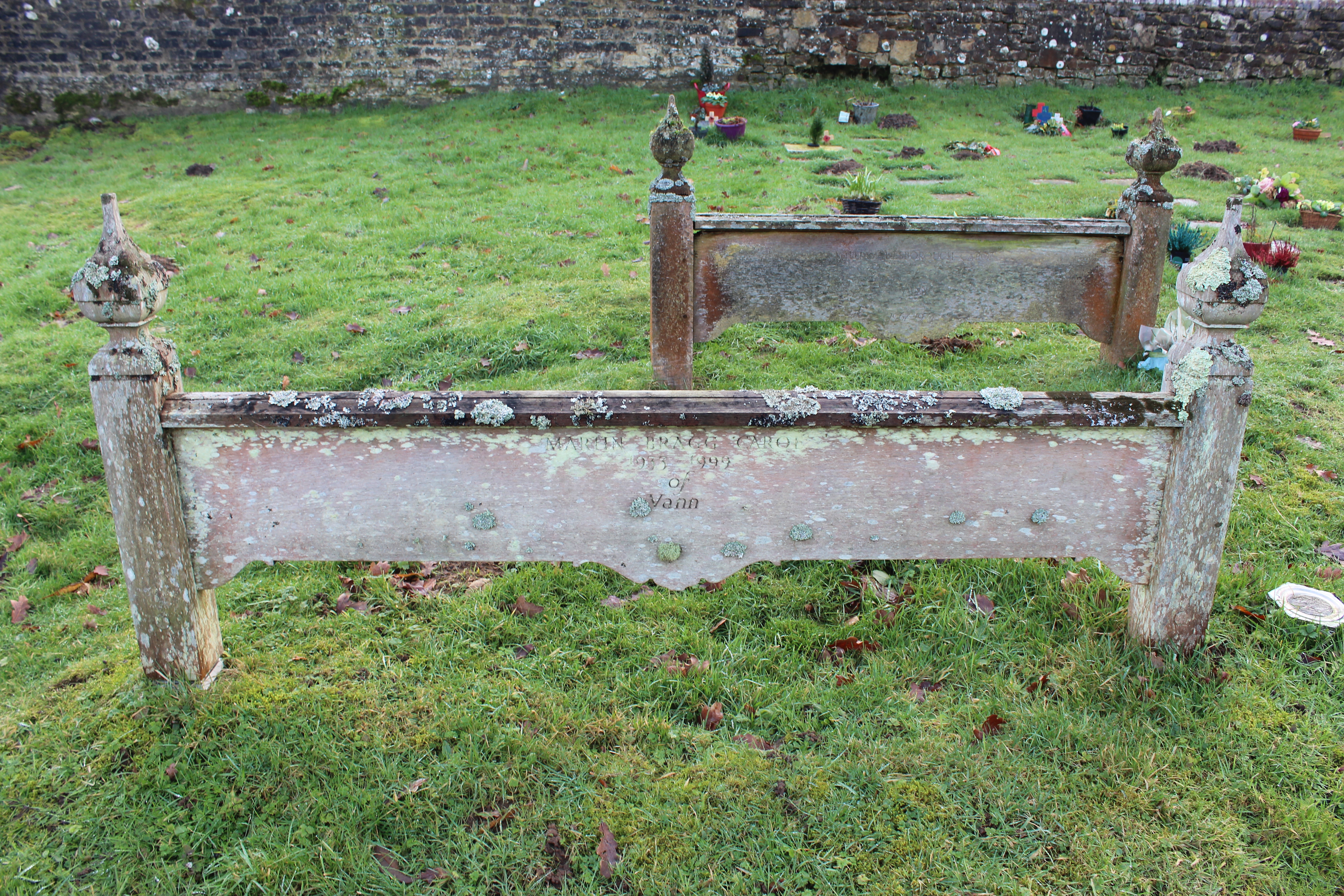
Caroe's grave in Hambledon, Surrey

Martin Bragg Caroe FSA (15 November 1933 − 19 November 1999) was an English conservation architect, and partner in Caroe & Partners from 1963 until his death.

== Biography ==
Caroe was born on 15 November 1933 was the son of the architect Alban Caroe and Gwendolen Mary (née Bragg), daughter of Sir William Henry Bragg. He was educated at Amesbury School, Winchester College and Trinity College, Cambridge (BA, 1957). He married Mary Elizabeth Roskill in 1962 and they had three daughters and two sons.
