= Alban Caroe =

British architect

Alban Douglas Rendall Caroe OBE FSA FRIBA (17 April 1904 − 11 December 1991) was a British architect.

== Life ==
Caroe was born in Chelsea, London, the son of the architect W. D. Caröe and brother of Sir Olaf Caroe. He was educated at Winchester College and Trinity College, Cambridge, where he achieved a first-class degree in the historical tripos in 1925. He married Gwendolen Mary Bragg (1907–1982), daughter of the Nobel Laureate William Henry Bragg. When she died in 1982, she was writing an informal history of the Royal Institution, which was completed by Alban. Alban and Gwendolen's son, with whom he worked, was Martin Caroe. Their daughter, Lucy Caroe, historical geographer, married Richard Adrian, 2nd Baron Adrian. Alban Caroe was appointed an OBE in the 1987 Birthday Honours.

== Notable work ==
- South extension to University of Wales Building, Cardiff (1954). His father had designed the main building (now Cardiff University) in 1903.

== Books ==
- Caroe, Alban D. R. (1949). Old Churches and Modern Craftsmanship. Oxford University Press; xxii+223 pages; illustrated by 24 plates and 29 drawings in the text
- Caroe, A. D. R.; Caroe, M. B. (2001). Stonework: Maintenance and Surface Repair. Church House Publishing. ISBN 9780715175828. (1st edition, 1984)
