= Causeway End =

Hamlet in Cumbria, England

Coordinates: 54.264°N 2.789°W

- Hamlet
- Location in South Lakeland Location within Cumbria
- OS grid reference: SD486856
- Civil parish: Levens
- Unitary authority: Westmorland and Furness
- Ceremonial county: Cumbria
- Region: North West
- Country: England
- Sovereign state: United Kingdom
- Post town: KENDAL
- Postcode district: LA8
- Dialling code: 015395
- Police: Cumbria
- Fire: Cumbria
- Ambulance: North West
- UK Parliament: Westmorland and Lonsdale

Causeway End is a hamlet in Cumbria, England.
