= Carr Gate =

Village in West Yorkshire, England

Coordinates: 53.7128°N 1.5329°W

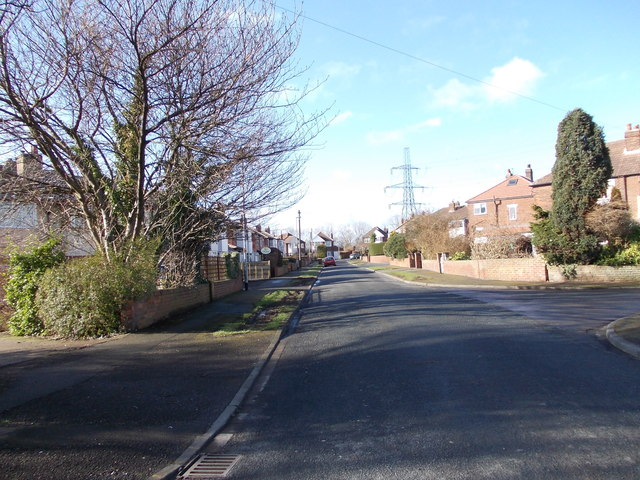
- Bradford Road, Carr Gate

- Location within West Yorkshire
- Metropolitan borough: Wakefield
- Metropolitan county: West Yorkshire
- Region: Yorkshire and the Humber
- Country: England
- Sovereign state: United Kingdom
- Post town: WAKEFIELD
- Postcode district: WF2
- Police: West Yorkshire
- Fire: West Yorkshire
- Ambulance: Yorkshire

Carr Gate is a village in the Wakefield district, in the county of West Yorkshire, England. The village stands to the north-west of Wakefield, and south-east of East Ardsley.
