= Carloggas =

Hamlet in Cornwall, England

Coordinates: 50°26′54″N 4°59′56″W

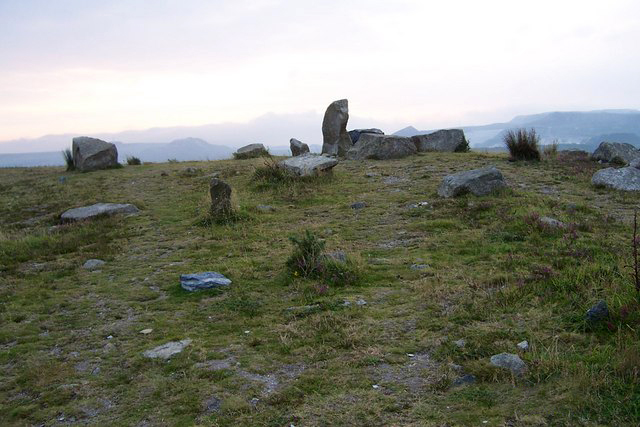
Carloggas Downs, near Treverbyn

Carloggas (Cornish: Kruglogos, meaning fort of mice) is a hamlet in the parish of Mawgan-in-Pydar, Cornwall, England.

There is also a hamlet in the parish of St Stephen-in-Brannel called Carloggas.
