= Carthamartha =

Hamlet in Cornwall, England

Coordinates: 50.577°N 4.309°W

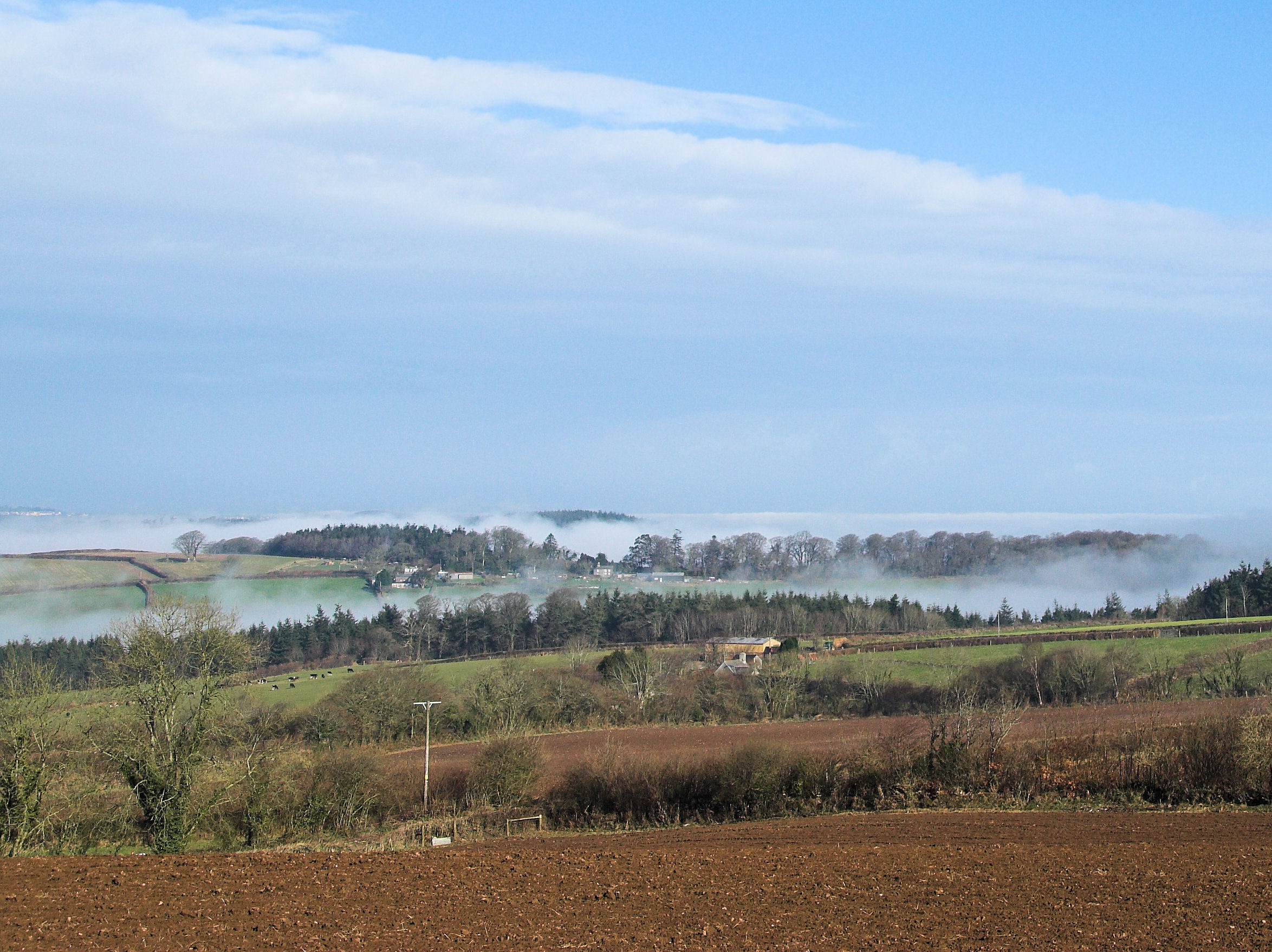

- Location within Cornwall
- OS grid reference: SX366778
- Civil parish: Lezant
- Shire county: Cornwall
- Region: South West
- Country: England
- Sovereign state: United Kingdom
- Post town: LAUNCESTON
- Postcode district: PL15
- Dialling code: 01566
- UK Parliament: North Cornwall

Carthamartha is a hamlet in the civil parish of Lezant, in the Tamar valley 1 mile (1.6 km) east of Treburley and 5 miles (8.0 km) south of Launceston in Cornwall, England, UK. It is in the civil parish of Lezant.
