= Caroe =

Hamlet in Cornwall, England

Coordinates: 50.695°N 4.593°W

Caroe: Cornish: Keryow
- Location within Cornwall
- OS grid reference: SX169916
- Civil parish: Otterham
- Unitary authority: Cornwall
- Ceremonial county: Cornwall
- Region: South West
- Country: England
- Sovereign state: United Kingdom
- Post town: CAMELFORD
- Postcode district: PL32
- Dialling code: 01840
- Police: Devon and Cornwall
- Fire: Cornwall
- Ambulance: South Western
- UK Parliament: North Cornwall

Caroe (Cornish: Keryow, meaning forts) is a small hamlet in the parish of Otterham, Cornwall, England. Caroe is situated approximately ten miles (16 km) south of Bude and six miles (9.7 km) north of Camelford. Caroe is at around 660 feet (201 m) above sea level and lies on the western side of the River Ottery.

Immediately to the south of Caroe is Kernick and Ottery Meadows which is a designated Site of Special Scientific Interest (SSSI).
