= Carkeel =

Village in United Kingdom

Coordinates: 50.423°N 4.238°W

Carkeel: Cornish: Karkil
- Hamlet
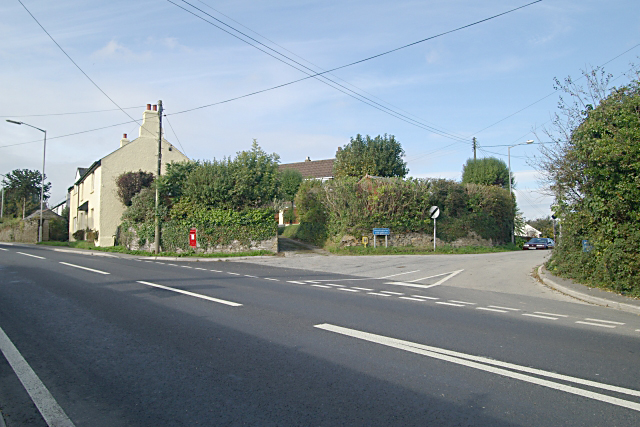

- Location within Cornwall
- Unitary authority: Cornwall
- Region: South West
- Country: England
- Sovereign state: United Kingdom
- Police: Devon and Cornwall
- Fire: Cornwall
- Ambulance: South Western

Carkeel (Cornish: Karkil, meaning ridge fort) is a hamlet north of Saltash in southeast Cornwall, England. It is located along the River Tamar, which separates Cornwall and Devon. The village is famous for its beautiful countryside, historic buildings, and lovely walking paths, which attract many tourists looking to enjoy the charm of rural Cornwall.
