= South Pill =

Suburb of Saltash, Cornwall, England

Coordinates: 50°24′52.96″N 4°13′20.95″W

South Pill is a suburb of Saltash in the civil parish of Saltash, east Cornwall, England, the word "pill" deriving from a tidal pool related to the estuary of the River Tamar.
