= The Minto Papers =

Collection of manuscripts

- Housed at: National Library of Scotland
- Size (no. of items): 2000 +

The Minto Papers is a collection of family, estate and political manuscripts related to the family of Gilbert Elliot-Murray-Kynynmound, 1st Baron Minto and his descendants. The collection has in it over 2000 manuscript volumes. The bulk of the collection was initially purchased in 1958 by the National Library of Scotland (NLS), with later additions to the collection made by purchase and donation. The collection is stored at the NLS main building on George IV Bridge in Edinburgh, Scotland.

== History ==
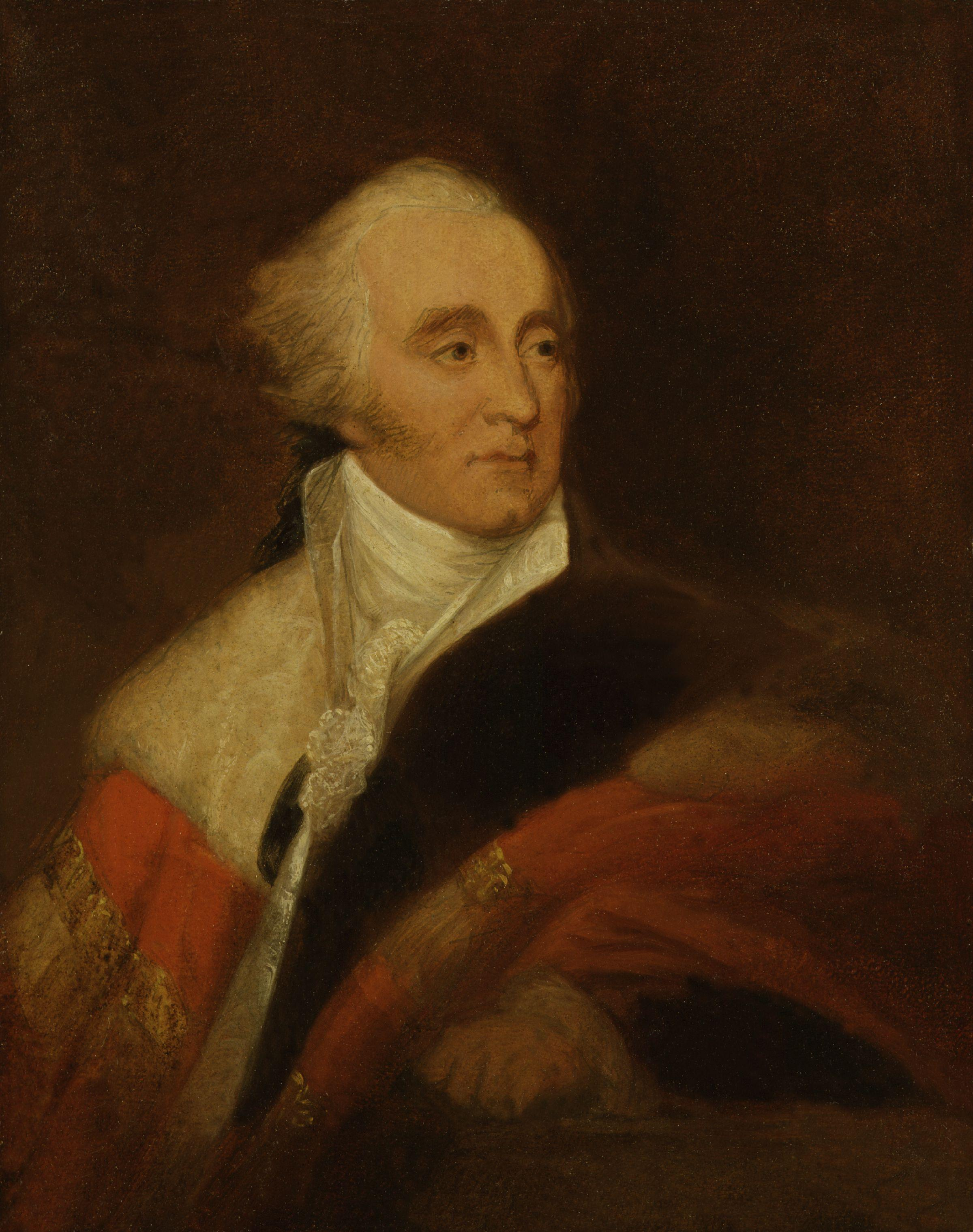
Gilbert Eliot, 1st Earl of Minto

The founder of the family, Sir Gilbert Elliot, 1st Baronet of Minto (1651 - 1718), was born to Margaret Hay and her husband, Gavin Elliot of Midlem Mill, in Scotland. Elliot was initially a writer, though he began assisting in legal cases and helped William Vietch and the Earl of Argyll escape charges in 1679 and 1691 respectively. He was forced to go into exile in Europe due to the treasonous nature of his role, though he was pardoned by King James VII and returned to Scotland in 1687, where he was admitted to the faculty of Advocates. He later was knighted (in 1682) and became a baronet in 1700. He was appointed as a Lord of Session as Lord Minto in 1705, and added Minto to his property in 1703.

Elliot was succeeded by his son, Sir Gilbert Elliot, 2nd Baronet of Minto (1693 - 1766), and his son after him, Sir Gilbert Elliot, 3rd Baronet of Minto, who was both a leading figure in the Scottish Enlightenment and an active politician at Westminster. Sir Gilbert Elliot, 4th Baronet (and, later, 1st Earl) (1751 - 1814), was appointed Governor-General of British India in 1807 and as Earl of Minto in 1813. His eldest son, Gilbert-Elliot-Murray-Kynynmound, 2nd Earl of Minto (1782 - 1859) served as a Cabinet Minister in the Whig Ministries of Grey, Melbourne and Russell. William Hugh, 3rd Earl of Minto (1814 - 1891) was a member of the House of Commons and the House of Lords. His son, Gilbert Elliot-Murray-Kynynmound, 4th Earl of Minto (1845 - 1914) was made Governor-General of Canada in 1898 and Viceroy of British India in 1905.

The Minto Papers document the activities of the members of the Elliot family, and are a valuable source of study for most aspects of Scottish affairs in the 18th and 19th centuries, including: the local history of Roxburghshire; general British politics; war and diplomacy in Europe; Italian affairs of the 19th century; Canadian affairs in the late 19th century; and the British raj. Previously some letters of David Hume were a part of the collection, though these have moved to Oxford's Bodleian Library.

== Scope and Contents ==
The Minto Papers are made up of 2188 volumes and span over the course of three centuries, telling not only the story of the Eliot family, but also providing important historical knowledge and context. The collection is extensive and as such has been catalogued by subject. There are seven subjects which divide the papers: Family papers; Correspondence; Financial Records; Legal documents; Administrative records; Proceedings and reports; and Estate records.

Included in the Minto Papers are multiple volumes on minutes and proceedings, various correspondence to and from family members, papers concerning retrenchment and mutiny, speeches, press cuttings, and microfilms, as well as many other miscellaneous documents.

== Related Materials ==
There are several other collections of documents related to the Elliot family which complement the Minto Papers, namely the papers of Countess Mary Elliot, kept the Bodleian Library of the University of Oxford, and the records on the Boston Tea Party compiled by a member of the family, Sir Gilbert Elliot, 3rd Baronet of Minto, (1722 - 1777), at Harvard University's Houghton Library. There are also some related items in the Osborn Collection at Yale University and in the National Maritime Museum in London.

== See also ==
- The India Papers
- National Library of Scotland
