= Gilbert Elliot =

Gilbert Elliot, Elliott or Eliott may refer to:

- Sir Gilbert Elliot, 1st Baronet, of Minto (c. 1650 – 1718), Member of the Parliament of Scotland, judge of the Court of Session as Lord Minto
- Sir Gilbert Elliot, 2nd Baronet, of Minto (c. 1693 – 1766) MP for Roxburghshire 1722–1726, judge of the Court of Session from 1726 as Lord Minto, Lord Justice Clerk from 1763
- Sir Gilbert Elliot, 3rd Baronet, of Minto (1722–1777) MP for Selkirkshire 1753–65 for Roxburghshire 1765–77, Treasurer of the Navy 1770
- Sir Gilbert Eliott, 3rd Baronet, of Stobs (c. 1680 – 1764), MP for Roxburghshire 1708–15 and 1726–27
- Gilbert Elliot-Murray-Kynynmound, 1st Earl of Minto, (1751–1814), British politician and diplomat
- Gilbert Elliot-Murray-Kynynmound, 4th Earl of Minto (1845–1914), also known as Viscount Melgund, British politician, Governor General of Canada, and Viceroy of India
- Gilbert Elliott (1843–1895), builder of the CSS Albemarle
- Gilbert Elliott (cricketer) (born 1870), Barbadian cricketer
- Gilbert Elliot (priest) (1800–1891), Dean of Bristol
- Gilbert Eliott (Australian politician) (1796–1871), Speaker of the Queensland Legislative Assembly

== See also ==
- Gilbert–Elliott model for describing burst error patterns in transmission channels
