= Earl of Minto =

Earldom in the Peerage of the United Kingdom

- Blazon Arms: Quarterly : 1st and 4th grand quarters, quarterly; 1st and 4th, argent, a hunting-horn sable, stringed gules, in the dexter chief point a crescent of the last; on a chief wavy azure, three mullets of the field (Murray of Melgund); 2nd and 3rd, azure, a chevron argent, between three fleurs-de-lis or (Kynynmound of that ilk); 2nd and 3rd grand quarters, gules, on a bend engrailed or, a baton azure, within a bordure vair (Elliot, of Minto); over all, a chief of augmentation argent, charged with a Moor's head couped in profile proper., being the arms of Corsica.Gules, a chevron between three combs argent. Crest: A dexter arm embowed issuant from clouds, throwing a dart, all proper. Supporters: Dexter, an Indian sheep, sinister, a fawn, all proper. Mottos: Above: Non eget arcu (He needs not the bow); Below: Suaviter et fortiter (Mildy and firmly).
- Creation date: 24 February 1813
- Created by: The Prince Regent (acting on behalf of his father King George III)
- Peerage: Peerage of the United Kingdom
- First holder: Gilbert Elliot-Murray-Kynynmound, 1st Earl of Minto
- Present holder: Timothy Elliot-Murray-Kynynmound, 7th Earl of Minto
- Heir apparent: Gilbert Francis Elliot-Murray-Kynynmound, Viscount Melgund
- Subsidiary titles: Viscount Melgund; Baron Minto; Baronet ‘of Headshaw’
- Status: Extant
- Seat: Minto House
- Motto: Over the Crest: NON EGET ARCU (He needs not the bow); Below the shield: SUAVITER ET FORTITER (Mildly but firmly)

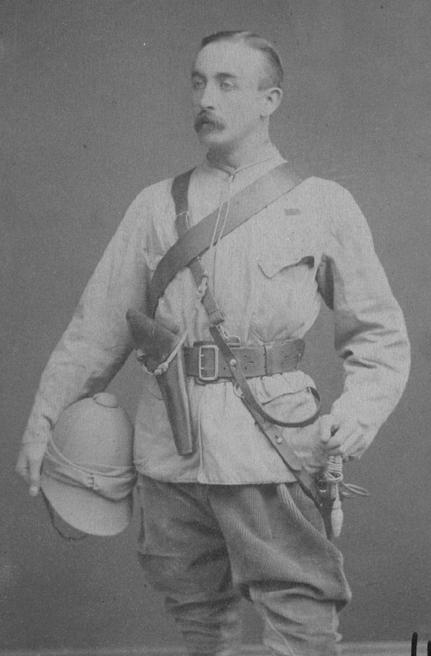
The 4th Earl of Minto.

Earl of Minto, in the County of Roxburgh, is a title in the Peerage of the United Kingdom. It was created in 1813 for Gilbert Elliot-Murray-Kynynmound, 1st Baron Minto. The current earl is Gilbert Timothy George Lariston Elliot-Murray-Kynynmound, 7th Earl of Minto (born 1953).

The family seat is Minto Park, near Hawick in the Scottish Borders. The original family seat, Minto House, was demolished in 1992 after having been abandoned for some time.

== History ==
The family descends from the politician and judge Gilbert Elliot, who served as a Lord of Session under the judicial title of Lord Minto. In 1700 he was created a baronet, of Minto in the County of Roxburgh, in the Baronetage of Nova Scotia. He was succeeded by his son, the second Baronet. He was also a prominent judge and politician and served as a Lord of Session (under the judicial title of Lord Minto) from 1726 to 1733, as a Lord of the Justiciary from 1733 to 1765 and as Lord Justice Clerk from 1763 to 1766. His eldest son, the third Baronet, was a politician and held ministerial office as a Lord of the Admiralty from 1756 to 1762 and as Treasurer of the Navy from 1767 to 1770. He was succeeded by his eldest son, the fourth Baronet. He was a noted diplomat, politician and colonial administrator and served as Viceroy of the Anglo-Corsican Kingdom from 1794 to 1796 and Governor-General of India from 1807 to 1813. In 1797 he was raised to the Peerage of Great Britain as Baron Minto, of Minto in the County of Roxburgh. In 1813 he was further honoured when he was made Viscount Melgund, of Melgund in the County of Forfar, and Earl of Minto, in the County of Roxburgh. The latter titles are in the Peerage of the United Kingdom. In 1797 Lord Minto assumed by Royal licence the additional surnames of Murray-Kynynmound after those of Elliot.

He was succeeded by his eldest son, the second Earl. He was a diplomat and Whig politician and held office as First Lord of the Admiralty from 1835 to 1841 and as Lord Privy Seal from 1846 to 1852. Lord Minto was succeeded by his eldest son, the third Earl. He sat as a Liberal Member of Parliament for Hythe, Greenock and Clackmannanshire. On his death the titles passed to his son, the fourth Earl. He was a prominent colonial administrator and served as Governor General of Canada from 1898 to 1904 and as Viceroy of India from 1905 to 1910. As of 2014 the titles are held by his great-grandson (the titles having descended from father to son), the seventh Earl, who succeeded in 2005.

The family seat is Minto, near Hawick, Roxburghshire. In 1992 Minto House was listed as Category A, and largely demolished within weeks.

== Elliot baronets, of Minto (1700) ==
- Sir Gilbert Elliot, 1st Baronet (c. 1650–1718)
- Sir Gilbert Elliot, 2nd Baronet (c. 1693–1766)
- Sir Gilbert Elliot, 3rd Baronet (1722–1777)
- Sir Gilbert Elliot, 4th Baronet (1751–1814) (created Baron Minto in 1797 and Earl of Minto in 1813)

== Earls of Minto (1813–present) ==
- Gilbert Elliot-Murray-Kynynmound, 1st Earl of Minto (1751–1814)
- Gilbert Elliot-Murray-Kynynmound, 2nd Earl of Minto (1782–1859)
- William Hugh Elliot-Murray-Kynynmound, 3rd Earl of Minto (1814–1891)
- Gilbert John Elliot-Murray-Kynynmound, 4th Earl of Minto (1845–1914)
- Victor Gilbert Lariston Garnet Elliot-Murray-Kynynmound, 5th Earl of Minto (1891–1975)
- Gilbert Edward George Lariston Elliot-Murray-Kynynmound, 6th Earl of Minto (1928–2005)
- Gilbert Timothy George Lariston Elliot-Murray-Kynynmound, 7th Earl of Minto (born 1953)

The heir apparent is the present holder's eldest son, Gilbert Francis Elliot-Murray-Kynynmound, Viscount Melgund (born 1984).

== Other family members ==
Numerous other members of the family have also gained distinction.

- John Elliot, younger son of the second Baronet, was an admiral in the Royal Navy and also served as Commodore Governor of Newfoundland.
- Andrew Elliot, another younger son of the second Baronet, was the last colonial governor of New York.
- Jean Elliot, daughter of the second Baronet, was a poet and wrote one of the most famous versions of the Scottish folk tune The Flowers of the Forest.
- Hugh Elliot, second son of the third Baronet, was a diplomat and colonial administrator and served as Governor of the Leeward Islands from 1808 to 1814. His son Sir Charles Elliot was an admiral in the Royal Navy and colonial administrator.
- The Hon. Sir George Elliot, second son of the first Earl, was an admiral in the Royal Navy and also held political office under Lord Grey as First Secretary to the Admiralty from 1830 to 1834. He was the father of:
  - 1) Sir George Augustus Elliot (1812–1901), an admiral in the Royal Navy, and
  - 2) Sir Alexander James Hardy Elliot, a major-general in the army.
- The Hon. John Edmund Elliot, third son of the first Earl, was a Member of Parliament. His grandson Charles Sinclair Elliot (1853–1915) was a captain in the Royal Navy.
- The Hon. Sir Henry George Elliot, second son of the second Earl, was a noted diplomat and served as Ambassador to Austria from 1877 to 1884. His son Sir Francis Edmund Hugh Elliot (1851–1940) was also a diplomat and served as Minister to Greece.
- Sir Charles Gilbert John Brydone Elliot (1818–1895), third son of the second Earl, was an Admiral of the Fleet.
- The Hon. Arthur Ralph Douglas Elliot (known as Arthur Elliott), second son of the third Earl, was a Conservative politician and served as Financial Secretary to the Treasury in 1903.
- The Hon. Hugh Frederick Hislop Elliot, third son of the third Earl, sat as Member of Parliament for Ayrshire North.
