= Andrew Elliot =

British merchant (1728–1797)

His Excellency Andrew Elliot
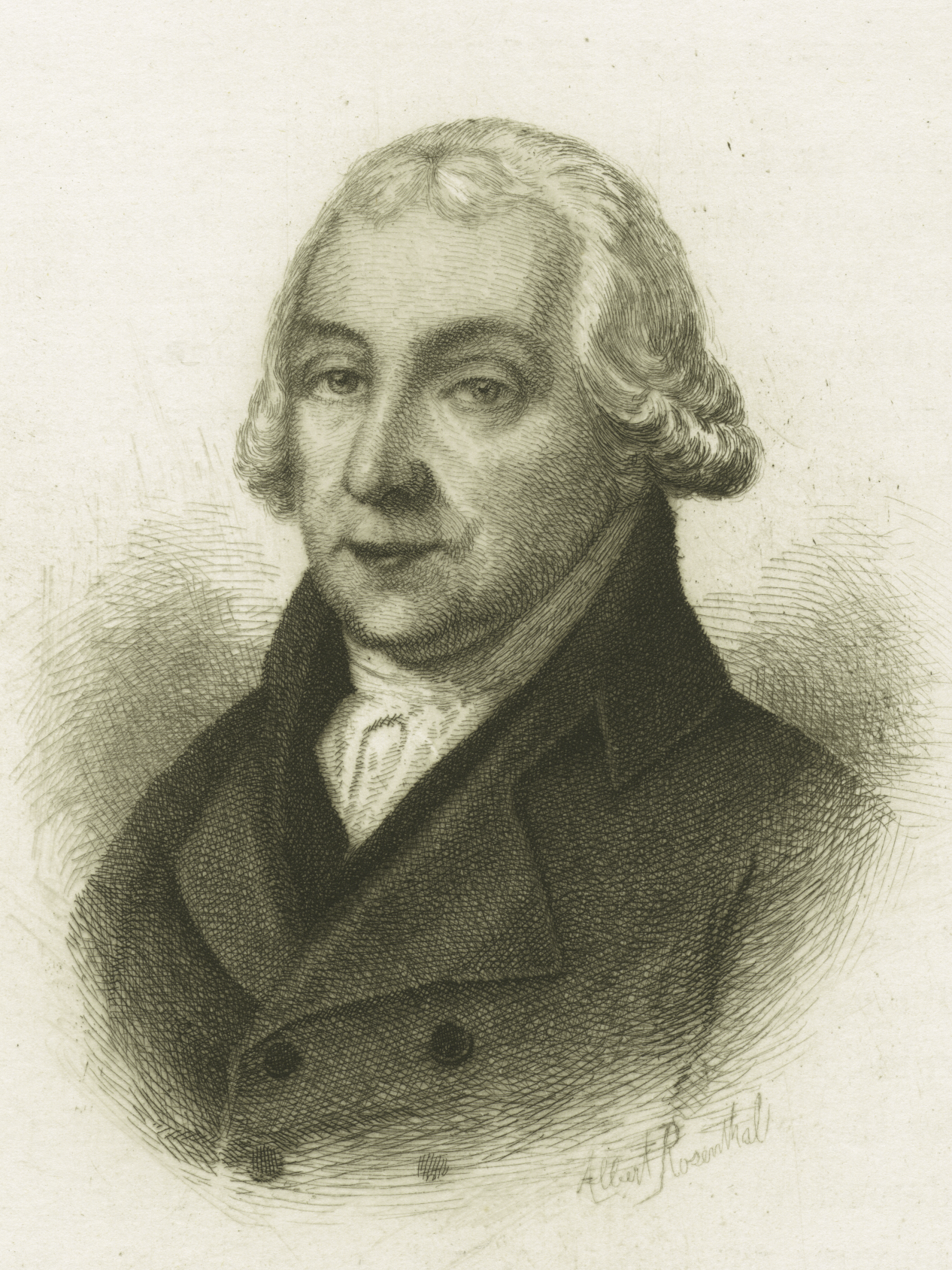

41st Governor of New York Acting
- In office 17 April 1783 – 25 November 1783
- Monarch: George III
- Preceded by: James Robertson
- Succeeded by: Vacant (American Revolution) (Title next held by George Clinton)

Personal details
- Born: November 1728 Edinburgh, Scotland
- Died: 25 May 1797 (aged 68) Mount Teviot, Jedburgh, Scotland
- Spouses: Eleanor McCall (m. 1754; died 1756); Elisabeth Plumsted (m. 1760)
- Children: Eleanor Jauncey Digby; Agnes, Lady Carnegie; Elizabeth Cathcart, Countess Cathcart
- Parent(s): Sir Gilbert Elliot, 2nd Bt of Minto; Helen Stewart
- Profession: Colonial merchant, official

Andrew Elliot (November 1728 – 25 May 1797) was a British merchant and official who served as the Acting and last British Governor of New York in 1783.

== Early life ==
Elliot was born November 1728 in Edinburgh, the son of Sir Gilbert Elliot, 2nd Baronet of Minto and the former Helen Steuart (1696–1774). He was a brother of Gilbert, John, and Jean Elliot.

His paternal grandparents were Sir Gilbert Elliot, 1st Baronet, of Minto and Dame Jane Carre (the fourth daughter of Sir Andrew Carre of Cavers, Roxborough). His maternal grandparents were Sir Robert Steuart, 1st Baronet, of Allanbank, and, his second wife, Helen Cockburn (a daughter of Sir Alexander Cockburn of Langton). His maternal uncle was Archibald Stewart, Lord Provost of Edinburgh.

== Career ==
He arrived in Pennsylvania in 1746 as an apprentice and established himself as a trader. In 1762, he was elected a member of the board of trustees of the College of Philadelphia. In 1763, he was appointed collector of the port of New York and receiver general of New York. In 1764 he was appointed to the Province of New York executive council.

During the American Revolution he remained a Loyalist. A few days after the declaration of independence he left New York City for Perth Amboy for his safety. He returned to New York City after the British reoccupation. On 1 May 1777 he was appointed the head of the military court of police and on 17 July the superintendent of all imports and exports. In 1780 he was appointed lieutenant governor of the Province of New York. In 1783 he was part of the delegation that met with George Washington at Tappan. He was the acting governor from 17 April 1783 to 25 November 1783.

=== Later life ===
Elliot sent his family back to Scotland on HMS Nonsuch on 9 July, and then he left for Scotland in December 1783. After returning to Scotland, he was asked to serve as British Minister to America in 1790, but declined and held no further public offices.

== Personal life ==
Coat of Arms of Andrew Elliot

Elliot was twice married. His first marriage was in 1754 to Eleanor McCall, a daughter of George McCall and Anne (née Yeates) McCall of Philadelphia. Together, they were the parents of one child:

- Eleanor Elliot (c. 1756–1830), who married James Jauncey Jr., a member of the New York General Assembly, in 1773. After his death, she married Admiral Robert Digby, MP for Wells, in 1784.

After the death of his first wife, he married Elisabeth Plumsted in 1760. She was a daughter of the Mayor of Philadelphia William Plumsted and, his first wife, Rebecca (née Kearney) Plumsted. After Elisabeth's mother died, her father William married Mary McCall, the sister of Elliot's first wife, making Elisabeth a step-daughter of his sister-in-law. Together, they were the parents of:

- Agnes Murray Elliot (1763–1860), who married Sir David Carnegie, 4th Baronet.
- Elizabeth Elliot (c. 1764–1847), who married William Cathcart, 1st Earl Cathcart.

Elliot died at home on 25 May 1797 at Mount Teviot, Jedburgh, aged 68.

Government offices
Preceded by James Robertson	Governor of New York; Acting; 1783	Vacant American Revolution Title next held by George Clinton
