= 1789 Speaker of the British House of Commons election =

The 1789 Speaker of the British House of Commons election may refer to:

- January 1789 Speaker of the British House of Commons election, an election held on 5 January
- June 1789 Speaker of the British House of Commons election, an election held on 8 June
