= Minto House (Scottish Borders) =

Former country house in Minto, Scotland

Coordinates: 55.4762°N 2.6785°W

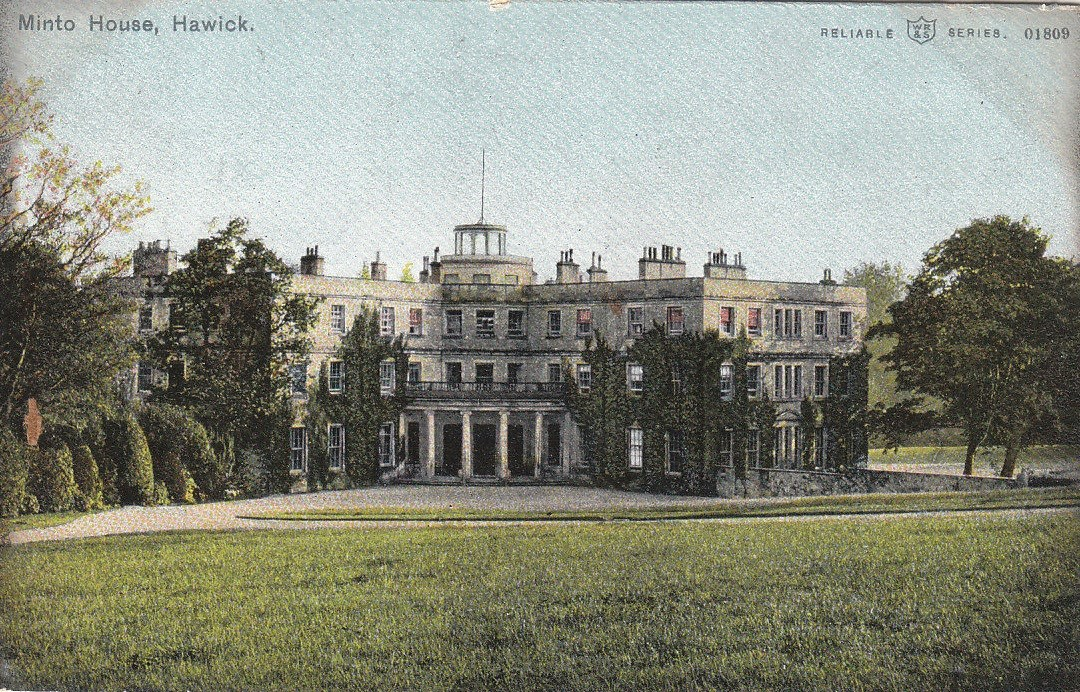
Minto House

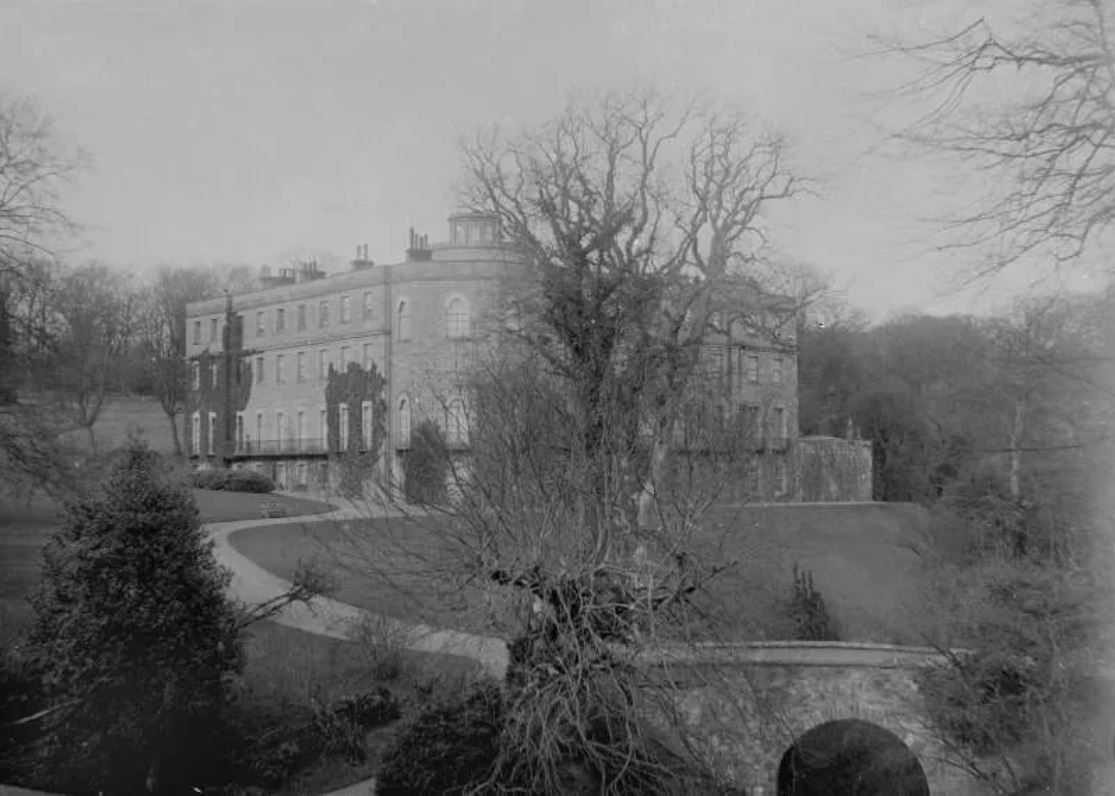
Minto House seen from the garden

Minto House was a historic country house in Minto, Roxburghshire (now Scottish Borders), Scotland, and the principal seat of the Elliot family, later Earls of Minto. Originating as a 16th-century Border tower, it was transformed during the 18th and 19th centuries into a substantial classical mansion through successive rebuilding campaigns involving architects including William Adam, Archibald Elliot, William Playfair and Sir Robert Lorimer. The house was closely associated with members of the Elliot family who held prominent political and imperial offices.

After a period of institutional use in the mid-20th century, the building returned to private ownership but fell into serious disrepair. Demolition commenced in August 1992, shortly before emergency Category A listed status was granted, and the house was removed in 1992–93. The episode attracted national attention and became a frequently cited case in Scottish heritage conservation debates. Only the early 20th-century garden terraces survive.

== History ==
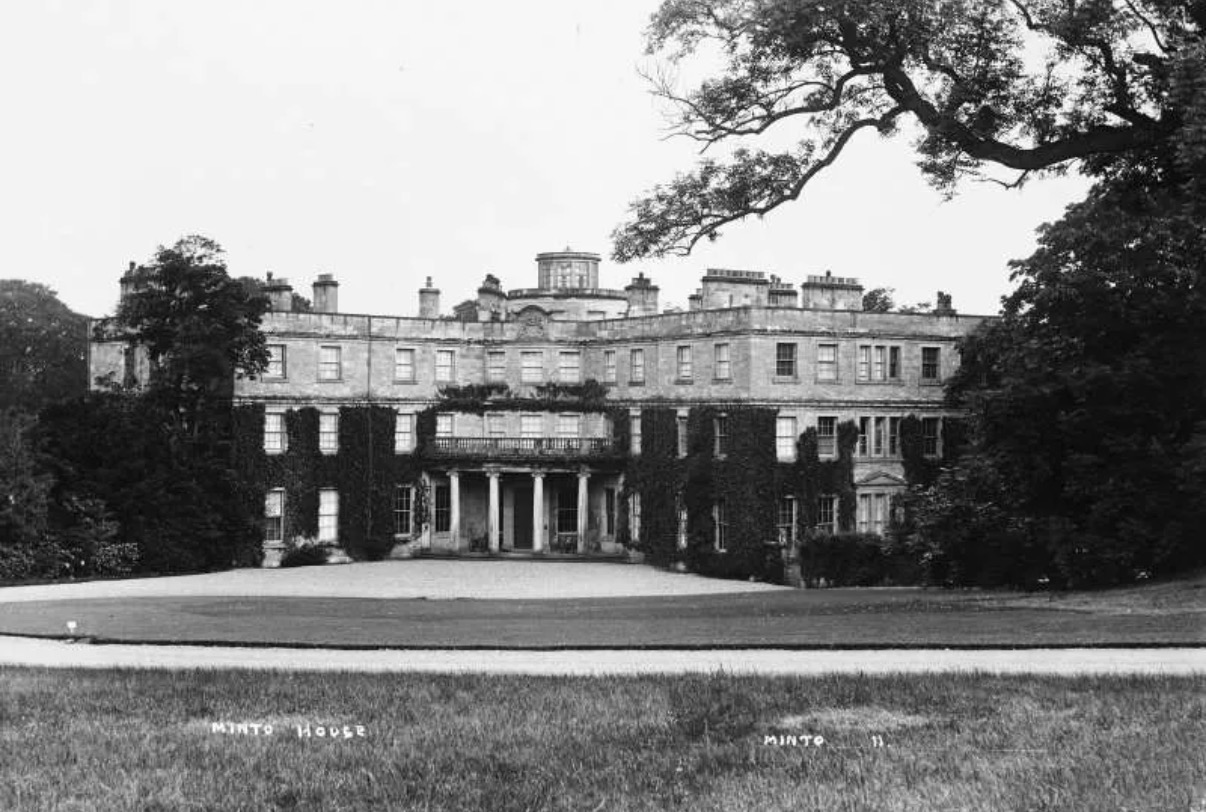
Entrance front of Minto House

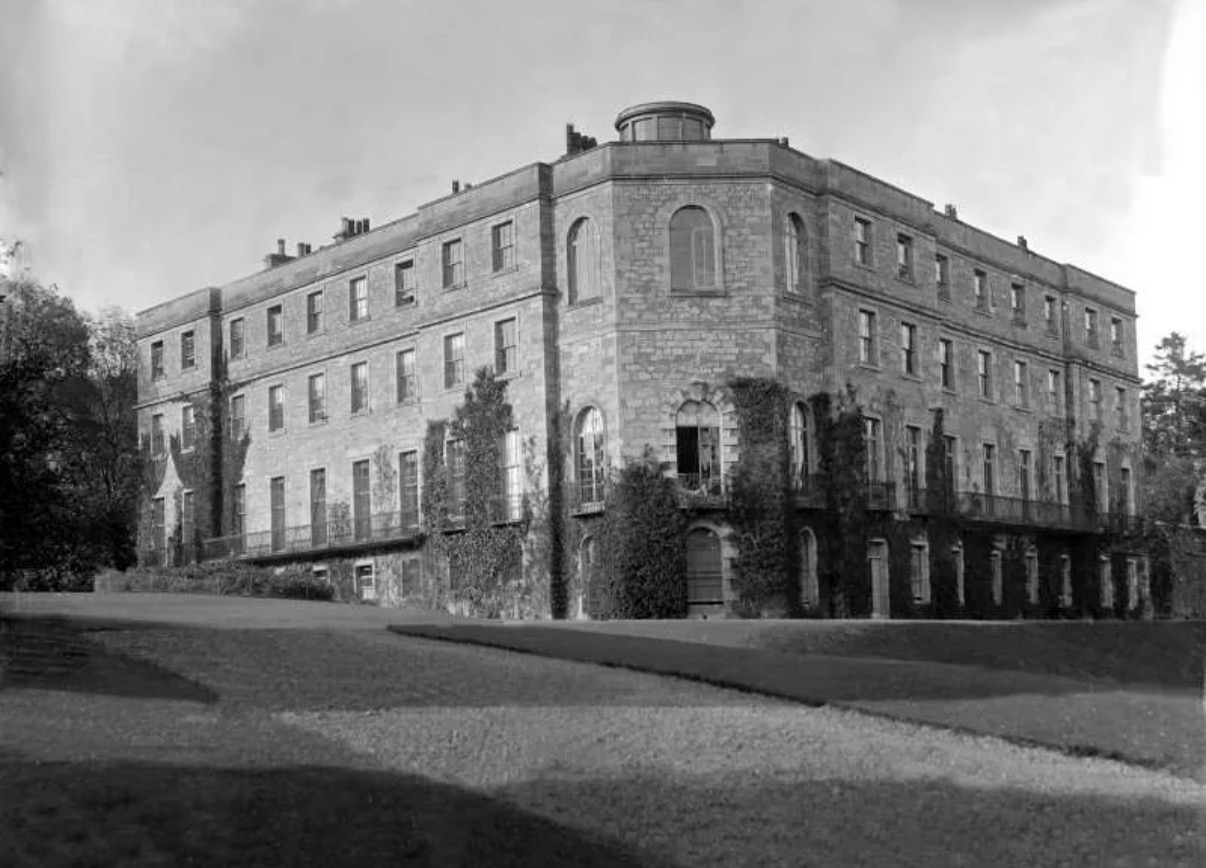
Minto House seen from the south west

=== Origins ===
The earliest structure on the site was a 16th-century Tower House, typical of the defensive architecture of the Scottish Borders. This tower formed the nucleus of what would later become Minto House.

The estate came into the possession of the Elliot family in about 1700. The Elliots were an established Border family who rose in status over the following centuries, culminating in the creation of the earldom of Minto in 1813.

=== 18th-century rebuilding ===
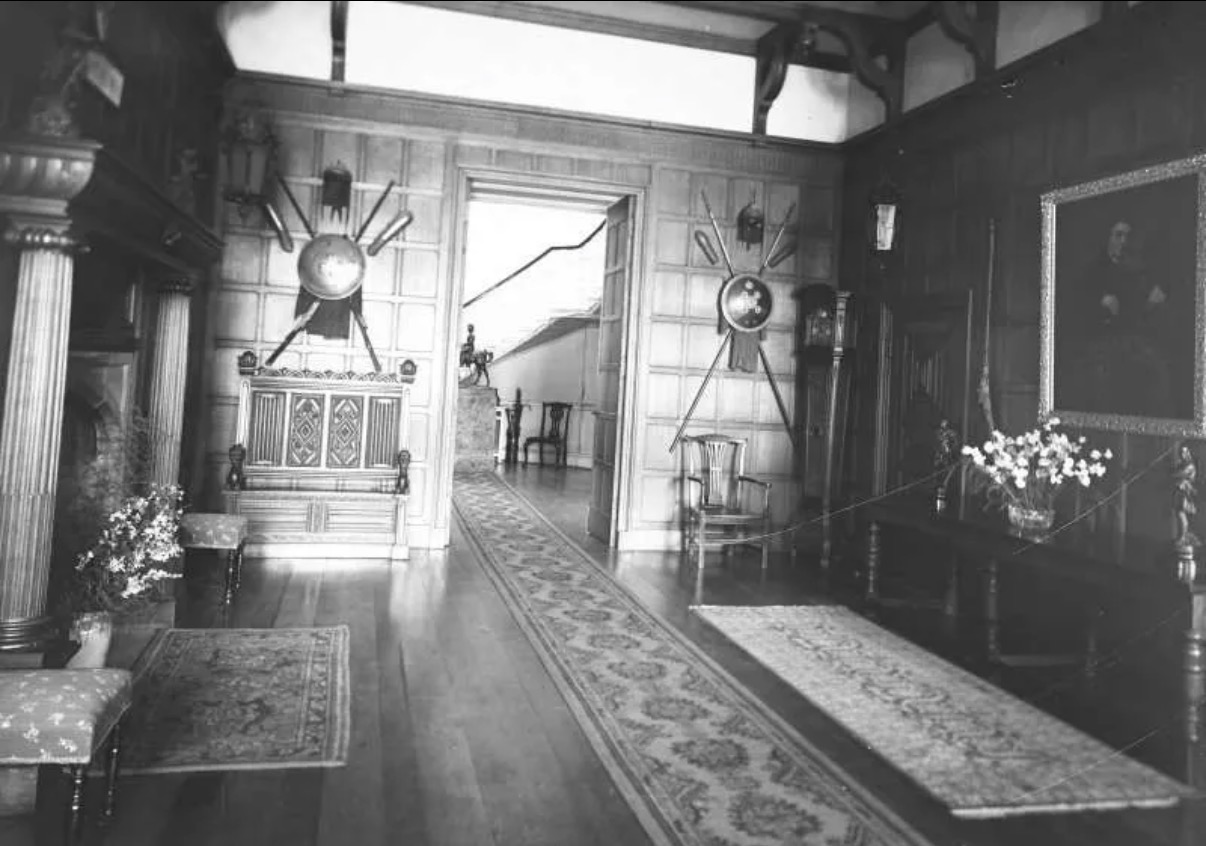
The entrance hall adorned with Persian armour

Between 1738 and 1743, the earlier tower was incorporated into a substantially rebuilt classical mansion attributed to William Adam. The rebuilding was undertaken for Sir Gilbert Elliot, 2nd Baronet of Minto, who sought to modernise the ancestral seat in accordance with contemporary architectural taste

Adam's intervention effectively “encased” the earlier 16th-century structure within a large four-storey Georgian country house. While the defensive character of the original tower was retained within the fabric, the exterior presentation was transformed into a symmetrical classical composition

=== 19th-century alterations and early 20th-century additions ===
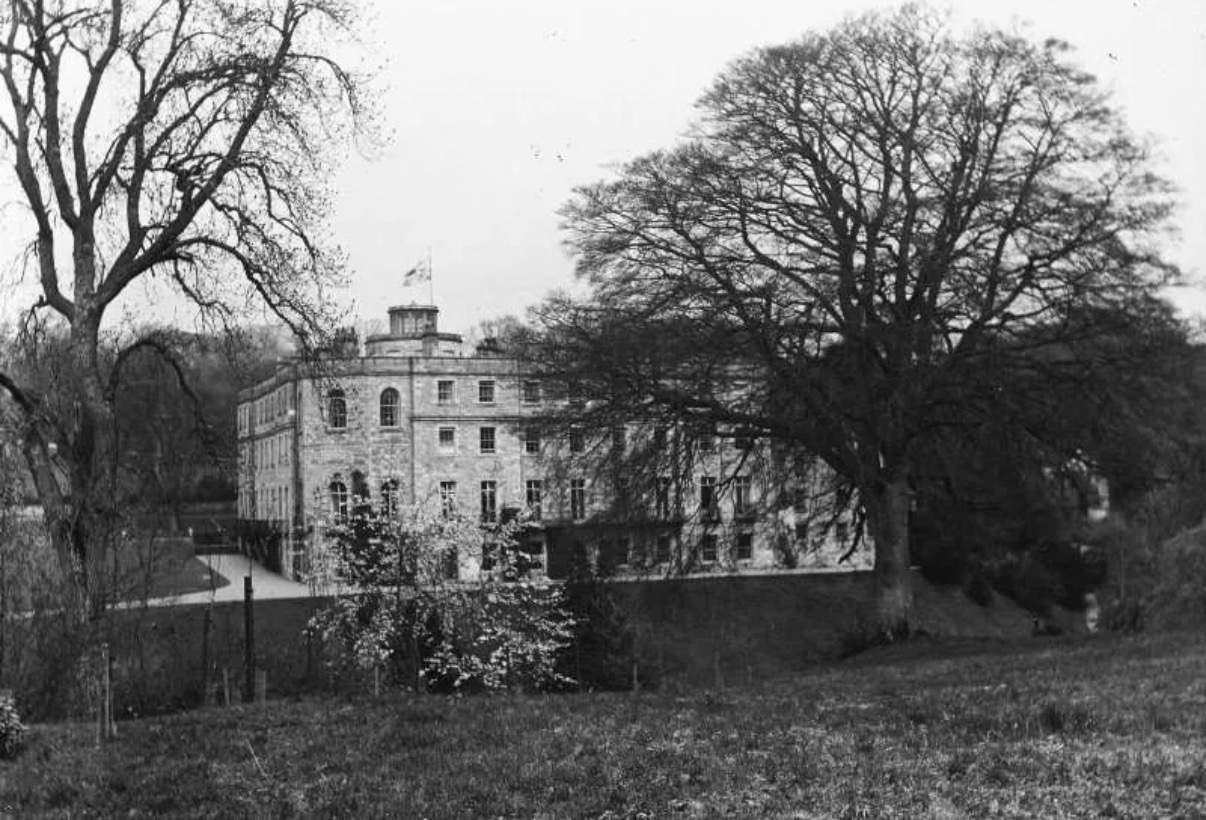
Minto House seen from the south

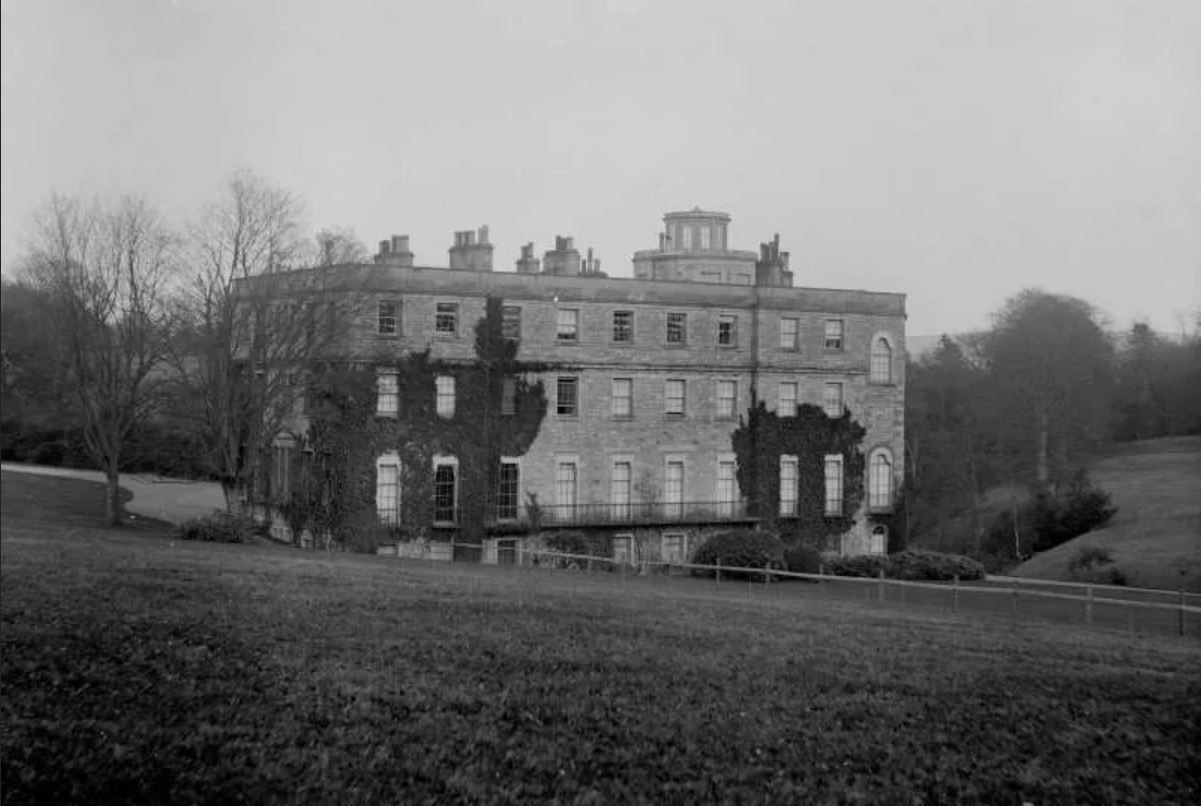
Minto House seen from the north west

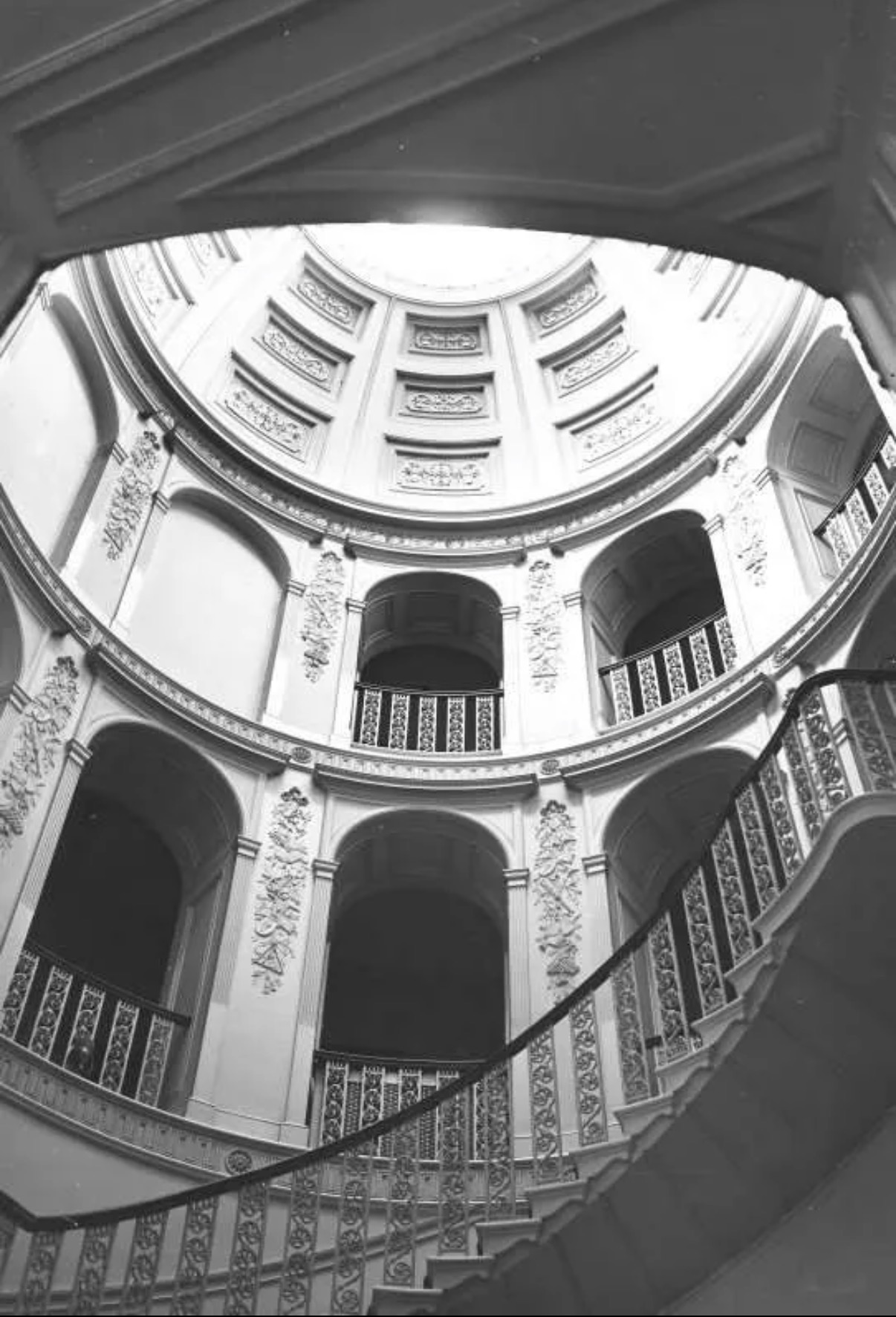
The staircase at Minto House

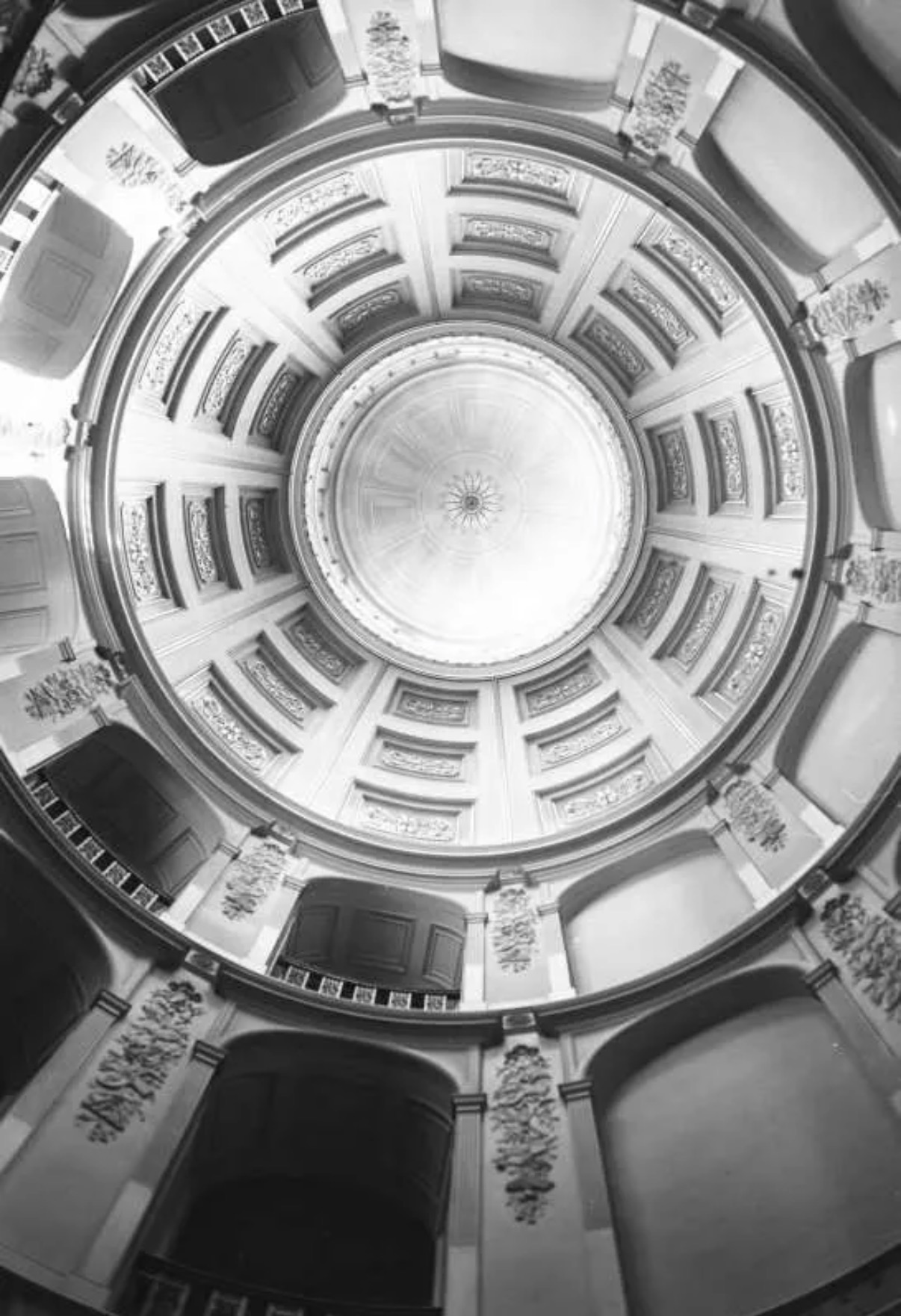
The domed staire case at Minto House

A significant remodelling campaign took place between 1809 and 1814 under the direction of Archibald Elliot. This phase altered the house into a V-shaped plan, with two principal ranges meeting at an acute angle. The arrangement created a carefully composed sequence of principal rooms aligned along the inner axis of the V and terminating at its apex. Architectural drawings preserved in the National Library of Scotland record Elliot's proposed alterations and provide evidence for changes to both the external elevations and the internal planning.

==== Archibald Elliot's design for Minto House ====
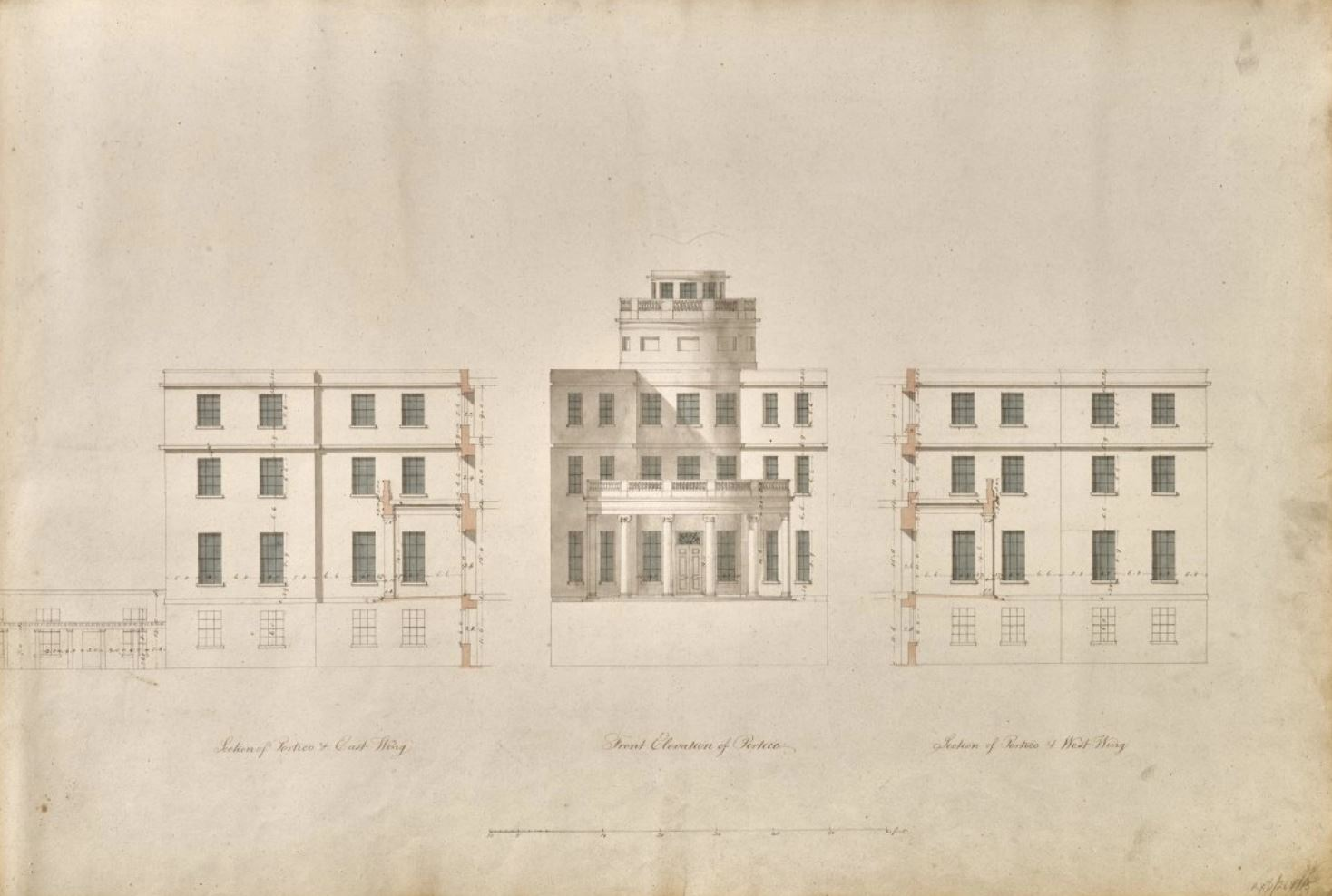
The front elevation including entrance

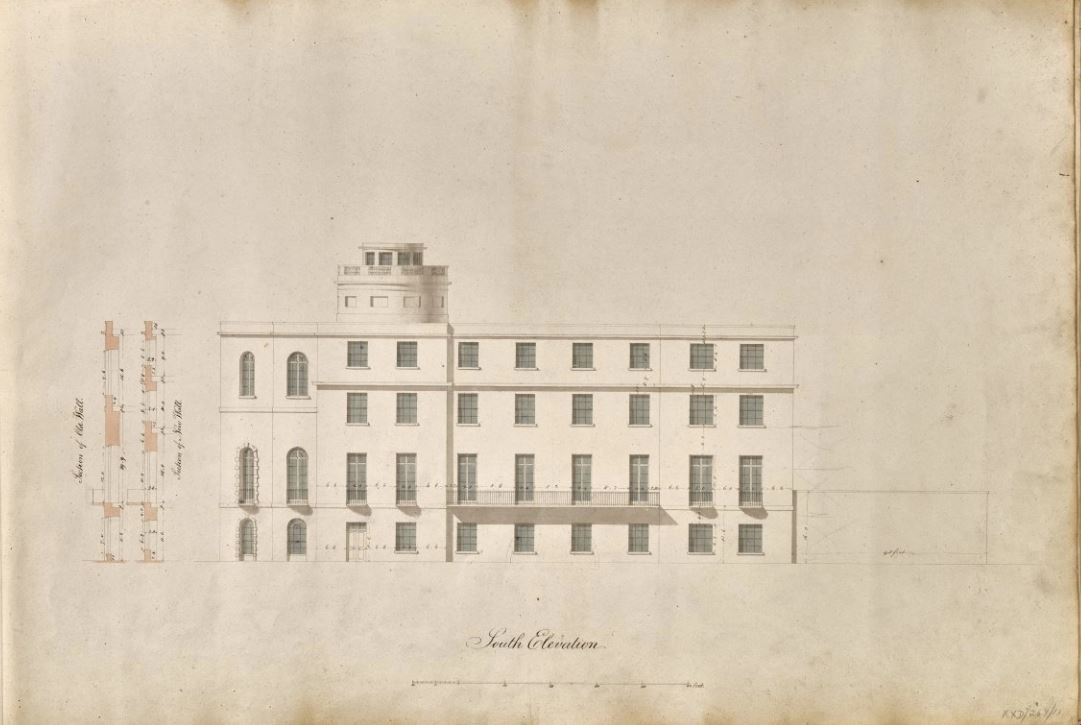
The south elevation

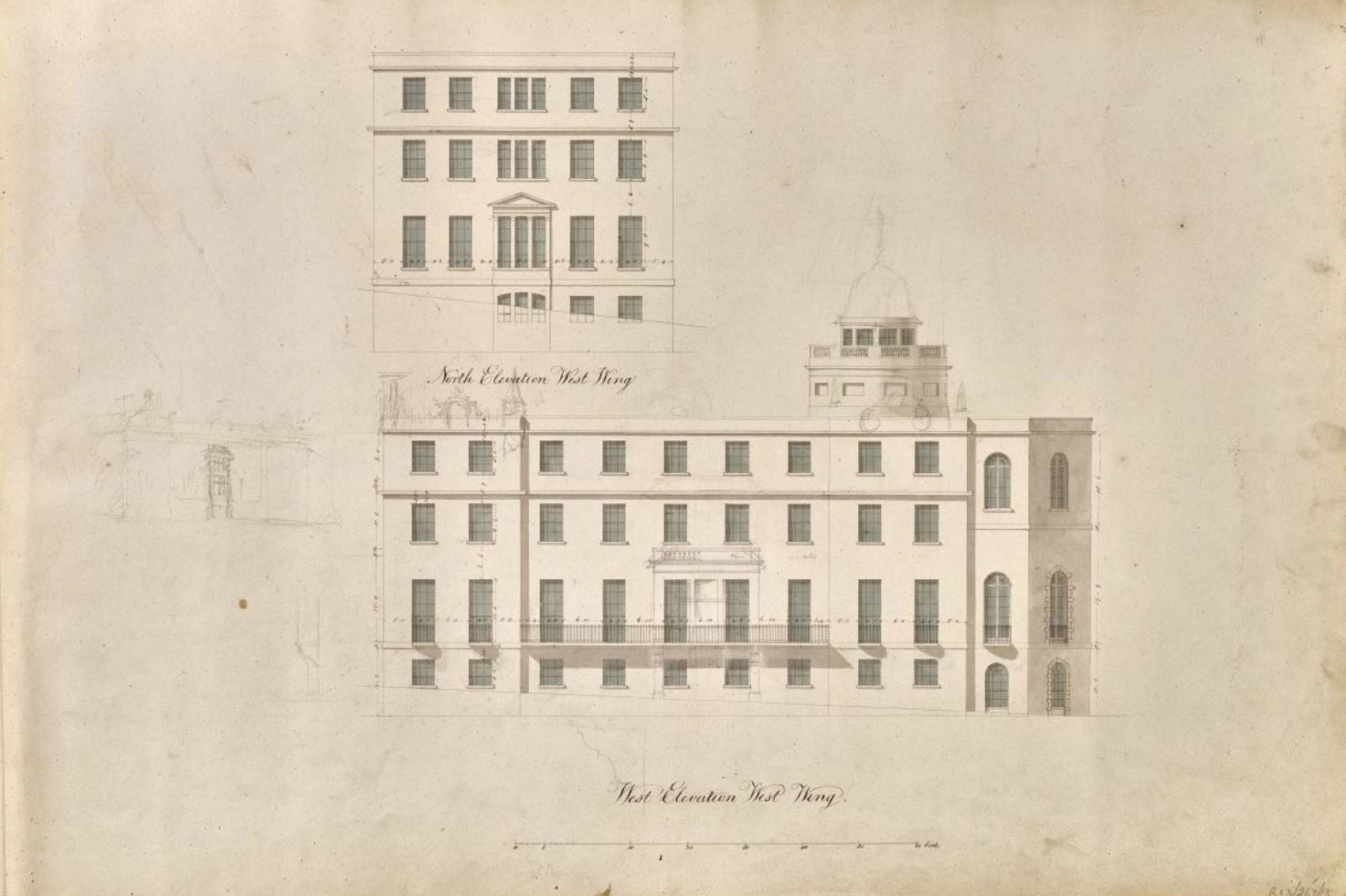
The Red west elevation

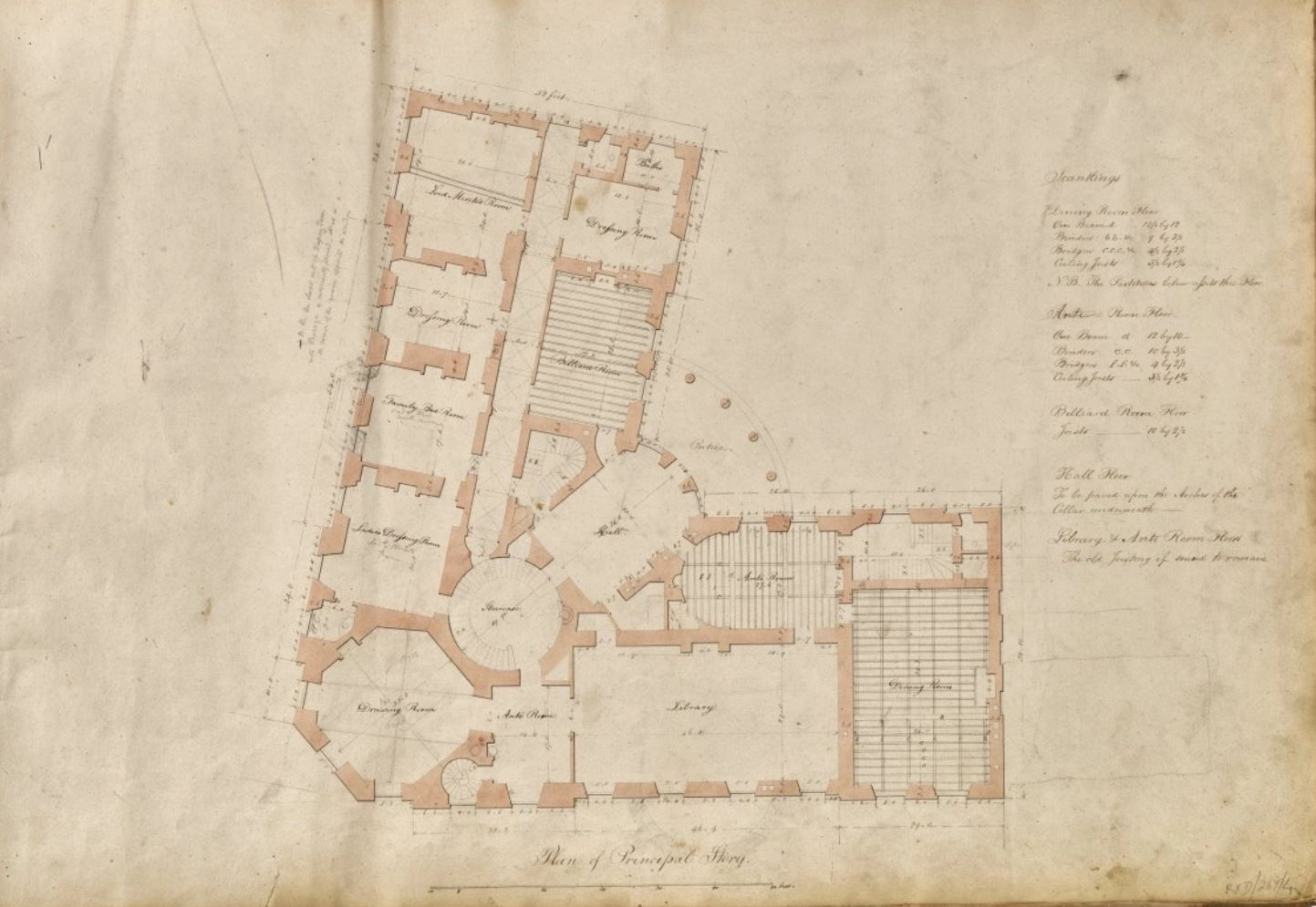
Plan of the main floor

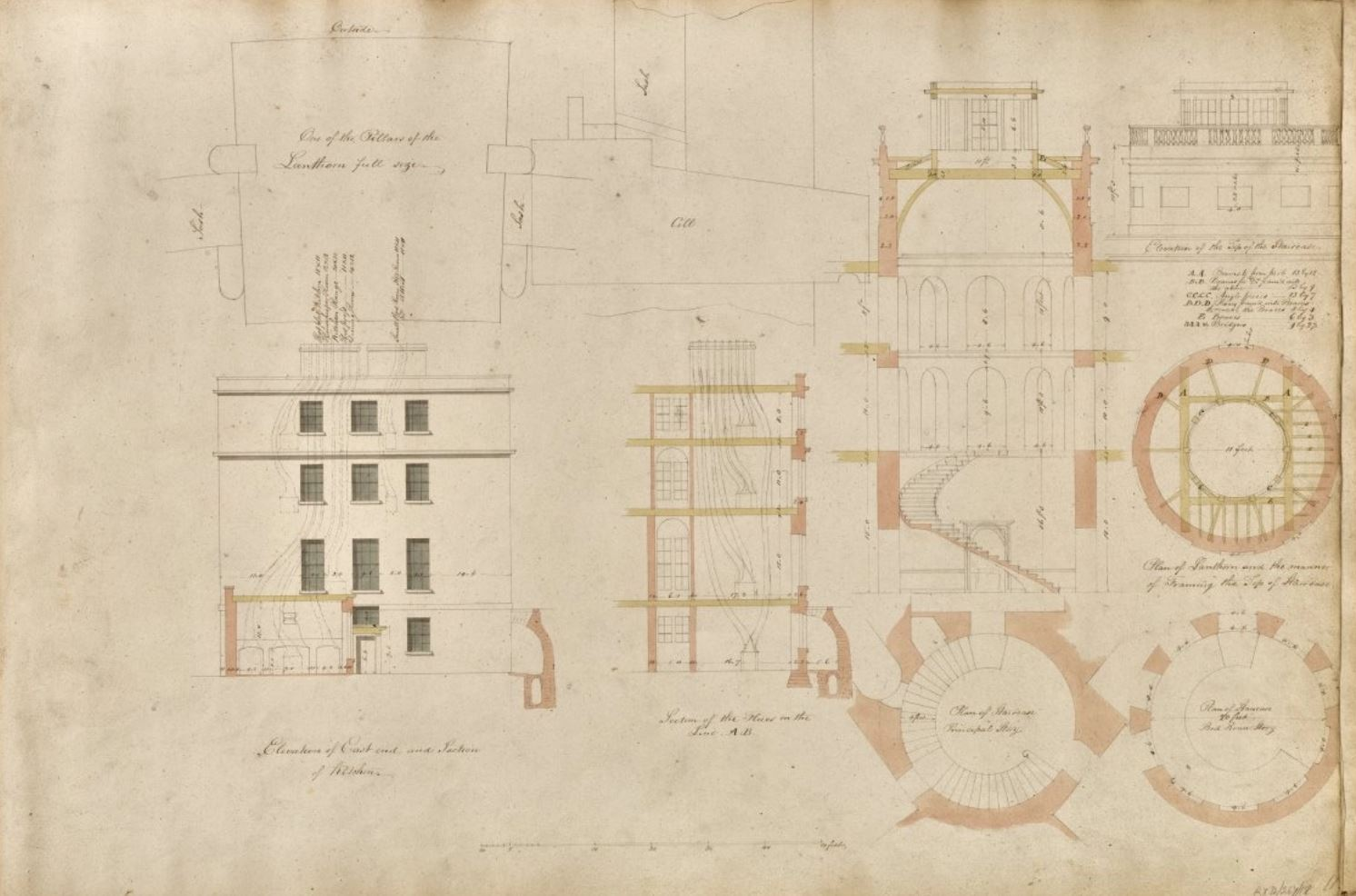
Cross section of the staircase

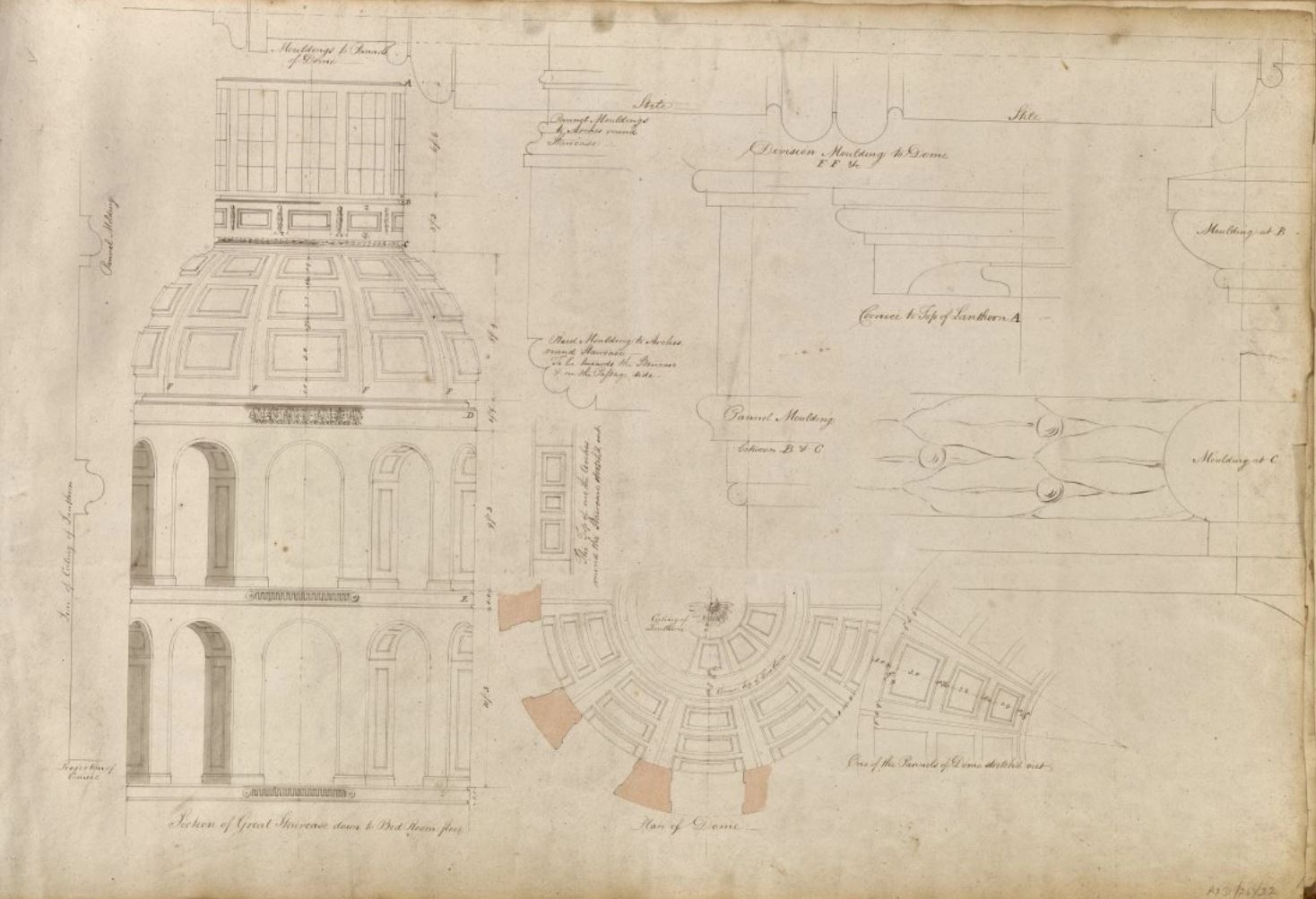
Cross section of the staircase dome

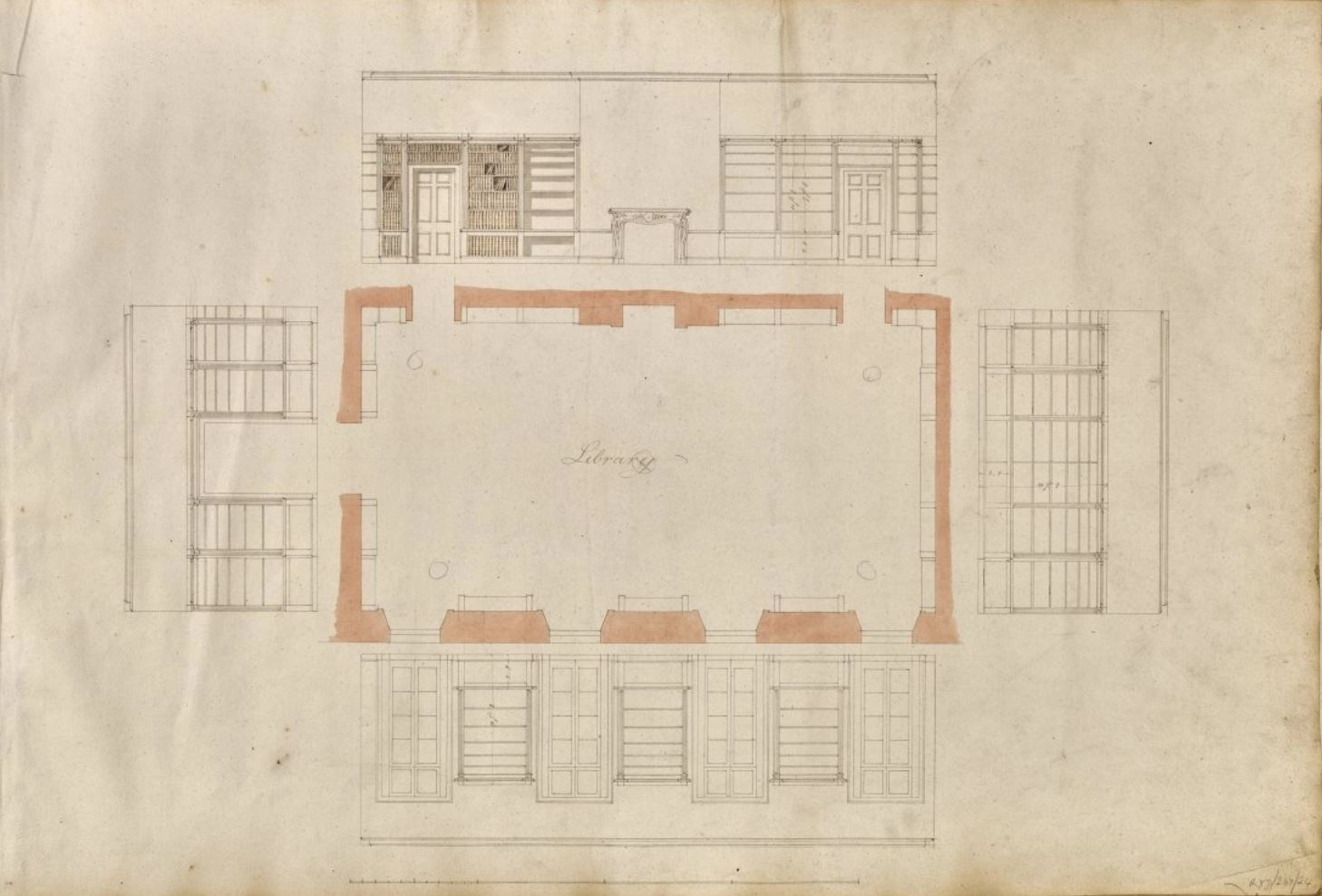
The library plan

Further alterations were undertaken in 1837 by William Playfair, one of the leading Scottish architects of the period. His work continued the architectural development of the house within the prevailing idiom of early nineteenth-century Scottish Neoclassical architecture, refining its external composition and internal organisation.

During the nineteenth and early twentieth centuries, members of the Elliot family held prominent positions within the British imperial administration. Gilbert Elliot-Murray-Kynynmound, 1st Earl of Minto (1751–1814) served as Governor-General of India from 1807 to 1813. Nearly a century later, Gilbert Elliot-Murray-Kynynmound, 4th Earl of Minto (1845–1914), who succeeded to the earldom in 1891, held office as Governor General of Canada from 1898 to 1904 and subsequently as Viceroy of India from 1905 to 1910.

In the late 19th or early 20th century, the house was further enlarged with the addition of a service wing attributed to Sir Robert Lorimer. Around 1906, Lorimer also designed formal garden terraces associated with the house.

=== 20th century: School use and decline ===
Following the Second World War, Minto House entered a new phase of institutional use. In 1952 the property was leased to Craigmount School, a girls’ boarding school, which subsequently purchased the house in 1962. The school closed in 1966.

After the closure of the school, the estate was bought back by the Earl of Minto, restoring it to family ownership. The house thereafter stood largely unoccupied and deteriorated significantly during the 1970s and 1980s.

=== The Minto House debacle: the demolition controversy (1992-1993) ===
By the late 1980s Minto House had fallen into advanced disrepair after decades of limited occupation. Weather ingress, vandalism and prolonged lack of maintenance accelerated structural deterioration, particularly to roofs, internal floors and masonry. Although proposals for restoration or redevelopment were periodically discussed, no comprehensive conservation scheme was implemented. The building's condition became increasingly precarious, and concerns were raised by both local authorities and heritage bodies regarding public safety and the preservation of what was regarded as an architecturally significant structure.

In March 1991 a proposal was announced to dismantle the building stone by stone for reconstruction in Japan as part of a country club development; this plan was abandoned in August 1992, reportedly owing to economic conditions. The 6th Earl of Minto was quoted at the time as stating that demolition would begin “next month”.

On 22 August 1992 the house was inspected by conservation representatives, who reported that despite the collapse of the centremost bays of the south elevation and areas of weathered stonework, the structural shell remained largely sound. Demolition works in fact commenced without public announcement on 25 August. On the morning of 27 August it was reported that demolition was under way and that fires were burning within the structure, affecting internal timbers. Later that afternoon Historic Scotland issued a press release confirming that the Secretary of State for Scotland, Ian Lang, had granted emergency (“spot”) Category A listed status to “Minto House and Garden Terraces”.

Lord Minto subsequently stated that professional advice had indicated that it would be unrealistic to attempt to render the structure safe and that demolition should proceed. On 31 August he applied for listed building consent to demolish. From 1 September 1992 a series of Dangerous Building Notices was served by the local authority, initially relating to the central core and substantial parts of the south elevation. Demolition resumed using heavy machinery within the courtyard, and further notices were issued as additional sections were deemed destabilised. Within days the central core and east wing had been largely removed, leaving the west wing, the Lorimer service wing and the garden terraces, together with a substantial mound of dismantled Category A listed masonry.

The case attracted national attention and became widely discussed within conservation circles. It has since been cited in debate concerning the use of Dangerous Building Notices, the responsibilities of owners of historic buildings, and the practical limits of statutory listing where significant deterioration has already occurred.

Following demolition, the site was cleared and later redeveloped. A new residence known as Old Parr House was constructed nearby. Only associated landscape features, including the early 20th-century garden terraces designed by Sir Robert Lorimer, survive as tangible reminders of the former house.

== Bibliography ==
- Coventry, Martin (2015). The Castles of Scotland. Prestonpans: Goblinshead. pp. 484–485. ISBN 9781899874569.
