= List of listed buildings in Minto, Scottish Borders =

This is a list of listed buildings in the parish of Minto in the Scottish Borders, Scotland.

== List ==
Name	Location	Date listed	Grid ref. (Note: Sometimes known as OSGB36, the grid reference (where provided) is based on the British national grid reference system used by the Ordnance Survey. • "Guide to National Grid". Ordnance Survey. • "Get-a-map". Ordnance Survey.)	Geo-coordinates	Notes	LB number (Note: Historic Environment Scotland assign a unique alphanumeric identifier to each designated site in Scotland, for listed buildings this always begins with "LB", for example "LB12345".)	Image
Teviotbank Stables Including Stables Cottage				55°27′26″N 2°42′43″W	Category C(S)	15236	Upload Photo
Minto House And Garden Terraces				55°28′35″N 2°40′45″W	Category A	19221	Upload Photo
Cleughhead, Minto Estate Former Dairy, Including Boundary Walls, Garden Steps, Gate And Gatepiers				55°28′48″N 2°40′32″W	Category B	50000	Upload Photo
Teviotbank				55°27′26″N 2°42′36″W	Category B	19733	Upload Photo
Fatlips Castle				55°28′48″N 2°39′47″W	Category B	15235	Upload Photo
Minto Parish Church (Church Of Scotland) With Graveyard, Boundary Walls, Gatepiers And Gates				55°28′23″N 2°41′14″W	Category B	15233	Upload another image
Minto War Memorial				55°28′22″N 2°41′17″W	Category B	51163	Upload Photo

== Key ==
The scheme for classifying buildings in Scotland is:

- Category A: "buildings of national or international importance, either architectural or historic; or fine, little-altered examples of some particular period, style or building type."
- Category B: "buildings of regional or more than local importance; or major examples of some particular period, style or building type, which may have been altered."
- Category C: "buildings of local importance; lesser examples of any period, style, or building type, as originally constructed or moderately altered; and simple traditional buildings which group well with other listed buildings."

In March 2016 there were 47,288 listed buildings in Scotland. Of these, 8% were Category A, and 50% were Category B, with the remaining 42% being Category C.
