= James Robertson (British Army officer) =

Civil governor of the Province of New York from 1779 to 1782

Lieutenant-General James Robertson

40th Governor of New York
- In office 1780 – 17 April 1783
- Monarch: George III
- Preceded by: William Tryon
- Succeeded by: Andrew Elliot (acting)

Personal details
- Born: 1717 Fife, Scotland
- Died: 4 March 1788 (aged 70–71) London, England
- Profession: Military officer, official

Military service
- Allegiance: Great Britain
- Branch/service: British Army
- Years of service: c. 1739–1788
- Rank: Lieutenant-General
- Battles/wars: War of the Austrian Succession; Jacobite Rising of 1745; French and Indian War; Siege of Louisbourg; Battle of Ticonderoga; Battle of Martinique; American Revolutionary War; Siege of Boston; Battle of Long Island

Lieutenant-General James Robertson (1717 – 4 March 1788) was a British Army officer and colonial official who served as the 40th Governor of New York from 1779 to 1783. He was a stage actor in his early adulthood.

== Life ==
Robertson was born in Newbigging, Fife, Scotland where he was baptized on 29 June 1717. He came to the American colonies in 1756 as a Major of the royal American troops under the command of the Earl of Loudoun. He became a lieutenant colonel in the 55th Regiment of Foot on 8 July 1758. After his service in the French and Indian War, he was influential in getting Parliament to establish the Quartering Act of 1765, which also gave Robertson the role of Barrackmaster General for the colonies, making him responsible for 27 barrackmasters from Saint Augustine to Louisbourg, Nova Scotia and Detroit, Michigan.

Robertson was promoted colonel and was the commander of the 60th Regiment of Foot in January 1776. He was commissioned Major General on 1 January 1776. He commanded the 6th brigade at the Battle of Long Island.

He was instrumental in fighting and stopping the Great Fire in 1776, which destroyed 500 homes and about 1/4 of Manhattan in September 1776. He returned to England in February 1777. He was appointed civil governor of New York in 1779, and arrived in New York City in March 1780, and was appointed Governor on 23 March 1780. He was commissioned Commander in Chief in North America on 4 February 1782. He was made a Lieutenant General on 20 November 1782. He issued a proclamation of Thanksgiving on 14 January 1783.

On 5 May 1783, he met with General Guy Carleton, General Henry Clinton, and Admiral Robert Digby, about the planning for the evacuation of New York City.

Leaving for England, Robertson was replaced as commandant of New York City by Major General James Pattison, and as governor by Lt. Gov. Andrew Elliot since 17 April 1783. Robertson died in London on 4 March 1788.

== Sources ==
- Ronald W. Howard (ed) The twilight of British rule in revolutionary America: the New York letter book of General James Robertson, 1780–1783, New York State Historical Association, 1983; ISBN 978-0-917334-12-2

Government offices
Preceded by William Tryon	Governor of New York; 1780–1783	Succeeded by Andrew Elliot; Acting
