= Flowers of the Forest =

Works based on a Scottish folk tune

Flowers of the Forest, or The Fluuers o the Forest (Roud 3812), is a Scottish folk tune and work of war poetry commemorating the defeat of the Scottish army, and the death of James IV, at the Battle of Flodden in September 1513. Although the original words are unknown, the melody was recorded c. 1615–1625 in the John Skene of Halyards Manuscript as "Flowres of the Forrest", although it might have been composed earlier.

Several versions of words have been added to the tune, notably Jean Elliot's lyrics in 1756 or 1758. Others include those by Alison Cockburn below. However, many renditions are played on the great Highland bagpipe. Due to the content of the lyrics and the reverence for the tune, it is one of the few tunes that many pipers will perform in public only at funerals or memorial services, with play otherwise limited to private practice or to instruct other pipers.

== The air ==
The tune is a simple modal melody. Typical of old Scottish tunes it is entirely pentatonic, with the dramatic exception of the 3rd and 5th notes of the second line which are the flattened 7th.

== Jean Elliot's lyrics ==
Jean Elliot (b. 1727), aided in part by popular poetry selections, framed the tune in 1756 as a lament to the deaths of James IV, many of his nobles, and over 10,000 men – the titular "Flowers of the Forest" – at the Battle of Flodden Field in northern England in 1513, a significant event in the history of Scotland.

She published it anonymously and it was at the time thought to be an ancient surviving ballad. However, Burns suspected it was an imitation, and together with Ramsay and Sir Walter Scott eventually discovered its author.

The song, written in Scots, is also known as The Floo'ers o' the Forest (are a' wede away) and describes the grief of women and children at the loss of their young men. In some ways the song echoes the Old Welsh poem Y Gododdin about a similar defeat in about 600.

Solo bagpipe versions of the song are used at services of remembrance, funerals, and other occasions; many in the Commonwealth know the tune simply as "The Lament" which is played at Remembrance Day or Remembrance Sunday ceremonies to commemorate war dead.

The first verse of the song contrasts happier times with grief at the losses:

I've heard the lilting, at the yowe-milking,
Lassies a-lilting before dawn o' day;
But now they are moaning on ilka green loaning;
"The Flowers of the Forest are a' wede away".

...

Dool and wae for the order sent oor lads tae the Border!
The English for ance, by guile wan the day,
The Flooers o' the Forest, that fought aye the foremost,
The pride o' oor land lie cauld in the clay.

The song is mentioned in The Scots Musical Museum as The flowres of the Forrest, and the air (or tune) apparently survived, but several versions of the words were written down later, the most usual being by Jean Elliot published about 1755 – see links below.

== Alison Cockburn's lyrics ==
In 1765 the wit and socialite Alison Cockburn published her lyrics to the Flowers of the Forest beginning "I've seen the smiling of Fortune beguiling" said to have been written before her marriage in 1731 . It concerns a financial crisis that had ruined the fortunes of a number of the Selkirk Lairds. Later biographers, however, think it probable that it was written on the departure to London of a certain John Aikman, with whom Alison appears to have had an early attachment.

The first verse runs:

I've seen the smiling
Of fortune beguiling,
I've tasted her pleasures
And felt her decay;
Sweet is her blessing,
And kind her caressing,
But now they are fled
And fled far away.

== Modern usage ==
It was played by two pipers as HM Queen Victoria's body was carried in procession from Osborne House on its way to Windsor for her funeral in 1901.

The piece was played by Pipe Major Colour Sergeant Peter Grant of The Highlanders, Royal Regiment of Scotland at the funeral of HRH Prince Philip, The Duke of Edinburgh on Saturday, April 17, 2021 and again in tribute on Friday, September 9, 2022 by a lone piper, Pipe Sergeant Parsons of the London Scottish, at the memorial service of HM Queen Elizabeth II. It was again played by a lone piper as her body left St Giles's Cathedral in preparation for its journey to London. As per royal tradition, the piece was played by the mass pipes and drums of the Irish and Scots Guards, at the last stage of the state funeral procession, when the Queen's coffin was brought down the hill from Windsor Castle to the lower ward and St. George's Chapel. Traditionally, the piece has always been played for this stage of a monarch's state funeral.

In late 1942, according to the late Duchess of Windsor's memoir The Heart Has Its Reasons, The Duke of Windsor asked that it be played at the funeral of his brother, Prince George, Duke of Kent, who was killed in a plane crash in the Scottish Highlands. Apparently it was a personal favourite of the Duke of Kent.

It is the official lament of the Canadian Armed Forces, played to honour dead members of the service.

It was standard practice in the British and Canadian military to use this tune to mark the death of a soldier serving in Afghanistan during the official memorial service.

An excerpt from J. Elliot's lyrics to this song was used in John McGrath's play Border Warfare (1989).

The English folk-rock band Fairport Convention covered the song on their 1970 album Full House.

The tune was played by a lone piper at the funeral of singer/songwriter Sandy Denny.

The track 'Flowers of the Town' by the English folk band The Unthanks is based on this song but it laments the loss of young men in the First World War. The lyrics of this version are almost identical to the first of "Two Songs" by Cecil Day-Lewis.

In 2007, Scottish singer Isla St Clair was invited to sing Flowers of the Forest at Tyne Cot Cemetery in Flanders, Belgium to commemorate the 90th anniversary of the Battle of Passchendaele, in the First World War. The ceremony was attended by Queen Elizabeth II and Queen Paola, as well as other European Heads of State and Commonwealth Representatives. She also recorded the lament in 1998, for the album When the Pipers Play and again in 2011, for the Scots Guards album From Helmand To Horse Guards.

Both versions of the song are part of the traditional music at Selkirk Common Riding which in part commemorates the loss at Flodden. Jean Elliot's version is known in the town as "The Liltin" and is played after the Casting of the Colours ceremony. Alison Cockburn's version is played as a march by the town band but is also the version more often sung; it is the version known in Selkirk as "The Flo'ers o' the Forest".

Scots/Australian singer-songwriter Eric Bogle refers to "Flowers of the Forest" in his song "No Man's Land", in which he muses over the grave of a World War I soldier, and wonders whether "Flowers of the Forest" and "Last Post" were played at the soldier's burial. English folk singer June Tabor recorded Bogle's song, followed by an instrumental version of "Flowers of the Forest", on the album Ashes and Diamonds (1977).

Australian singer-songwriter Graham Dodsworth recorded a version of the song with Irish/Australian singer Claire Peters on his 1998 folk music album In Good King Arthur's Day.

The song is heavily referenced in the novel Sunset Song by Lewis Grassic Gibbon and features in the 2015 film of the same name, including a rendition by Agyness Deyn, who plays the lead character, Chris Guthrie.

Scottish tenor Kenneth McKellar recorded a version of the song.

Michael Nyman speeded up the song and re-edited it as part of the score for The Piano.

English musician Mike Oldfield covered the song on his 1996 album, Voyager.

The song is quoted at the beginning and end of the historical novel The Flowers of the Forest by Elizabeth Byrd, which culminates in the Battle of Flodden.

The Australian War Memorial uses the song during its Last Post ceremony.

== The Forest ==
The Forest was a district and Royal forest comprising Selkirkshire (alternatively known as Ettrick Forest or the Shire of the Forest), large parts of Peeblesshire and parts of Clydesdale, known for its archers. The archers of Ettrick Forest earned the epithet "Flowers of the Forest" at the Battle of Falkirk in 1298, and formed the bodyguard of King James IV at Flodden, where their corpses were found surrounding their dead monarch.

== See also ==
- Teribus ye teri odin
