= January 1789 Speaker of the British House of Commons election =

- 5 January 1789
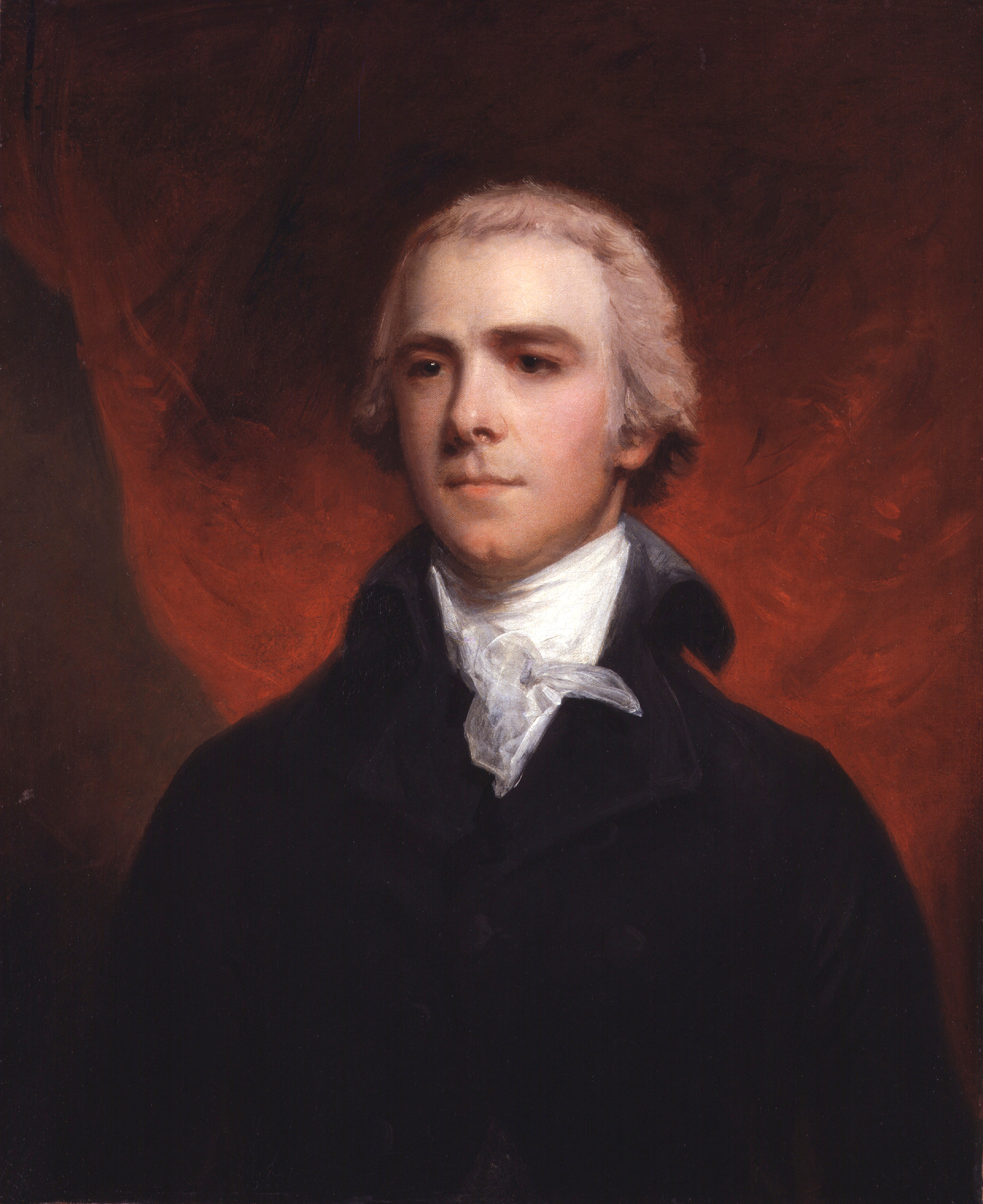

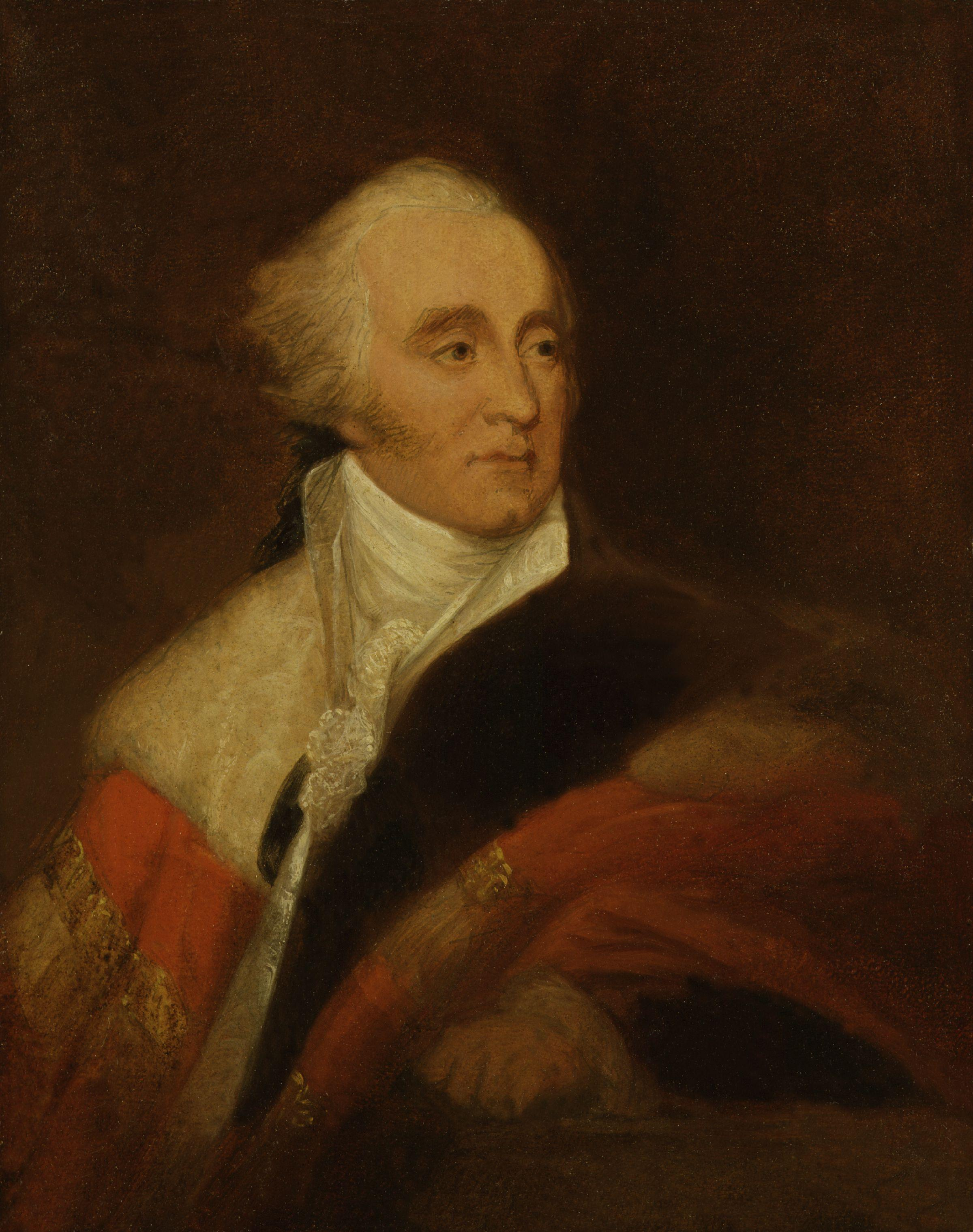
Candidate	William Wyndham Grenville	Sir Gilbert Elliot
Popular vote	215	144
Percentage	59.9%	40.1%
Candidate's seat	Buckinghamshire	Berwick
Speaker before election
Charles Wolfran Cornwall
Elected Speaker
William Wyndham Grenville

The January 1789 election of the Speaker of the House of Commons occurred on 5 January 1789.

The election followed the death of incumbent Speaker Charles Wolfran Cornwall.

William Wyndham Grenville was nominated by the Earl of Euston and seconded by William Pulteney.

Sir Gilbert Elliot was nominated by Welbore Ellis and seconded by Frederick Montagu.

Both candidates addressed the House.

On the motion "That the Right Honourable William Wyndham Grenville do take the chair of this House as Speaker," Grenville was elected by 215 votes to 144.
