= June 1789 Speaker of the British House of Commons election =

- 8 June 1789
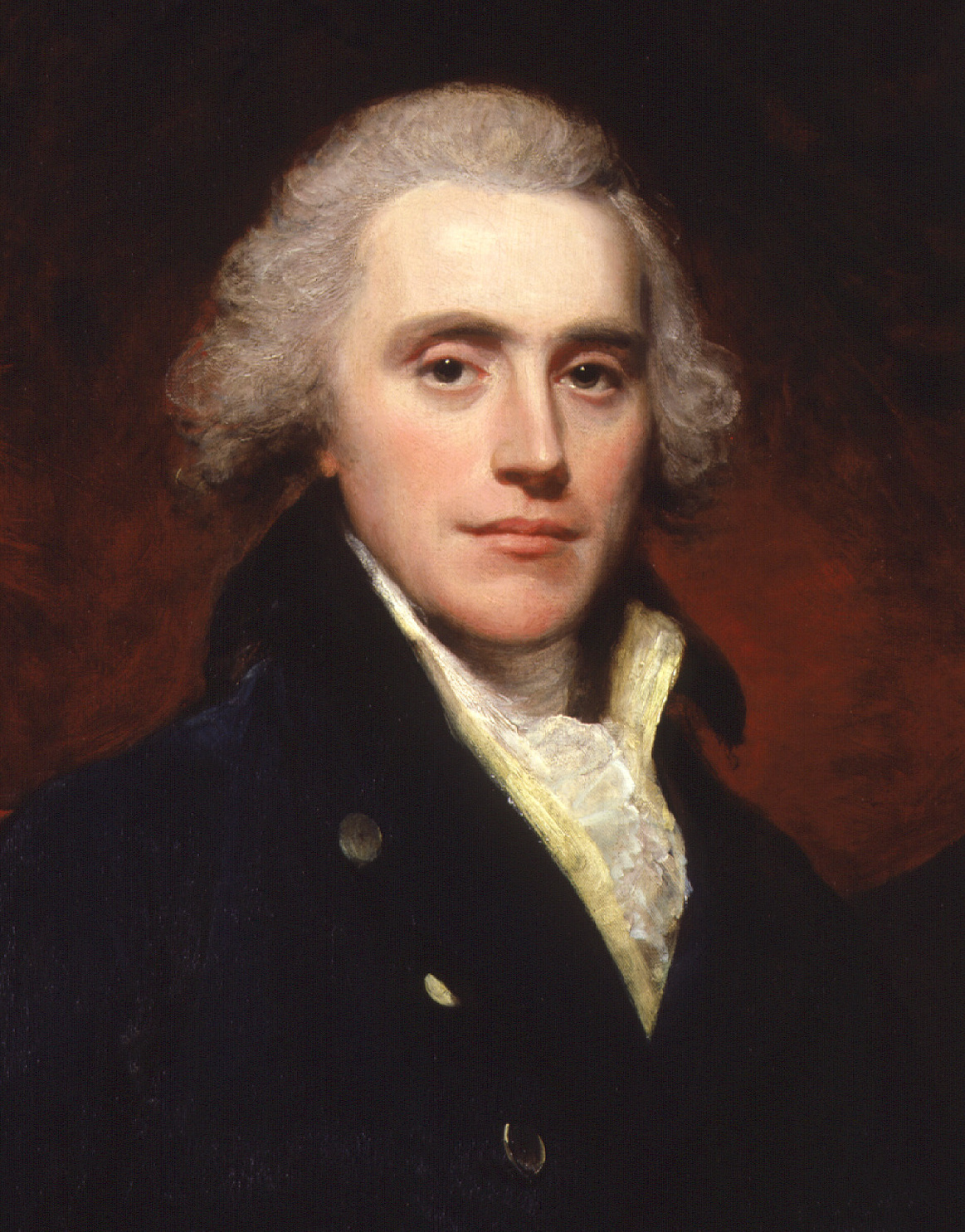

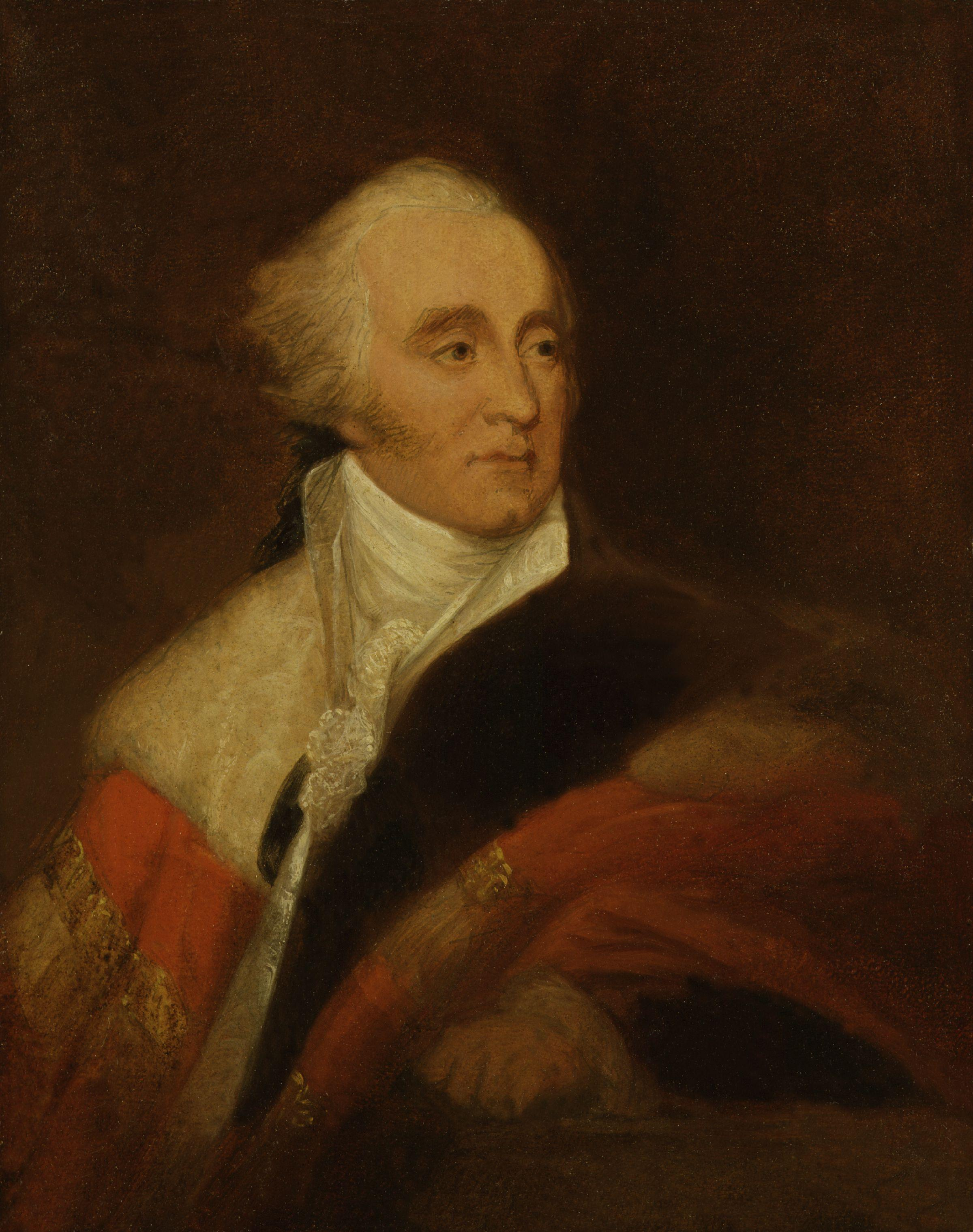
| Candidate | Henry Addington | Sir Gilbert Elliot |
| Popular vote | 215 | 142 |
| Percentage | 60.2% | 39.8% |
| Candidate's seat | Devizes | Berwick |
Speaker before election
William Wyndham Grenville
Elected Speaker
Henry Addington

The June 1789 election of the Speaker of the House of Commons occurred on 8 June 1789.

The incumbent Speaker William Wyndham Grenville, who had been in office for only five months, had resigned to take office as Home Secretary.

Henry Addington was proposed by the Marquess of Graham and seconded by Thomas Grosvenor.

Sir Gilbert Elliot (who had contested the previous election against Grenville) was proposed by Welbore Ellis and seconded by Frederick Montagu (as in the previous election).

Both candidates addressed the House, a debate followed.

On the motion "That Henry Addington, Esq. do take the Chair of this House as Speaker," Addington was elected by 215 votes to 142.
