= Gilbert Elliot-Murray-Kynynmound, 1st Earl of Minto =

British diplomat and politician (1751–1814)

The Right Honourable The Earl of Minto PC FRSE
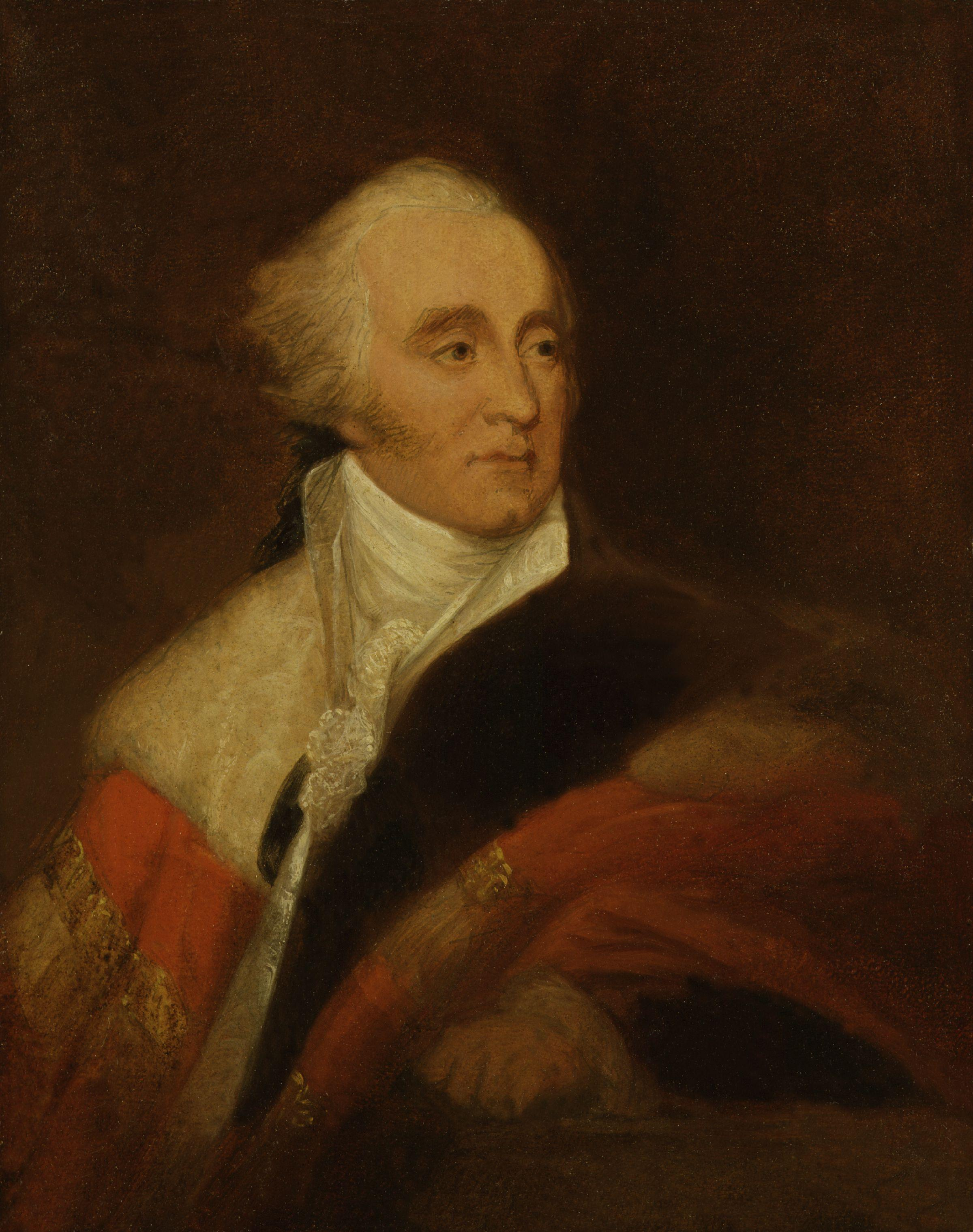
- Portrait by James Atkinson, c. 1822–1830

Governor-General of the Presidency of Fort William
- In office 31 July 1807 – 4 October 1813
- Monarch: George III
- Preceded by: Sir George Barlow (Acting Governor-General)
- Succeeded by: The Earl of Moira

President of the Board of Control
- In office 1806–1806
- Monarch: George III
- Preceded by: Viscount Castlereagh
- Succeeded by: Thomas Grenville

Viceroy of the Anglo-Corsican Kingdom
- In office 1794–1796
- Monarch: George III
- Preceded by: Office established
- Succeeded by: Office disestablished

Personal details
- Born: Gilbert Elliot; 23 April 1751 Edinburgh
- Died: 21 June 1814 (aged 63) Stevenage, Hertfordshire
- Resting place: Westminster Abbey
- Spouse: Anna Maria Amyand (m. 1777)
- Children: 6, including: Gilbert Elliot-Murray-Kynynmound, 2nd Earl of Minto; George Elliot; John Edmund Elliot
- Parents: Sir Gilbert Elliot, 3rd Baronet; Agnes Dalrymple-Murray-Kynynmound
- Education: University of Edinburgh; Christ Church, Oxford

Gilbert Elliot-Murray-Kynynmound, 1st Earl of Minto, PC, FRSE (/kɪˈnɪnmənd/; 23 April 1751 – 21 June 1814), known as Sir Gilbert Elliott, 4th Baronet until 1797, and the Lord Minto from 1797 to 1813, was a British diplomat and politician who sat in the House of Commons between 1776 and 1795. He was viceroy of the short-lived Anglo-Corsican Kingdom from 1794 to 1796 and went on to become Governor-General of the Presidency of Fort William between July 1807 and 1813.

== Background and education ==
Minto was born in Edinburgh, the eldest son of Sir Gilbert Elliot, 3rd Baronet, and Agnes, daughter of Hugh Dalrymple-Murray-Kynynmound. He was the nephew of John Elliott, Governor of Newfoundland; Andrew Elliot, the 41st Colonial Governor of New York; and Jean Elliot, the poet.

Hugh Elliot was his younger brother, and Sir Charles Elliot was his nephew. About 1763, Elliot and his brother Hugh were sent to Paris, where their studies were supervised by the Scottish philosopher David Hume, and where they became intimate with Honoré Mirabeau. Having passed the winters of 1766 and 1767 at the University of Edinburgh, Minto entered Christ Church, Oxford, and on quitting the university, he was called to the bar.

== Career ==
In 1776 Minto entered Parliament as an independent Whig MP for Morpeth. He became very friendly with Edmund Burke, whom he helped in the attack on Warren Hastings and Sir Elijah Impey, and was twice an unsuccessful candidate for the office of Speaker, in the elections of January 1789 and June 1789.

In 1793 he was appointed Civil Commissioner for Dunkirk, which was then under siege by Coalition forces. However, the siege proved unsuccessful, and the appointment perforce remained only on paper. Later he was given a similar appointment for Toulon, which proved similarly abortive.

He was sworn of the Privy Council in 1794, and in 1796 he was appointed as viceroy of the short-lived Anglo-Corsican Kingdom. In 1797 he assumed the additional names of Murray and Kynynmound and was created Baron Minto, of Minto in the County of Roxburgh. From 1799 to 1801 he was Envoy-Extraordinary to Austria, and having been for a few months President of the Board of Control, he was appointed Governor-General of the Presidency of Fort William at the end of 1806, with his term starting on 31 July 1807. The district of Minto in New South Wales, Australia (now a suburb of Sydney), was named after him in 1809. In 1810 he successfully requested the release of the British navigator, Matthew Flinders, from his six-year imprisonment on the Isle de France (Mauritius). He governed until 1813, during which he expanded the British presence in the area to the Moluccas, Java, and other Dutch possessions in the East Indies during the Napoleonic Wars. He was then created Viscount Melgund, of Melgund in the County of Forfar, and Earl of Minto, of Minto in the County of Roxburgh.

== Family ==
Minto married Anna Maria Amyand (26 March 1752 – 8 March 1829), daughter of Sir George Amyand, 1st Baronet and sister-in-law of Lord Malmesbury, in 1777. She was known as Lady Elliot, her formal title being Countess of Minto. The ship Lady Elliot, built in Bengal, India, in 1815, inspired its captain to name an island off the Queensland coast Lady Elliot Island. The ship was probably later wrecked on Lady Elliot Reef.

Their children were:

- Anna Maria (d. 18 October 1855) married Lt.-Gen. Sir Rufane Shaw Donkin. No issue.
- Harriet Mary Frances (d. July 1825). Died young.
- Gilbert, 2nd Earl Minto
- Admiral the Hon. Sir George Elliot
- Hon. John Elliot (b. 1788, d. 1862) was a politician.
- Catherine Sarah (circa 1798 – 25 June 1862), who married John Boileau, 1st Baronet. Had issue.

Lord Minto died at Stevenage, Hertfordshire, on 21 June 1814, aged 63, and was buried in Westminster Abbey, along with his brother Hugh. The inscription reads:

Gilbert Elliot, Earl of Minto eldest son of Sir Gilbert Elliot, Baronet. Born April 23, 1751, Viceroy of Corsica 1794, Envoy Extraordinary to Vienna 1779, President of the Board of Control 1806, Governor General of India 1806-13, created Baron Minto of Minto and Viscount Melgund and Earl of Minto. Died June 21, 1814.

He was succeeded in his titles by his eldest son, Gilbert.

== Arms ==
Coat of arms of Gilbert Elliot-Murray-Kynynmound, 1st Earl of Minto
Crest A dexter arm embowed issuant from clouds, throwing a dart, all proper.. Escutcheon Quarterly : 1st and 4th grand quarters, quarterly; 1st and 4th, argent, a hunting-horn sable, stringed gules, in the dexter chief point a crescent of the last; on a chief wavy azure, three mullets of the field (Murray of Melgund); 2nd and 3rd, azure, a chevron argent, between three fleurs-de-lis or (Kynynmound of that ilk); 2nd and 3rd grand quarters, gules, on a bend engrailed or, a baton azure, within a bordure vair (Elliot, of Minto); over all, a chief of augmentation argent, charged with a Moor's head couped in profile proper., being the arms of Corsica. Supporters Dexter, an Indian sheep, sinister, a fawn, all proper. Motto Non eget arcu (He needs not the bow); Below: Suaviter et fortiter (Mildy and firmly).

Parliament of Great Britain
Preceded by Peter Delmé; Hon. William Byron	Member of Parliament for Morpeth; 1776–1777; With: Peter Delme	Succeeded by Peter Delmé; John Egerton
Preceded by Sir Gilbert Elliot	Member of Parliament for Roxburghshire; 1777–1784	Succeeded by Sir George Douglas
Preceded by John Vaughan; John Delaval	Member of Parliament for Berwick; 1786–1790; With: John Vaughan	Succeeded by John Vaughan; Charles Carpenter
Preceded by Roger Wilbraham; James Bland Burges	Member of Parliament for Helston; 1790–1795; With: Stephen Lushington	Succeeded by Stephen Lushington; Charles Abbot
Diplomatic posts
Preceded by Sir Morton Eden	British Minister to Austria; 1799–1801	Succeeded by Arthur Paget
Government offices
New office	Viceroy of the Anglo-Corsican Kingdom; 1793–1796	British withdrawal
Preceded by Viscount Castlereagh	President of the Board of Control; 1806	Succeeded by Thomas Grenville
Preceded by Sir George Barlow (acting)	Governor-General of the Presidency of Fort William; 1807–1813	Succeeded by The Earl of Moira
Peerage of the United Kingdom
New creation	Earl of Minto; 1813–1814	Succeeded by Gilbert Elliot-Murray-Kynynmound
Peerage of Great Britain
New creation	Baron Minto; 1797–1814	Succeeded by Gilbert Elliot-Murray-Kynynmound
Baronetage of Nova Scotia
Preceded by Gilbert Elliot	Baronet (of Minto); 1777–1814	Succeeded by Gilbert Elliot-Murray-Kynynmound
