= Graham Dodsworth =

Australian folklorist, folk musician, and oral historian

Graham Dodsworth is an Australian folklorist, performer of folk songs, and an oral history interviewer for the National Library of Australia and the National Film and Sound Archive.

== Biography ==
Born 1956 in the Yallourn Hospital in Gippsland, Victoria, Graham Dodsworth lived his first five years in Moe after which his family moved to Vermont in the outer eastern suburbs of Melbourne, where he attended Vermont Primary and Secondary Schools. Dodsworth moved to Hawthorn in 1969 and while attending Kew High School first heard Danny Spooner conducting workshops demonstrating attitudes to the Industrial Revolution in England, transportation and other aspects of Australian history via folk song performance.

Dodsworth began a performance career in 1971 with performances at The Outpost Inn, Frank Traynors, The Dan O'Connell Hotel, and Fogarty's Union Hotel in Melbourne. In 2001 he achieved a Master of Arts degree in Australian Studies from Monash University, his thesis being entitled "The Nature of Folk Song in Australia: Origins and Transmission". He was awarded the 2005 National Library of Australia National Folk Festival Fellowship culminating in a concert in the Budawang Theatre at the National Folk Festival and in the foyer of the National Library of Australia in 2005.

Dodsworth demonstrated the results of the above-mentioned fellowship research at the 2007 Conference of the Australasian Sound Recording Association, which also explored representation and portrayal techniques by national institutions.

Dodsworth has written many articles for the Australian Folklore Journal Interviewed by Peter Parkhill for the Peter Parkhill sound collection in the National Library Dodsworth, Graham; Parkhill, Peter. (Interviewer) (1992), Graham Dodsworth interviewed by Peter Parkhill for the Peter Parkhill collection. Co-edited the publication, 'The Centre', 40 years of Banyule Community Health. Dodsworth, Graham, (editor.); Geary, Michael B., (editor.); Jones, Mia, (editor.); Wood, Keryn, 1956-, (editor.) (2015), The centre : 40 years of Banyule community health, West Heidelberg, Victoria Banyule Community Health, ISBN 978-0-646-94688-7
