= Jean Elliot =

Scottish poet

- Born: April 1727; Scotland
- Died: 29 March 1805 (aged 77); Monteviot House near Jedburgh
- Notable work: The Flowers of the Forest
- Parent(s): Sir Gilbert Elliot, 2nd Bt of Minto; Helen Stewart

Jean Elliot (April 1727 – 29 March 1805), also known as Jane Elliot, was a Scottish poet. She wrote one of the most famous versions of The Flowers of the Forest, a song lamenting the Scottish army's defeat in the Battle of Flodden. Published in 1776, it is her only surviving work. The lyrics are set to an earlier tune c. 1615–1625 in the John Skene of Halyards Manuscript as "Flowres of the Forrest."

== Life ==
Elliot was born at Minto in Teviotdale in the Scottish Borders, the third daughter of Sir Gilbert Elliot, 2nd Baronet of Minto, a lawyer, judge and politician. During the Jacobite rising of 1745, Jacobite soldiers came to Minto House seeking to arrest her father. Elliot reportedly entertained the officers and persuaded them that he was absent, while he was in fact hiding nearby in the Minto Crags.

Elliot never married. From 1782 until 1804 she lived in Brown's Square, Edinburgh, before returning to the Scottish Borders towards the end of her life. She died on 29 March 1805, aged 77.

=== The Flowers of the Forest ===
Elliot wrote her version of The Flowers of the Forest in the 18th century, probably as a private literary exercise. The poem laments the heavy Scottish losses at the Battle of Flooden, where King James IV and many members of the Scottish nobility were killed. It was published in 1776 and became own of the best known versions of the song.

Her words were associated with an older melody recorded in the early 17th century John Skene of Halyards manuscript. The song has remained part of Scottish commemorative tradition and has been used as a lament at funerals and memorial occasions.
