= Sir Gilbert Elliot, 2nd Baronet, of Minto =

Scottish lawyer and politician

The Right Honourable Sir Gilbert Elliot Bt

Lord Justice Clerk
- In office 1763–1766
- Preceded by: Lord Tinwald
- Succeeded by: Lord Glenlee

Member of Parliament for Roxburghshire
- In office 1722–1726
- Preceded by: William Douglas
- Succeeded by: Sir Gilbert Eliott, 3rd Bt, of Stobs

Personal details
- Born: c. 1693
- Died: 16 April 1766 (aged 72–73)
- Spouse: Helen Stewart
- Children: Gilbert Elliot; Jean Elliot; Andrew Elliot; John Elliot
- Parent: Sir Gilbert Elliot, 1st Baronet, of Minto
- Education: University of Utrecht

Sir Gilbert Elliot, 2nd Baronet, (of Minto) (c. 1693 – 16 April 1766) was a Scottish lawyer, politician and judge from Minto in the Scottish Borders. From 1763 until his death 3 years later, he was Lord Justice Clerk, the second most senior judge in Scotland.

== Early life ==
He was the oldest son of the judge Sir Gilbert Elliot, 1st Baronet, of Minto (c. 1650–1718). Elliot studied law at the University of Utrecht and was admitted to the Faculty of Advocates in 1715.

== Career ==
He was the Member of Parliament (MP) for Roxburghshire from 1722 to 1726 He was an eager agriculturist, and was one of the members of an Edinburgh "committee of taste for the improvement of the town." He was a keen supporter of the Hanoverian succession, in opposition to Jacobitism.

In June 1726, he was made a judge of the Court of Session, taking the judicial title Lord Minto. He became a Lord of Justiciary in 1733, and, in 1761, Keeper of the Signet. In 1763, he was promoted to Lord Justice Clerk.

== Personal life ==
In 1718, Elliot was married to Helen Stewart, the daughter of Sir Robert Steuart, 1st Baronet, who had been a member of the pre-union Parliament of Scotland. Together they were the parents of :

- Eleanor Elliot (1719–1797), who married John Rutherfurd in 1737.
- Sir Gilbert Elliot, 3rd Baronet (1722–1777), who married Agnes Dalrymple-Murray-Kynynmound, a daughter of Hugh Dalrymple-Murray-Kynynmound.
- Jean Elliot (1727–1805), a poet who never married.
- Andrew Elliot (1728–1797), a trader in British North America who served as acting colonial governor of the Province of New York in 1783; he married twice: Eleanor McCall in 1754; and after her death in 1756, to Elisabeth Plumsted, daughter of William Plumsted, in 1760.
- John Elliot (1732–1808), an admiral in the Royal Navy who never married.

Sir Gilbert died on 16 April 1766 and was survived by nine children.

=== Descendants ===
Through his eldest daughter Eleanor, he was a grandfather to John Rutherfurd, MP for Roxburghshire (who married Mary Ann Leslie, the only child of Maj.-Gen. Alexander Leslie), Elizabeth Rutherfurd (who married Andrew St Clair of Herdmanston, de jure 12th Lord Sinclair, parents of Charles St Clair, 13th Lord Sinclair) and Jane Rutherfurd (who married William Oliver of Dinlabyre).

Through his son Andrew, he was a grandfather of Eleanor Elliot (c. 1756–1830), who married James Jauncey Jr. and Admiral Robert Digby, Agnes Murray Elliot (1763–1860), who married Sir David Carnegie, 4th Baronet, and Elizabeth Elliot (c. 1764–1847), who married William Cathcart, 1st Earl Cathcart.

Parliament of Great Britain
Preceded by William Douglas	Member of Parliament for Roxburghshire; 1722–1726	Succeeded by Sir Gilbert Eliott, 3rd Bt, of Stobs
Legal offices
Preceded by Lord Tinwald	Lord Justice Clerk; 1763–1766	Succeeded by Lord Glenlee
Baronetage of Nova Scotia
Preceded by Gilbert Elliot	Baronet (of Minto); 1718–1766	Succeeded by Gilbert Elliot
