= Sir Gilbert Elliot, 1st Baronet, of Minto =

Scottish lawyer

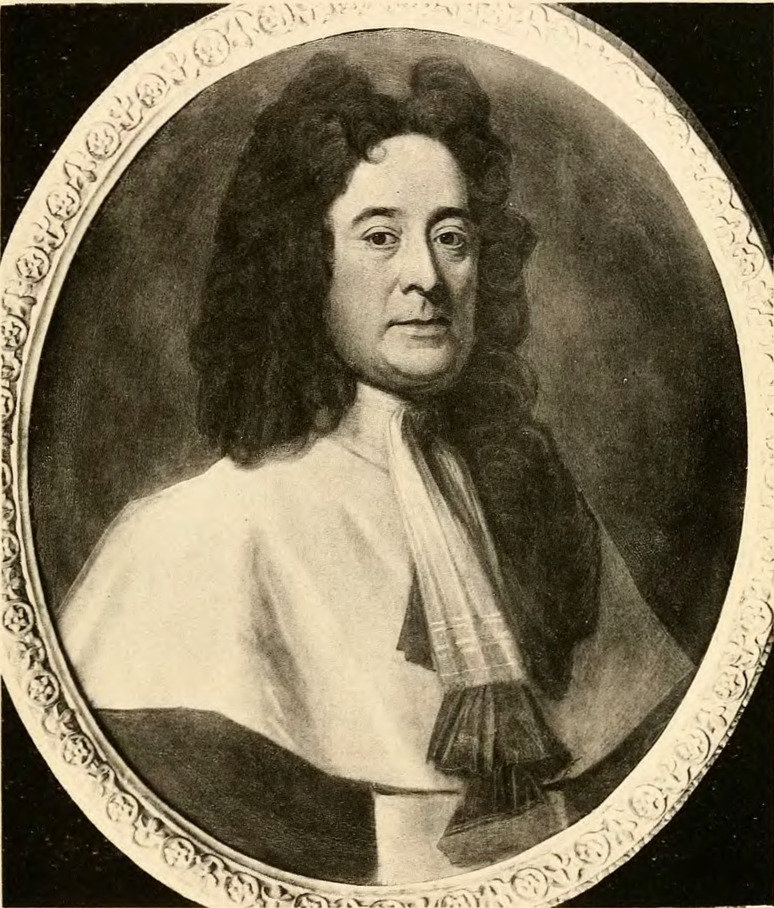
- Born: 1650
- Died: 1 May 1718 (aged 67–68)
- Alma mater: University of Edinburgh
- Occupation: Judge, politician
- Spouse(s): Helen Stevenson, Jean Carre
- Children: 3, including Gilbert
- Position held: Member of the Parliament of Scotland

Sir Gilbert Elliot, 1st Baronet, of Minto (c. 1650 – 1 May 1718) was a Scottish writer, lawyer, politician and judge from Minto in the Scottish Borders.

He was the younger son of Gavin Elliot of Midlem Mill, Roxburghshire, and his wife, Margaret Hay. He was educated at the University of Edinburgh.

Initially a writer, he began assisting in legal cases, helping William Veitch escape execution in 1679 as an opponent of King Charles II. After similarly helping the Earl of Argyll in 1681, Elliot went into exile in Europe in 1685, and in his absence was sentenced to death and forfeiture. He was pardoned by King James VII and returned to Scotland in 1687, where he was admitted to the Faculty of Advocates in 1688.

After the Glorious Revolution, the forfeiture was quashed in 1690. Elliot became a clerk to the Privy Council of Scotland, was knighted in 1692, and made a baronet, of Minto, in 1700.

He sat in the Parliament of Scotland for Roxburghshire from 1703 until the Parliament of Scotland and the Parliament of England were combined to form the Parliament of Great Britain in 1707, which he opposed. In 1703 he became a judge of the Court of Session, taking the judicial title of Lord Minto.

Elliot died at the age of 67 on 1 May 1718, and was succeeded in the baronetcy by his son Gilbert.

Baronetage of Nova Scotia
New creation	Baronet (of Minto); 1700–1718	Succeeded by Gilbert Elliot
