= Sir Gilbert Elliot, 3rd Baronet, of Minto =

Scottish statesman, philosopher and poet

The Right Honourable Sir Gilbert Elliot Bt
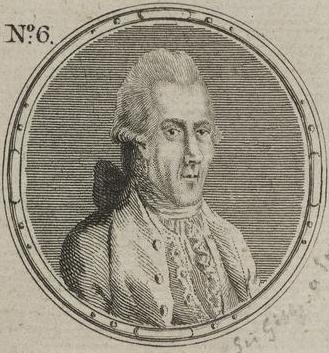

Member of the Great Britain Parliament for Selkirkshire
- In office 1753–1765
- Preceded by: John Murray
- Succeeded by: John Pringle

Treasurer of the Chamber
- In office 1762–1770

Member of the Great Britain Parliament for Roxburghshire
- In office 1765–1777
- Preceded by: Walter Scott
- Succeeded by: Sir Gilbert Elliot, Bt (son)

Treasurer of the Navy
- In office 1770–1777

Personal details
- Born: September 1722 Minto, Roxburghshire, Scotland
- Died: 11 February 1777 (aged 54) Marseille, France
- Spouse: Agnes Dalrymple-Murray-Kynynmound
- Children: 8
- Parent(s): Sir Gilbert Elliot, 2nd Baronet, of Minto and Helen Steuart
- Education: Edinburgh University; University of Utrecht

Sir Gilbert Elliot, 3rd Baronet, (of Minto) (September 1722 – 11 February 1777) was born at Minto, Roxburghshire, and was a Scottish statesman, philosopher and poet.

== Early life ==
Elliot was born in September 1722 in Minto, Roxburghshire. He was one of nine children born to Helen Steuart and Sir Gilbert Elliot, 2nd Baronet, of Minto.

He was educated at Dalkeith grammar school and from 1735 at Edinburgh University. A period of study at the University of Utrecht in 1743 was followed by a tour of the Netherlands and the German states during 1744 to 1745. Elliot was "a distinguished classical scholar" who claimed in a letter to another intimate companion, David Hume, to have "read over almost all the classics, both Greek and Latin". Elliot's friendship with Hume had begun while both were students at Edinburgh University. He was trained for the Scottish Bar, and passed Advocate on 10 December 1743.

== Career ==
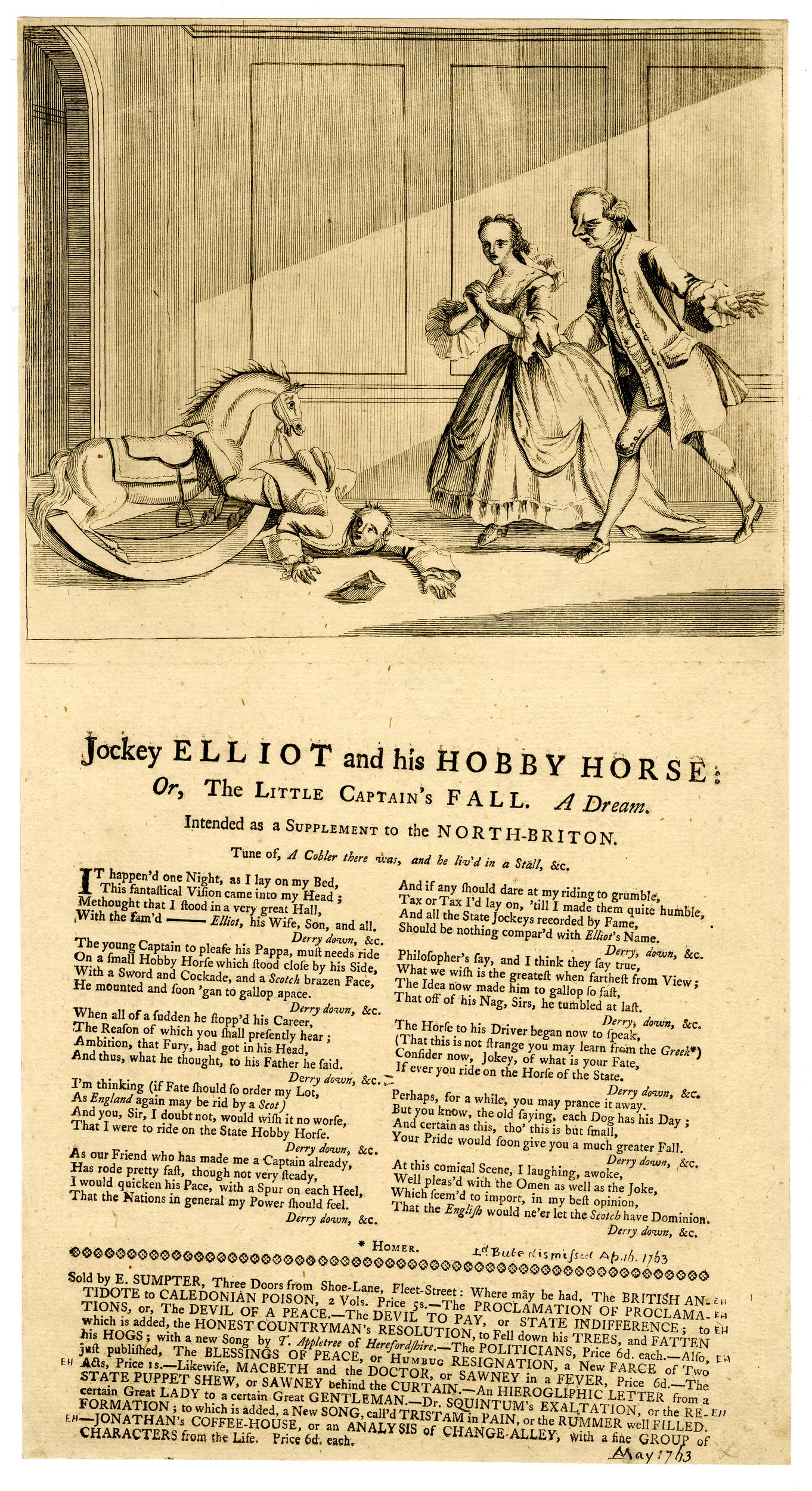
Satire on Sir Gilbert (Jockey Elliot), a supporter and beneficiary of Lord Bute: Eliot is shown entering a room with his wife, alarmed to find their son (also Gilbert Elliot, the future Earl of Minto) falling from a rocking-horse

In March 1748, Elliot was appointed as the first sheriff-depute of Roxburghshire, one of the judges introduced in Scotland by legislation passed in the wake of the Jacobite rising of 1745, a post he held until 1753. Elliot then served in the House of Commons as Member of Parliament for Selkirkshire from 1753 to 1765, and again for Roxburghshire from 1765 to 1777 during which period his father died on 16 April 1766, and he inherited the Baronetcy.

In parliament, he was a supporter of the policies of King George III in the American colonies. His Papers concerning the Boston Tea Party are in Harvard University Library. At one time he was a candidate for the Speaker's Chair in the House of Commons. He was made a Lord of the Admiralty in 1756, a position he held until his resignation in support of William Pitt in April 1757, and to which he was reinstated in June with Pitt's return to office

Elliot was Treasurer of the Chamber in the Royal Household from 1762 to 1770. He was appointed Treasurer of the Navy in 1770 in Lord North's government, and after was appointed Keeper of the Signet in Scotland in 1767. Elliot was a friend and follower of the Earl of Bute. Horace Walpole said Elliot was "one of the ablest members of the House of Commons". As a politician Elliot was best remembered for performances such as that during the militia debate in 1760 which, again according to Walpole, placed him in an élite group of mid- to late-century parliamentarians who displayed "the various powers of eloquence, art, reasoning, satire, learning, persuasion, wit, business, spirit and plain common sense".

=== Writing career ===
Elliot was the author of Amynta, which Sir Walter Scott described as "the beautiful pastoral song", and which began:

My sheep I neglected; I broke my sheep-hook
And all the gay haunts of my youth I forsook;

Other works by Elliot include Twas at the hour of dark midnight, describing the death of Colonel James Gardiner (1686–1745) during the Battle of Prestonpans, published in the third volume of 'The Scots Musical Museum' and Thoughts occasioned by the funeral of the earl and countess of Sutherland in Holyrood House which appeared anonymously in the Scots Magazine for October 1766.

In 1752, supported by Edinburgh's Lord Provost George Drummond, he authored a pamphlet entitled Proposals for carrying on certain Public Works in the City of Edinburgh. The advocated improvements were fully implemented by the Town Council and shaped the physical character of the city, as still seen to this day.

== Personal life ==
On 14 December 1746, Gilbert was married to Agnes Dalrymple-Murray-Kynynmound, daughter and heiress of Hugh Dalrymple-Murray-Kynynmound of Melgund, County of Forfar, and Kynynmound, County of Fife. They lived at Browns Square in Edinburgh, and were the parents of eight children, including:

- Gilbert Elliot-Murray-Kynynmound, 1st Earl of Minto (1751–1814), who married Anna Maria Amyand, daughter of Sir George Amyand, 1st Baronet, in 1777.
- Hugh Elliot (1752–1830), who married Charlotte von Kraut in 1778. They divorced in 1783 and he married Margaret Jones in c. 1792.
- Alexander Kynymound Elliot (1754–1778)
- Robert Elliot (1755–1825), who married Mary Garforth, the daughter of Rev. Edmund Garforth, in 1788.
- Eleanor Elliot (1758–1818), who married William Eden, 1st Baron Auckland.

On 11 February 1777, Elliot died in Marseille, France, where he had gone to recover his health.

Parliament of Great Britain
Preceded by John Murray	Member of Parliament for Selkirkshire; 1753–1765	Succeeded by John Pringle
Preceded by Walter Scott	Member of Parliament for Roxburghshire; 1765–1777	Succeeded by Sir Gilbert Elliot, Bt (son)
Baronetage of Nova Scotia
Preceded by Gilbert Elliot	Baronet (of Minto); 1766–1777	Succeeded by Gilbert Elliot
