= Minto, Scottish Borders =

Coordinates: 55.473430°N 2.6868331°W

Minto
- Location within the Scottish Borders
- Population: 322
- OS grid reference: NT5668020171
- Council area: Scottish Borders
- Lieutenancy area: Roxburgh, Ettrick and Lauderdale
- Country: Scotland
- Sovereign state: United Kingdom
- Post town: Hawick
- Postcode district: TD9 8SG
- Dialling code: 01450
- Police: Scotland
- Fire: Scottish
- Ambulance: Scottish
- UK Parliament: Berwickshire, Roxburgh and Selkirk
- Scottish Parliament: Ettrick, Roxburgh and Berwickshire

Minto is a village and parish in the Scottish Borders area of Scotland in Roxburghshire county. It is located 6 miles (10 kilometres) north-east of Hawick, north of the River Teviot.

== Etymology ==
The name consists of Cumbric *mïnïδ ("mountain") and Old English hōh (“hill spur, promontory”), neighbouring areas were recorded as Munethov in 1166 and Mynetowe in 1296.

== Geography ==
The parish is bounded on the west by the former parish of Wilton (united with Hawick in 1895), on the north by Lilliesleaf, on the east by Ancrum and on the south by the parish of Cavers, whose boundary partially follows the River Teviot, and the village of Denholm within that parish. Fatlips Castle and Hassendean are within the parish.

Minto village is a Conservation Area as designated by Scottish Borders Council.

Minto House, the former seat of the Earls of Minto, which became derelict over the decades, was demolished in 1992.

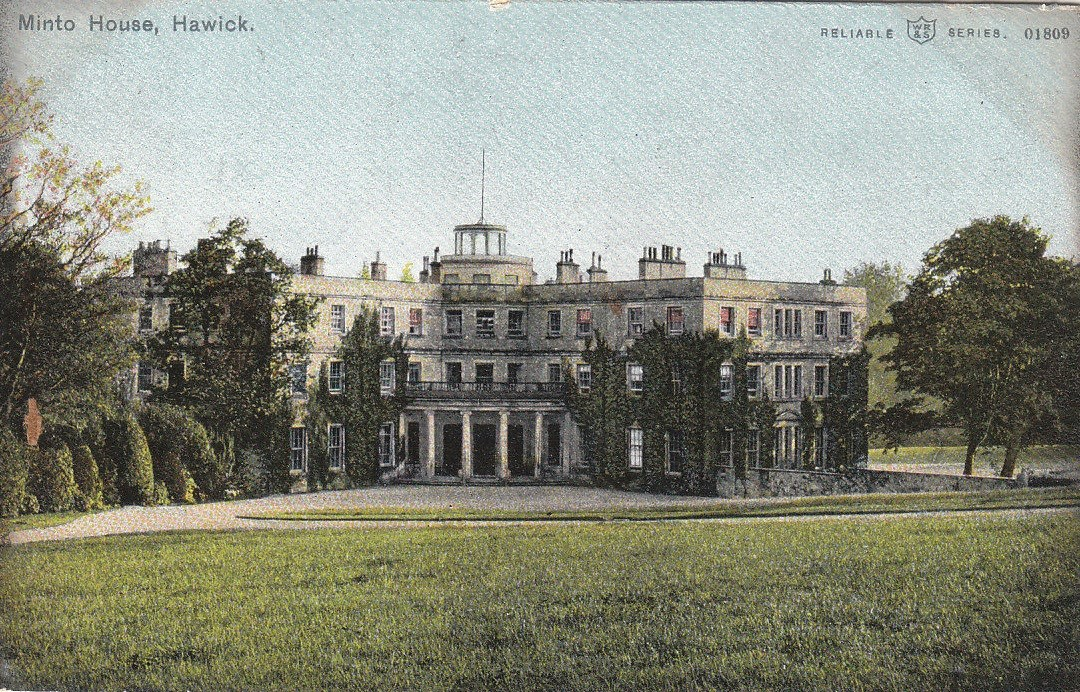
Minto House, circa 1910, demolished 1992

The demolition occurred under very dubious circumstances with the owner being chair of the planning committee.

Minto comes within the area of Denholm and District Community Council, whose area north of the Teviot is roughly the same area as Minto civil parish, except for the Appletreehall area in the west. Appletreehall is a hamlet of Wilton parish.

The civil parish has an area of 5,601 acres (2,267 hectares).

== Demographics ==
The population was 322 in 2011. The population of Minto village was estimated at 58 based on the 2001 Census.

== History ==
Minto first appears in 1383 as a barony in a list of rentals paid to Roxburgh Castle. It was burned in a raid about 1490, then again in 1545 along with most of the surrounding area. It was in possession of the Turnbull family. It was later sold to Sir Gilbert Elliot (c. 1650–1718), the ancestor of the Earls of Minto, who was made a Baronet by King William in 1700.

Hassendean, the valley of Hassendean Burn, lies in the western part of the parish and was its own parish until shortly after the Reformation. The use of its church was suppressed in 1690 and the building gradually became dilapidated, lying next to the banks of the Teviot. Its churchyard continued in use until 1796 when it was swept away by a flood.

The old village stretched in a staggered line along a north-west axis near the old church. Another cluster of houses stood on the roadside near West Lodge; one was occupied by the village cooper, giving rise to the Cooper's Brae. The village had a change house, a public host house, a brew-house (supplied by local barley malted nearby), a school (established in the 17th century) and a shop. Lint fields behind Minto Crags were used to produce linen, while Minto Moss, Langhope, and Shielswood provided peats for fuel. There was also a mill near South Lodge on the Ancrum road, fed by a cauld above Spittal Ford.

Between 1827 and 1831, the village was moved in its entirety at the behest of Gilbert Elliot-Murray-Kynynmound, 2nd Earl of Minto, who did not wish to see the village from his mansion, the Minto House. The new village was designed and laid out by William Playfair within the Earl's estate. It occupies an elevated ridge overlooking the River Teviot and lies in a dip below Minto Hill, which is 905 feet (276 metres) high.

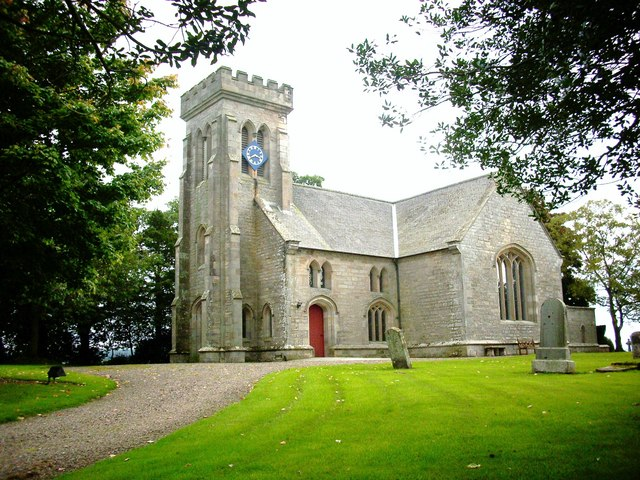
Minto Church

Minto Church, designed in 1831 by William Henry Playfair, is a Gothic revival church with a large three-stage tower. It was built during the ministry of Rev David Aitken who served as minister from 1829 to 1866 and replaced an earlier church. The interior was renovated in 1934, but the exterior remains largely unchanged.

Minto War Memorial is a listed building situated near the church in the centre of Minto. It was built in 1921 by locally born sculptor Thomas J Clapperton and is a bronze statue of a British soldier, commemorating the First World War.

The Minto House was the Earl of Minto's mansion. Garden terraces were added by Robert Lorimer in 1904. In 1992, Minto House was listed as Category A, but was promptly demolished within weeks of the listing after it was found that the structure, which had been left abandoned since 1966, had since become too dangerous to remain standing.

== See also ==
- List of listed buildings in Minto, Scottish Borders
