= John Rutherfurd (Roxburghshire MP) =

Member of Parliament for Roxburghshire
- In office 1806–1812
- Preceded by: Sir George Douglas
- Succeeded by: Gilbert Elliot-Murray-Kynynmound

Member of Parliament for Selkirkshire
- In office 1802–1806
- Preceded by: Mark Pringle
- Succeeded by: William Eliott-Lockhart

Personal details
- Born: 1748
- Died: 6 May 1834 (aged 85–86) Edgerston, Scotland
- Spouse: Mary Ann Leslie (after 1787)
- Relations: Walter Rutherfurd (uncle); John Rutherfurd (cousin); Sir Gilbert Elliot, 2nd Baronet, of Minto (grandfather); Charles St Clair, 13th Lord Sinclair (nephew)
- Parent(s): John Rutherfurd; Eleanor Elliot

John Rutherfurd of Edgerston (1748 – 6 May 1834) was a Scottish soldier and politician.

== Early life ==
Rutherfurd was born in New York in 1748. He was the only son of John Rutherfurd (1712–1758) and Eleanor (née Elliot) Rutherfurd (1719–1797). John had two sisters, Elizabeth Rutherfurd (who married Andrew St Clair of Herdmanston, de jure 12th Lord Sinclair, parents of Charles St Clair, 13th Lord Sinclair) and Jane Rutherfurd (who married William Oliver of Dinlabyre). After serving as an MP for Roxburghshire, his father served in the Royal American Regiment during the Seven Years' War, but was killed at Fort Ticonderoga during the Battle of Carillon in 1758.

His maternal grandparents were Helen (née Stewart) Elliot and Sir Gilbert Elliot, 2nd Baronet, of Minto, the Lord Justice Clerk. Among his maternal family members were his uncles Sir Gilbert Elliot, 3rd Baronet, Andrew Elliot (who served as acting colonial governor of the Province of New York in 1783), and Admiral John Elliot of the Royal Navy and aunt Jean Elliot, a prominent poet. His paternal grandparents were Sir John Rutherfurd of Rutherfurd and Edgerston, and Elizabeth (née Cairncross) Rutherfurd. John was twelfth in descent from James Rutherfurd of Clan Rutherford, who was granted the manorial lands of Edgerston in 1492 by King James IV of Scotland. Among his paternal family was uncle Walter Rutherfurd, who moved to American and became a prominent merchant (and the father of U.S. Senator John Rutherfurd). Another uncle, Sir Robert Rutherfurd, was created a Baron of Russia by Catherine the Great in 1768.

He qualified as an advocate in 1770 and was admitted to Lincoln's Inn in 1771.

== Career ==
Rutherfurd declared his candidature for Roxburghshire (where his father had been member 50 years before) in 1787, under the aegis of the 3rd Duke of Buccleuch. "His unpopularity was reported to be as positive as that of the sitting Member, Sir George Douglas, was negative, for he was 'snappish, petulant and assuming'." He declined a compromise with his cousin Sir Gilbert Elliot, who ensured his defeat at the election of 1790. Soon after acquiring most of his father-in-law's fortune (who died in 1794), he assured Buccleuch in 1796 that although "his windfall enabled him to consider becoming county Member in place of Douglas, he preferred Douglas's continuing or the adoption of another candidate to coming in himself or swallowing Sir Gilbert Elliot’s return." Buccleuch accordingly considered him out of the question, but in 1802 procured his return for Selkirkshire.

In December 1803, he became vice-lieutenant in Roxburghshire. After becoming the Member for Roxburghshire in 1806, he took three leaves of absence from 29 April 1812 until the dissolution.

=== Edgerston ===
Since his father (who died in 1758) predeceased his grandfather (who died in 1764), upon the latter's death, sixteen year-old John succeeded to his grandfather's vast Scottish estates. He was also heir of his uncle, Baron Robert Rutherfurd of Fairnington.

Rutherfurd was known as a great benefactor to Edgerston. In 1793 he built on the two wings with their Venetian windows and the semi-circular tower at the south side of the house. In a letter written by his uncle, Baron Robert Rutherfurd to another uncle, Walter Rutherfurd, "Fairnington, Oct 28, 1788, Dear Walter, I want to send you a copy of the plan of the improvements that our nephew is making at Edgerston. He is putting on two wings at a cost of 3,000 and when it is completed it will be one of the finest seats in the Shire." In a letter between the same uncles, "Fairnington, Nov 26, 1792. Edgerston House by being repaired with additions is now one of the handsomest and most commodious of any in this county."

== Personal life ==
On 15 June 1787, Rutherfurd married Mary Ann Leslie, the only child of Maj.-Gen. Alexander Leslie and Mary (née Tullidelph) Leslie. Mary's father was a younger son of Alexander Leslie, 5th Earl of Leven.

As Rutherfurd had no children of his own, he settled the lands of Edgerston, on his nephew, William Oliver (the son of his sister Jane), who then styled himself William Oliver-Rutherfurd, who built the Tower at Edgerston in 1840.

Parliament of the United Kingdom
| Preceded by Mark Pringle | Member of Parliament for Selkirkshire; 1802–1806 | Succeeded by William Eliott-Lockhart |
| Preceded by Sir George Douglas | Member of Parliament for Roxburghshire; 1806–1812 | Succeeded by Gilbert Elliot-Murray-Kynynmound |
