= Hawick United F.C. =

Former association football club in Scotland

Hawick United
- Founded: 1925
- Dissolved: 1932
- Ground: Wilton Lodge
- President: G. Hogg
- Match secretary: John Crossan
Home colours

Hawick United F.C. was a football club from Hawick, Roxburghshire which played in the East of Scotland League during the 1920s and 1930s.

== History ==
The club was formed in 1925, making its bow with a 2–0 win over Stow Amateurs in October. It entered the Border Cup for the first time in the 1925–26 season, and continued to do so until 1930–31; United only ever won ties in one season, in 1926–27, when victories over Coldstream and Leith Amateurs put the club in the final, at Ettrick Park in Selkirk. United went down 2–0 to the Civil Service Strollers, the Strollers taking the lead through a second-half penalty.

Perhaps buoyed by this success, the club joined the Scottish Football Association in August 1927, entitling it to enter the Scottish Qualifying Cup. However its debut in the competition in September was also its only match, a 6–1 defeat at the Strollers (after Johnstone gave Hawick the lead) seemingly putting the team off renewing its Scottish FA membership.

The club played in the East of Scotland League from 1926–27 to 1930–31. However the club's record was poor, only once not finishing bottom (12th out of 16 in 1929–30). It also lost every tie it played in the King Cup over the same period.

The club's final season as a senior club was 1930–31, and United withdrew from the League after 8 games, having lost 7 of them, and being replaced by Jed Arts. United joined the Border Amateur League for the rest of the season.

United finished the 1930–31 season as runner-up in the Conan Doyle Cup, for amateur sides in the Borders area, losing to Chirnside in a final replay, having let slip a 3-goal lead in the original game at Galashiels. The last reference to the club playing is in a Borders Junior League match in March 1932, by which time it was playing the reserve sides of the clubs it used to meet on an even basis.

== Colours ==
The club wore black and white striped shirts with white shorts.

== Ground ==
The club played at Wilton Lodge.
