= John Rutherfurd (soldier) =

Major John Rutherfurd

Member of Parliament for Roxburghshire
- In office 1734–1742
- Preceded by: William Douglas
- Succeeded by: William Douglas

Personal details
- Born: 12 June 1712; Edgerston, Scotland
- Died: 8 July 1758 (aged 46); Ticonderoga, New York, British America
- Spouse: Eleanor Elliot (after 1737)
- Relations: Walter Rutherfurd (brother); John Rutherfurd (nephew); Robert Rutherfurd (brother)
- Children: 7, including John
- Parent(s): Sir John Rutherfurd; Elizabeth Cairncross

Major John Rutherfurd of Edgerston (12 June 1712 – 8 July 1758) was a Scottish soldier and politician.

== Early life ==
Rutherfurd was baptized 12 June 1712. He was the eldest surviving son of Sir John Rutherfurd of Rutherfurd and Edgerston, and his first wife, Elizabeth Cairncross, who married in 1710. His father was the head of an old Roxburgh family. Among his eighteen siblings was Walter Rutherfurd, who moved to American and became a prominent merchant. A younger brother, Sir Robert Rutherfurd, was created a Baron of Russia by Catherine the Great in 1768.

His paternal grandparents were Thomas Rutherfurd of Teviotdale and Susannah (née Riddell) Rutherfurd, and he was eleventh in descent from James Rutherfurd of Clan Rutherford, who was granted the manorial lands of Edgerston in 1492 by King James IV of Scotland. His maternal grandfather was William Cairncross of West Langlee, Roxburghshire.

He was educated at Lincoln's Inn in 1731 and became an advocate in 1734.

== Career ==
Soon after he came of age, he was returned unopposed for Roxburghshire in the Parliament of Great Britain. When the Frederick, Prince of Wales broke with the King in September 1737, Rutherfurd, as a member of the Squadrone or anti-Argyll faction in Scotland, received a circular letter from Lord Marchmont, then in opposition, urging his attendance at the opening of the new session. Rutherfurd voted against the Convention of Pardo in 1739, and was one of the opposition Whigs who voted against the motion of 13 February 1741 to dismiss Robert Walpole.

Rutherfurd was, again, returned unopposed in 1741, he was said to have been won over from the Opposition by the grant of an army commission in December, thereby vacating his seat.

=== Life in America ===
In December 1741, Rutherfurd was granted an Army commission as captain of an independent company of foot and left for the Province of New York. In 1745, he was appointed a member of the Executive Council of New York, serving in that body until his death. In 1746, he became a Major of the New York Forces and commanded an attack on the French at Fort Niagara in 1748.

In 1756, he was a Major of the Royal American Regiment during the Seven Years' War. He was killed at Fort Ticonderoga on July 8, 1758 during the Battle of Carillon.

== Personal life ==
On 27 November 1737, Rutherfurd married Eleanor Elliot (1719–1797) in Edinburgh. She was a daughter of Helen (née Stewart) Elliot and Sir Gilbert Elliot, 2nd Baronet, of Minto, the Lord Justice Clerk. Among her siblings were Sir Gilbert Elliot, 3rd Baronet, poet Jean Elliot, Andrew Elliot (who served as acting colonial governor of the Province of New York in 1783), and Admiral John Elliot of the Royal Navy Together, they were the parents of three sons and four daughters, including:

- John Rutherfurd (1748–1834), who married Mary Ann Leslie, a daughter of Maj.-Gen. Alexander Leslie (younger son of Alexander Leslie, 5th Earl of Leven), in 1787.
- Elizabeth Rutherfurd (c. 1740–1783), who married Andrew St Clair of Herdmanston, de jure 12th Lord Sinclair, in 1763.
- Jane Rutherfurd (1750–1820), who married William Oliver of Dinlabyre in 1771.

Since Rutherfurd died on 8 July 1758, before the death of his father, upon the senior Rutherfurd's death in 1764, he was succeeded by his grandson, John, who was only 16, as John Rutherfurd died before his father in 1758. As Rutherfurd's son had no children of his own, he settled the lands of Edgerston, on his nephew, William Oliver, the son of his sister Jane and William Oliver; who then styled himself William Oliver-Rutherfurd.

=== Descendants ===
Through his daughter Elizabeth, he was a grandfather of Lt.-Col. Charles St Clair, 13th Lord Sinclair (1768–1863), which title was confirmed in by the House of Lords in 1782. He sat in the House of Lords as a Scottish representative peer.

Parliament of Great Britain
Preceded by William Douglas	Member of Parliament for Roxburghshire; 1734–1742	Succeeded by William Douglas
