= Robert Rutherfurd =

Scottish merchant; Baron of the Russian Empire

Sir Robert Rutherfurd (31 May 1719 – 13 February 1794) was a Scottish merchant who was made a Baron of the Russian Empire.

== Early life ==
Rutherfurd was born on 31 May 1719. He was the fourth son of Sir John Rutherfurd of Rutherfurd and Edgerston, and his first wife, Elizabeth Cairncross, who married in 1710. His father was the head of an old Roxburgh family. Among his eighteen siblings were John Rutherfurd, MP for Roxburghshire, and Walter Rutherfurd, who moved to America and became a prominent merchant.

His paternal grandparents were Thomas Rutherfurd of Teviotdale and Susannah (née Riddell) Rutherfurd, and he was eleventh in descent from James Rutherfurd of Clan Rutherford, who was granted the manorial lands of Edgerston in 1492 by King James IV of Scotland. His maternal grandfather was William Cairncross of West Langlee, Roxburghshire.

== Career ==
Rutherfurd was a merchant and lived in Italy for 40 years before returning to Scotland in 1777. While in Italy, he was the Russian agent at Livorno and Tuscany, and had reportedly "made himself useful to Russia during her war with the Turks in 1770."

He was created a Baron of Russia by Catherine the Great in 1768 and was presented by the Empress with a gold enameled box richly set with diamonds.

== Personal life ==
Rutherfurd bought back the family estate, Fairnington, in 1779. The property had first been acquired by the Rutherfurds in 1647 from Francis Scott, 2nd Earl of Buccleuch. On the estate, he built an octagonal summerhouse and observatory with piended roof surmounted by iron finial known as "Baron´s Folly" or "Down Law".

Upon his death in 1794 without issue, he left his estate to his nephew, John Rutherfurd, an MP for Roxburghshire who married Mary Ann Leslie (the only child of Maj.-Gen. Alexander Leslie and a granddaughter of Alexander Leslie, 5th Earl of Leven). On John's death without issue in 1834, the estate passed to Charles Rutherfurd, son of Maj. John Rutherfurd of Mossburnford (the son of Sir Robert's brother Thomas Rutherford). It later passed to Charles' brother Thomas.
