= Camptown, Scottish Borders =

Village in Scottish Borders, Scotland

Coordinates: 55°24′53″N 02°30′29″W

Camptown
- Village
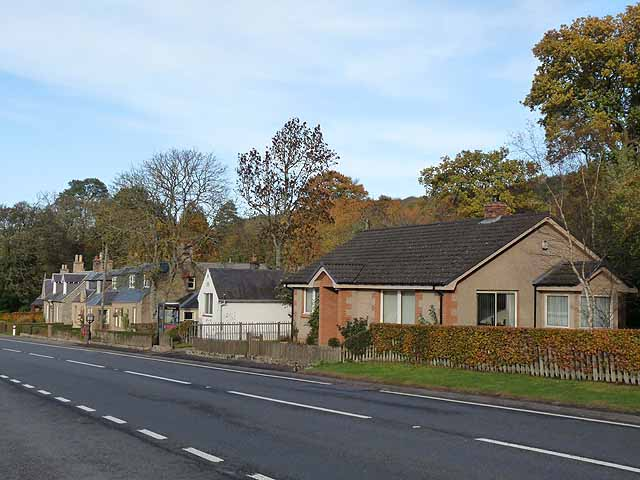

- Location within Scotland
- OS grid reference: NT 67937 13537
- Country: Scotland
- Sovereign state: United Kingdom

Camptown is a small settlement on the A68, in the Scottish Borders area of Scotland, 5m (8 km) south of Jedburgh, and the same distance south to Carter Bar. The village lies on the course of the Jed Water, and the remains of a peel tower are close by at Edgerston.

The village has a church and village hall at nearby Edgerston, a bus service to Jedburgh and Newcastle, a memorial cairn, and a telephone box. Schooling takes place in Jedburgh.

Other places nearby are Bairnkine, Bonchester Bridge, Crailing, Ferniehirst Castle, Hobkirk, the Jed Water, Mossburnford, and Oxnam.

== Influence ==
Scottish settlers named Camptown, Pennsylvania, after the Borders settlement, which in turn was the inspiration for the minstrel song Camptown Races by Stephen Foster. The village roadsign has appeared on postcards for comedic effect.

== See also ==
- List of places in the Scottish Borders
- List of places in Scotland
