= Nick Watt =

Nick Watt may refer to:

- Nick Watt (CNN reporter)
- Nicholas Watt, British journalist
