= Jedburgh =

Town in Scottish Borders, UK

Coordinates: 55.477°N 2.546°W

Jedburgh: Scottish Gaelic: Deadard; Scots: Jeddart, Jethart
- Town
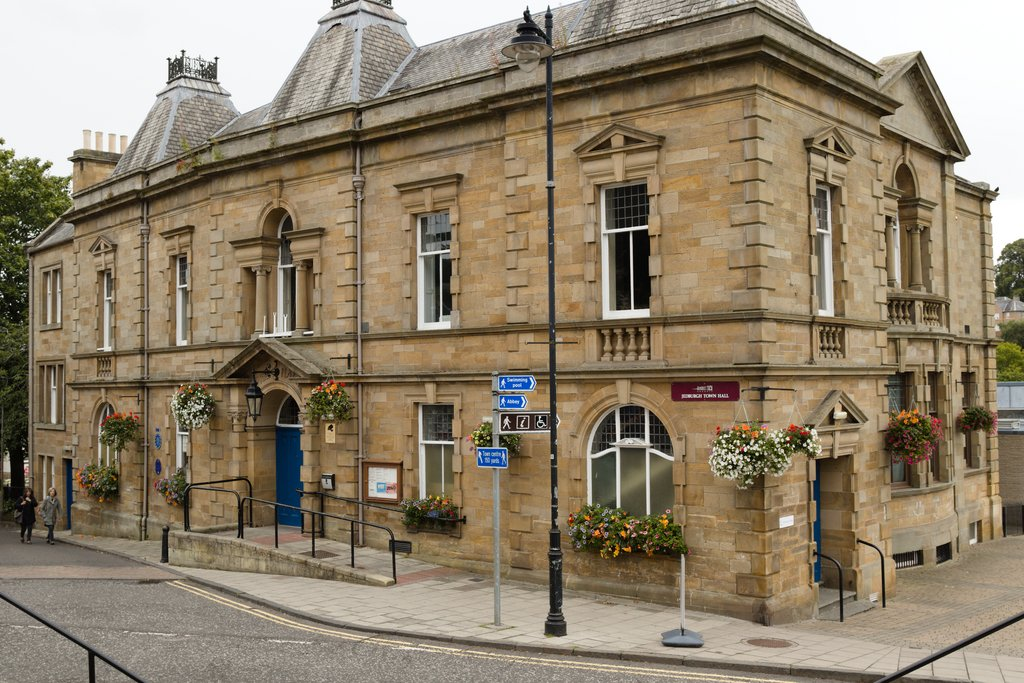
- Jedburgh Town Hall

- Location within the Scottish Borders
- Area: 1.74 km^{2} (0.67 sq mi)
- Population: 4,129 (2022)
  - Density: 2,373/km^{2} (6,150/sq mi)
- OS grid reference: NT649205
  - Edinburgh: 41 mi (66 km) NW
- Civil parish: Jedburgh
- Community council: Jedburgh
- Council area: Scottish Borders
- Lieutenancy area: Roxburgh, Ettrick and Lauderdale
- Country: Scotland
- Sovereign state: United Kingdom
- Post town: JEDBURGH
- Postcode district: TD8
- Dialling code: 01835
- Police: Scotland
- Fire: Scottish
- Ambulance: Scottish
- UK Parliament: Berwickshire, Roxburgh and Selkirk
- Scottish Parliament: Ettrick, Roxburgh and Berwickshire
- Website: www.jedburgh.org.uk

Jedburgh (/ˈdʒɛdbərə/ JED-bər-ə; Scottish Gaelic: Deadard; Scots: Jeddart or Jethart) is a market town and former royal burgh in the Scottish Borders, Scotland. It was the traditional county town of the historic county of Roxburghshire, and is approximately 41 miles (66 km) south west of Edinburgh, 74 miles (119 km) southeast of Glasgow, and 76 miles (122 km) southeast of Falkirk. It had a population of 4,129 in 2022.

== History ==
Jedburgh began as Jedworð, the "worth" or enclosed settlement on the Jed. Later the more familiar word "burgh" was substituted for this, though the original name survives as Jeddart/Jethart.

Bishop Ecgred of Lindisfarne founded a church at Jedburgh in the 9th century, and King David I of Scotland made it a priory between 1118 and 1138, housing Augustinian monks from Beauvais in France. The abbey was founded in 1147, but border wars with England in the 16th century left it a ruin.

The deeply religious Scottish king Malcolm IV died at Jedburgh in 1165, aged 24. His death is thought to have been caused by Paget's disease of bone.

David I built a castle at Jedburgh, and in 1174 it was one of five fortresses ceded to England. It was an occasional royal residence for the Scots. It was demolished in 1409.

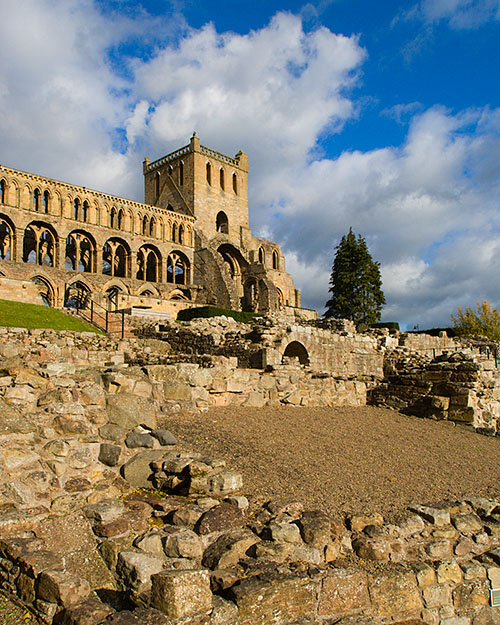
Jedburgh Abbey

In 1258, Jedburgh was a focus of royal attention, with negotiations between Scotland's Alexander III and England's Henry III over the succession to the Scottish throne, leaving the Comyn faction dominant. Alexander III was married to Yolande in the abbey in 1285.

In 1307, James Douglas, fighting for King Robert Bruce, took Jedburgh from the English with little effort.

Its proximity to England made it subject to raids and skirmishes by both Scottish and English forces but its strategic position also brought the town valuable trade. At various times and at various locations the town supported a horse market, a cattle market, a corn market and a butcher market. Farm workers and servants also attended hiring fairs seeking employment.

Jedburgh was burnt in September 1523 by an English force commanded by William Bulmer and Thomas Tempest. The Earl of Surrey reported the town had more houses than Berwick-upon-Tweed and six good towers. The horses stampeded from the English camp, some into the burning town. Such was the panic, Lord Dacre's men said that the Devil was seen amongst them. During the war with England now known as the "Rough Wooing", the Scots and their French allies made plans to fortify Jedburgh in 1549, with the advice of Camillo Marini, an Italian military engineer.

Mary, Queen of Scots, stayed at a certain house in the town in 1566 and that house is now a museum – Mary Queen of Scots House. Mary fell ill, and on 25 October 1566, the Privy council issued a "Proclamation to keep good rule at Jedburgh" during the time of her recuperation. No one should pursue their private quarrel and arm themselves, on pain of death for treason.

The title "Lord of Jedburgh Forest" was granted to George Douglas, 1st Earl of Angus on his marriage to the Princess Mary, daughter of Robert III in 1397. The titles of Archibald Douglas, 1st Duke of Douglas included "Viscount Jedburgh Forest", but he died without an heir in 1761.

On 6 November 1745, the Jacobite army led by Prince Charles Edward Stuart passed through the town on its way to England. The Castle Prison opened in 1823.

In 1787, the geologist James Hutton noted what is now known as the Hutton Unconformity at Inchbonny, near Jedburgh. Layers of sedimentary rock which are tilted almost vertically are covered by newer horizontal layers of red sandstone. This was one of the findings that led him to develop his concept of an immensely long geologic time scale with "no vestige of a beginning, no prospect of an end."

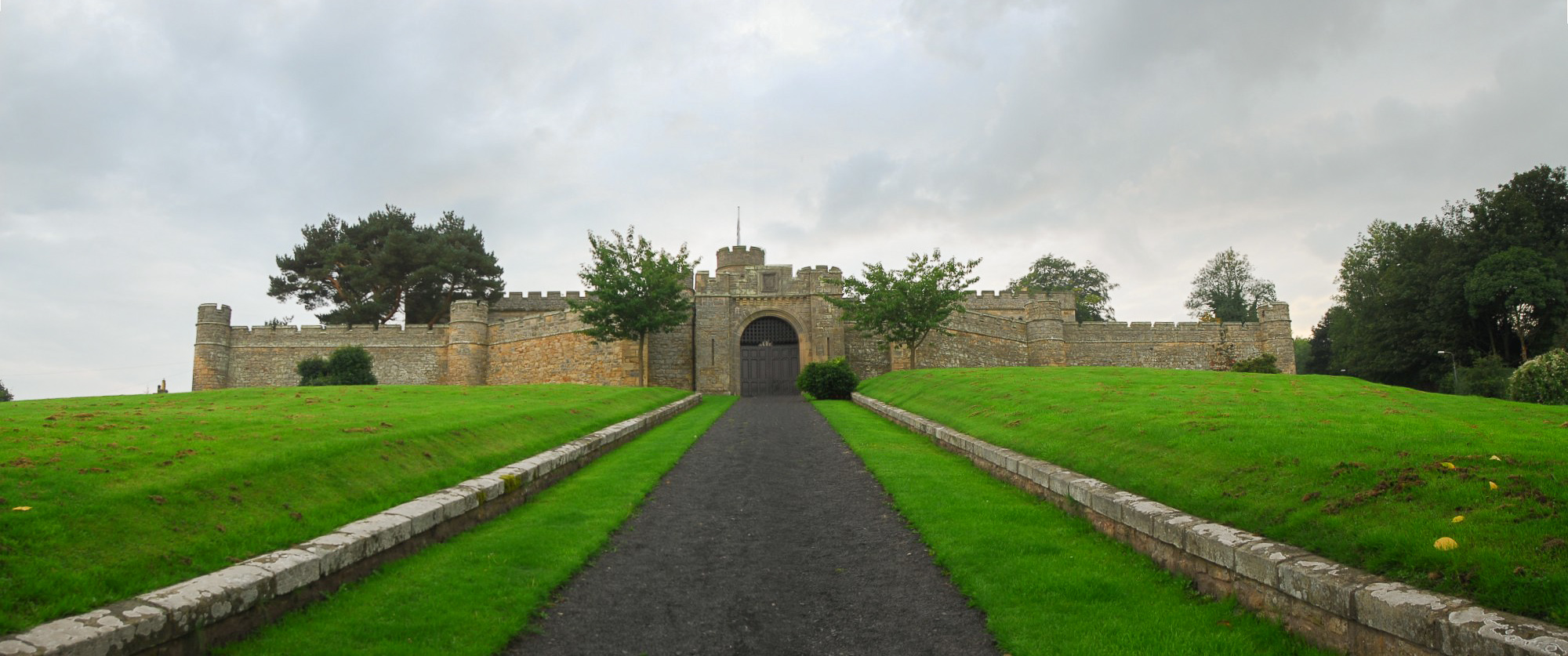
Jedburgh Castle

The Scots name for the town is part of the expression "Jeddart justice" or "Jethart Justice", in which a man was hanged first, and tried afterwards.

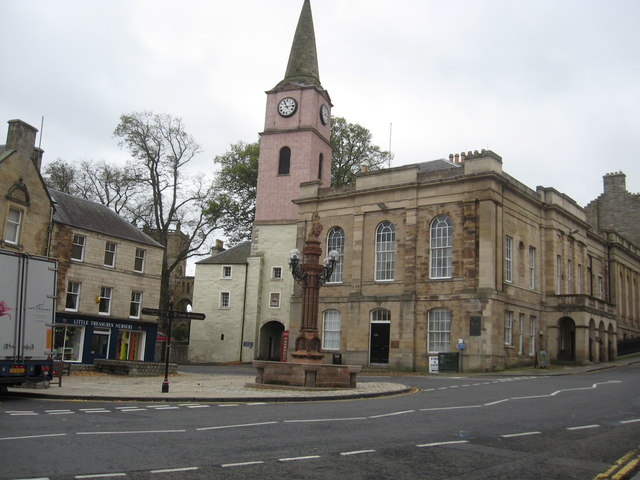
County Buildings, Castlegate, Jedburgh

Jedburgh became the county town of Roxburghshire after the original county town of Roxburgh was abandoned following the destruction of Roxburgh Castle in 1460 during the Anglo-Scottish Wars. In 1812, County Buildings was built at the junction of Market Place and Castlegate in Jedburgh, serving as both a sheriff court and meeting place for the Commissioners of Supply. Roxburghshire County Council was created in 1890 and continued to meet at the County Buildings until 1930 when it moved its meetings to County Offices at Newtown St Boswells.

The town's name was used for Operation Jedburgh, a clandestine operation by allied soldiers in occupied Europe during the Second World War.

== Geography ==
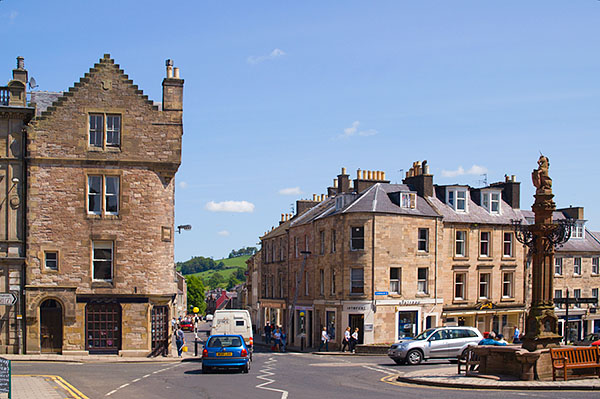
Mercat Cross from Castlegate

Jedburgh lies on the Jed Water, a tributary of the River Teviot. It is 10 miles (16 km) from the border with England, and is dominated by the substantial ruins of Jedburgh Abbey. Other notable buildings in the town include Queen Mary's House, Jedburgh Castle Jail, now a museum, and the Jedburgh Library.

Other places nearby are Ancrum, Bairnkine, Bonjedward, Camptown, Crailing, Edgerston, Ferniehirst Castle, Nisbet and Oxnam.

== Notable people ==
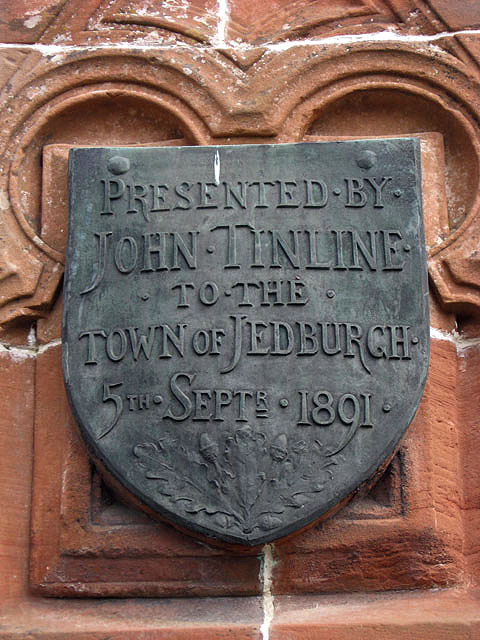
Plaque on the entrance to Allerley Well Park gifted by John Tinline

Several notable people were born in the town, including Rev Dr Thomas Somerville's niece, Mary Somerville, in 1780 (the eminent scientist and writer, after whom Somerville College, Oxford is named, and who appeared on the Royal Bank of Scotland £10 note from 2017).

James Thomson (1700–1748) who wrote "Rule Britannia", was born in Ednam, a village only twelve miles away, but he was educated in Jedburgh. David Brewster, physicist, mathematician, scientist, writer and inventor of the kaleidoscope, was born in Jedburgh in 1781. The popular preacher Rev. Robert Aitken (1800–1873) was born in Crailing near Jedburgh. General Sir Bindon Blood was born nearby in 1842. Alexander Jeffrey (F.S.A. Scot.) was a solicitor in the town and was also the county historian: he lived in Jedburgh until his death in 1874. The author and broadcaster Lavinia Derwent was born in a farmhouse a few miles outside Jedburgh in 1909. The Tinline brothers emigrated from Jedburgh in the late 1830s. George Tinline made a career in banking in Australia. John Tinline went to New Zealand and made his wealth in farming. John returned to Jedburgh later in life and gifted Allerley Well Park to his hometown.

The town's well known rugby players are the scrum-halves, Roy Laidlaw, his nephew, Scotland rugby team captain Greig Laidlaw and Gary Armstrong. Douglas Young fought at Heavyweight at the 1984 Summer Olympics.

Emmy Award-winning journalist Nick Watt is from Jedburgh and hosted a short film about the town for the Travel Channel.

== The town today ==
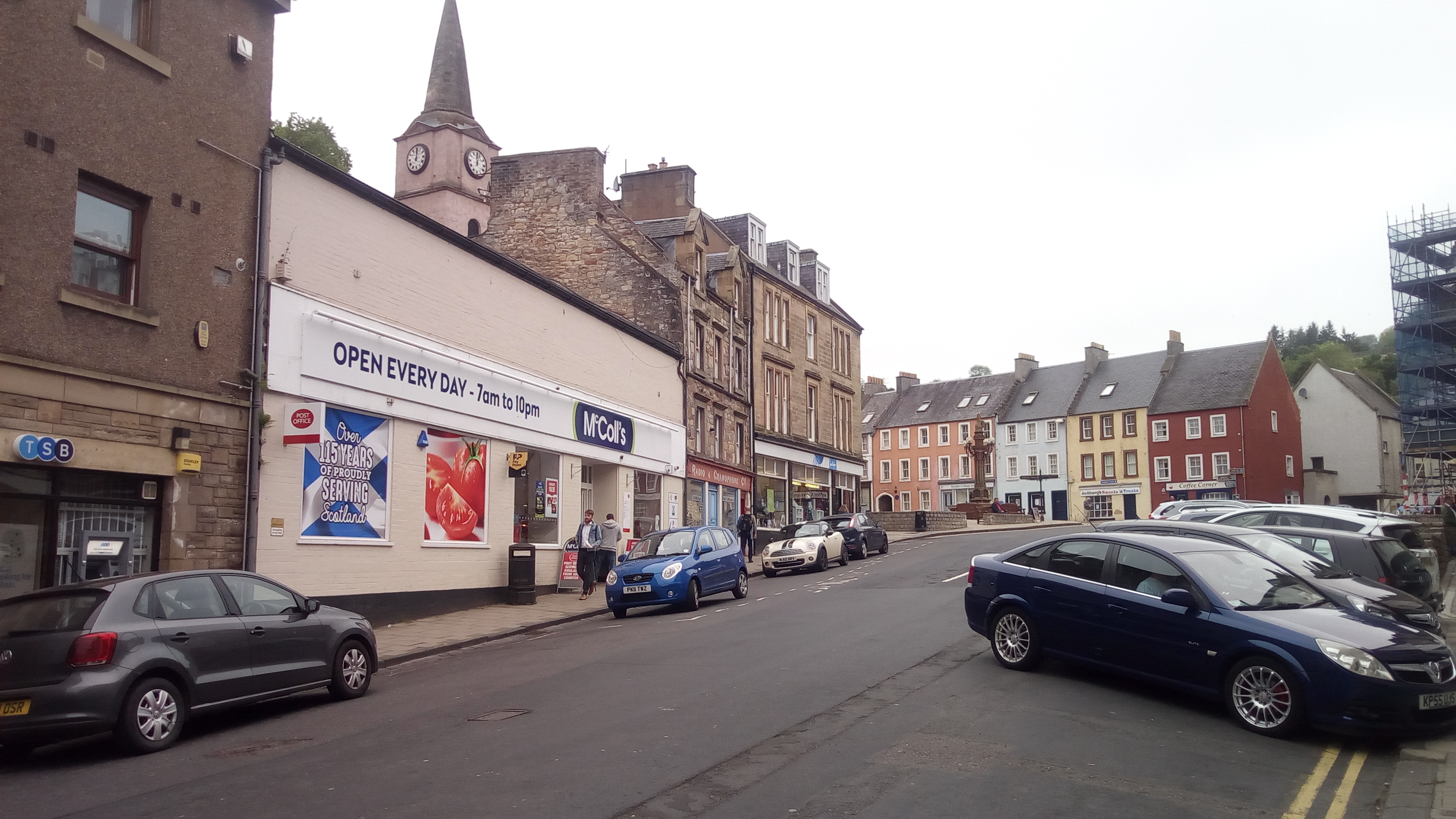
The Canongate in 2018.

The abbey is maintained by Historic Environment Scotland (HES) and open to the public (there is an entry fee). Finds from excavations are displayed on site in the visitor centre attached to the Abbey ruins. The shell of the abbey, though much damaged over the years, is still largely complete.

Traditional festivals and performers include the annual Callant's Festival, and Jedburgh Pipe Band and Jedforest Instrumental Band. Local delicacies include Jethart Snails (boiled sweets in the shape of a snail, said to originate from a recipe given to a local baker by a French prisoner, during the Napoleonic Wars) and Jethart pears. The fertile soil of Jedburgh makes it good for growing pear trees, and the pear trade was a thriving industry in Jedburgh for centuries.

An annual event is the 'Ba' Game' in Jedburgh.

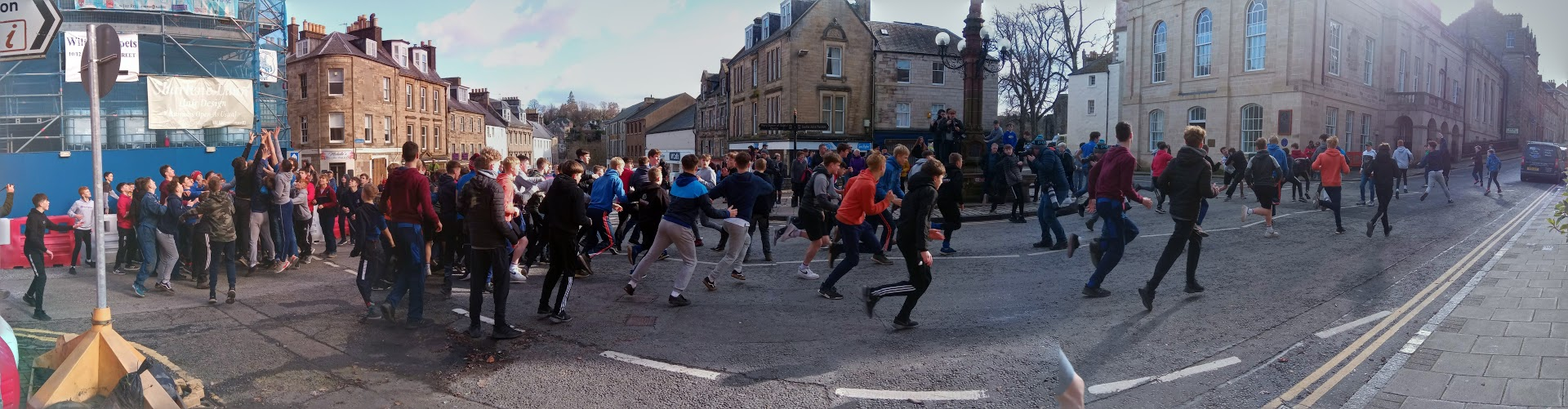
Ba' game, Jedburgh, February 2020

The Canongate Brig dates from the 16th century. The nearby Capon Oak Tree is recognised to be of national interest and the 19th-century Jedburgh Castle Jail and Newgate, with its spire, are among the town's notable buildings.

Schooling currently takes place at Jedburgh Intergenerational Community Campus, which opened in early 2020.

== Transport ==
Although Jedburgh no longer has any rail access, it is well located on the road network. The A68 provides direct access to Edinburgh (48 miles, 77 km) and Newcastle-upon-Tyne (58 miles, 93 km). Carlisle is 57 miles (92 km) away and Hawick, Kelso, Selkirk and Galashiels are all within 20 miles (30 km).

Jedburgh is known to motorists from the Edinburgh and Newcastle-upon-Tyne areas as Jedburgh is signposted as a primary destination on the A68.

Bus services to Jedburgh are provided by Borders Buses. Until July 2013, they were mostly run by local operator Munro's of Jedburgh.

== Sport ==
The town is home to a Rugby Club, Jed-Forest which was founded in 1885. Under-18 "Semi Junior" rugby is played by Jed Thistle at Lothian Park.

Football is represented by Jed Legion FC which currently plays in 'A' League of the Border Amateur League. Ancrum AFC play in the village of Ancrum just to the north at Bridgend Park and are in the Border Amateur 'B' League. A 1930s club, punningly named Jed Arts, won the East of Scotland League and the Border Cup in 1936–37.

Jedburgh has a golf club dating from 1892; the course has 18 holes.

== Twin town ==
Jedburgh is twinned with:

- Malestroit, Morbihan, France

== See also ==
- Jed-Forest Rugby Football Club
- Jedburgh (Parliament of Scotland constituency)
- List of places in the Scottish Borders
- List of places in Scotland
