= Clan Rutherford =

Lowland Scottish clan

- Motto: Nec sorte, nec fato (Neither by chance nor fate)

Profile
- Region: Scottish Borders
- District: Jedburgh
- Clan Rutherford no longer has a chief, and is an armigerous clan
- Historic seat: Rutherford Castle; Hunthill Castle; Eggerston Castle
Clan branches
Rutherford of Rutherford (historic chiefs)
Rutherford of Chatto and Hunthill (senior cadets)
Rutherfurd of Edgerston

Clan Rutherford or Rutherfurd/Rutherfurd is a Lowland Scottish clan of the Scottish Borders. The clan is officially recognized by the Lord Lyon King of Arms; however, as it does not currently have a clan chief that is recognized by the Lord Lyon King of Arms, it is considered an armigerous clan.

== History ==
=== Origins of the clan ===
==== Traditional origins ====
The lands of Rutherford are near to Maxton, Roxburghshire. There are two traditional origins of the clan. The first states that a man who was named Ruther guided an ancient king of Scots over a ford in the River Tweed which gave the king a victory over the Northumbrians. Ruther was rewarded with a grant of land and was thereafter named after the "ford" which had brought him good fortune. The other tradition states that an English army foolishly abandoned a strong position on the heights above the River Tweed, attacking a Scottish force on the opposite side. The English, attempting to force a crossing, were soundly defeated, and the Scots named the place Rue the Ford in commemoration. Whether this story was true or not, the English certainly came to rue the Rutherfords, who were fierce in their defence of their lands and eager to plunder the rich pickings of the Northumbrians.

==== Recorded origins ====
In around 1140 Robertus Dominus de Rodyrforde, witnessed a charter by David I of Scotland. Between 1161 and 1272, Nichol de Rutherford is also mentioned in several charters. In 1390 Sir Richard Rutherford witnessed a charter in favour of William, steward of Minto, Scottish Borders. Sir Richard Rutherford was also a favourite of Robert III of Scotland. In 1398 he was an ambassador to England and his sons were wardens of the Marches. A younger son of Richard obtained the lands of Chatto and Hunthill. The main line failed, and the Ruthford lands passed to the Tranquair family.

=== 16th century and clan conflicts ===
The Rutherford/Rutherfurd name continued to be feared in the Scottish Borders. Thomas Rutherfurd the Black Laird of Edgerston was famous for his daring attacks against the English. The most notable of his exploits was the Battle of the Red Swire which took place in July 1575. The battle came about when both the English and Scottish wardens of the Marches agreed to meet to hear their mutual grievances and to give redress for complaints. The Scots demanded that a notorious English brigand named Farnstein surrender. However the English warden, Sir John Forster, claimed that Farnstein could not be found. The Scottish warden, Sir John Carmichael, doubted this claim. The English warden then insulted Carmichael's family and the English bowmen discharged a flight of arrows at the Scots. The Scots were taken by surprise, driven back and Carmichael was captured. However the Clan Rutherford soon arrived on the scene, putting the English to flight, freeing Carmichael and instead taking prisoner the English warden and several of his lieutenants.

=== 17th century and civil war ===
The Rutherford Lairds of Edgerston distinguished themselves fighting for their king, Charles I of Scotland during the Civil War. Rutherford, at his own expense, raised a troop of horse and fought in England until 1646 when the king surrendered. He took up the royalist cause again but was severely wounded and his whole troop was wiped out at the Battle of Dunbar (1650). Lieutenant General Andrew Rutherford of the Rutherford of Chatto and Hunthill branch of the clan was made Lord Rutherford in the peerage in 1661. In 1663 he was appointed Governor of Tangier in Morocco, however he was killed in battle with Moroccan forces in 1664. He had been advanced to the earldom of Teviot but as he died without issue this title became extinct although the Lord Rutherford title went to a cousin.

=== Modern history ===
The Lord Rutherford title is also now extinct. From 1839 to 1851 Andrew Rutherford was MP for Leith. He had also held the office of Lord Advocate and had been elevated to the Bench with the judicial title of Lord Rutherford. Ernest Rutherford discovered the alpha particle and also developed the nuclear theory of atomic structure. He laid the groundwork for nuclear physics in the twentieth century. In 1914, he was knighted and in 1925 he was appointed to the Order of Merit.

Side note: the Rutherford family was engaged in a feud with Stuyvesant family when they both resided in Hackettstown, New Jersey. A notable event was of a son and daughter from the opposing families falling in love and marrying, a Romeo and Juliet situation, but without the bloodshed. The families built a church for the marriage, now located at 40 Puffer Road, Hackettstown, New Jersey. This collaborative effort is now seemingly abandoned, but more research is needed to certify this status.

Present day, the Stuyvesant mansion has been burned and is largely cleared, with its grounds encompassed in the western side Allamuchy State Park. The Rutherford house has been transformed into part of Mountain Villa School, located at 1686 CR-517, Allamuchy, New Jersey.

== Clan Castles ==
Castles that have belonged to the Clan Rutherford have included amongst others:

- Rutherford Castle, in Rutherford, was held by the Rutherford family from at least the middle of the twelfth century, although the site of the castle has not been definitively identified.
- Hunthill Castle, a mile south-east of Jedburgh in the Scottish Borders, was a strong tower that has been replaced by a nineteenth-century house. It was originally owned by the Glendinnings but passed to the Rutherfords in the fifteenth century and they built the tower.
- Edgerston Castle, six miles south east of Jedburgh, was held by the Rutherfurds but was seized by "assured" Scots for the English in 1544. Although the Rutherfords were amongst the clans who routed the English at the Battle of Ancrum Moor in the following year.In 1695 Thomas Rutherfurd (c.1650-1720) built the center part of the present house. It is unclear whether this incorporated or completely replaced the existing tower (c. 1600); however, the initials of Thomas Rutherfurd and his wife Susanna Riddell are said to be carved into one of the dormer windows.

John Rutherfurd (1748–1834) of Edgerston was a great benefactor to Edgerston. In 1793 he built on the two wings with their Venetian windows and the semi-circular tower at the south side of the house. In a letter written by his uncle, Baron Robert Rutherfurd to Walter Rutherfurd, " Fairnington, Oct 28, 1788, Dear Walter, I want to send you a copy of the plan of the improvements that our nephew is making at Edgerston. He is putting on two wings at a cost of 3,000 and when it is completed it will be one of the finest seats in the Shire." In a letter between the same uncles, "Fairnington, Nov 26, 1792. Edgerston House by being repaired with additions is now one of the handsomest and most commodious of any in this county."

The final addition to Edgerston was the Tower built by William Oliver-Rutherfurd(1781-1879) in 1840. This tower is a fully equipped house.

On the hill above Edgerston House can be seen the remains of a peel tower which was used by the Rutherfurds for defense against the Kerrs and other families that the Rutherfurds were feuding with, and as defense against the English.

- Chatto, near Morebattle in the Scottish Borders is the site of a castle that was held by the Rutherfurds of Chatto from the fourteenth or early fifteenth century.
