= Jed Arts F.C. =

Association football club in Scotland

Jed Arts
- Full name: Jed Arts Association Football Club
- Nickname(s): Jed, the Arts
- Founded: 1930
- Dissolved: 1937
- Ground: Lothian Park, Bankend
- President: Provost Jack
Home colours

Jed Arts A.F.C. was an association football club from Jedburgh, Scottish Borders.

== History ==
The club was formed on 3 July 1930 as a side from the rayon factory, and its name was chosen as matching the pronunciation of the club's home town. The media occasionally retconned the name as standing for Jedburgh Artisans but the club's official name - and how it was most often referred to - was Jed Arts.

Jed Arts joined the East of Scotland League in 1930–31, replacing Hawick United in October 1930 after United's withdrawal, and also played in the Border Cup and King Cup from that season, plus the East of Scotland Shield from 1933 to 1934. The club's greatest successes came in 1936–37, when it won both the East of Scotland League (losing only 1 game, Walkingshaw scoring 30 of the club's 62 goals) and the Border Cup (beating Peebles Rovers 4–0 in the final), and reaching the final of the King Cup. This was in part due to bringing in "imported" players from around the region, rather than relying on home-town players.

Buoyed by this success, and now with a private ground, the club applied to join the Scottish Football Association before the 1937–38 season, but was rejected on the basis that the Bankend facilities were not up to scratch. The refusal was devastating; the expense required for its success the previous season was crippling, and, without SFA membership, the club had no access to a potentially lucrative income stream. The previous season, each home game had £10-£12 in expenses but only generated £4-£5 through the gates. The result was that, just before Christmas 1937, the Arts "shut up shop".

=== Player death ===
On 24 December 1932, the Arts played Chirnside United at Hawick; 20-year-old goalkeeper Robert Halliday was making his first appearance of the season. In the last seconds of the match, he suffered a kick to his kidneys in diving at the feet of an opponent, and was taken to hospital. Despite an operation on Christmas Day in the Edinburgh Royal Infirmary, he died later that evening.

== Colours ==
The club wore blue and white stripes, with white shorts and black socks.

== Ground ==
The club originally played at Lothian Park. The ground was a public park, which precluded membership of the Scottish Football Association, and was subject to restrictions on use, which included requiring Mr Innes of the borough survey department to approve the pitch before each match; this cost the club every time a match was postponed after it had put its paraphernalia in place. In 1935 the club obtained its own private ground at Bankend Farm, opposite to Jedburgh railway station, thanks to the generosity of the Marquis of Lothian.

== Notable players ==
The 1936–37 side included:

- Robert King, defender, formerly of Heart of Midlothian, who captained the side in its 1936–37 season
- Paddy Burke, left-half, formerly of Hibernian
- Dave Sherlaw, centre-half, formerly of Charlton Athletic
