= Bairnkine =

Village in Scottish Borders, Scotland

Coordinates: 55.43530°N 2.54916°W

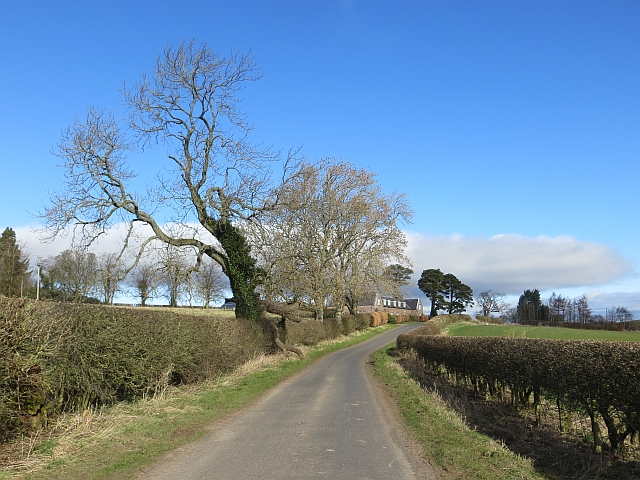
- Bairnkine

- Location within the Scottish Borders
- OS grid reference: NT653158
- Council area: Scottish Borders
- Country: Scotland
- Sovereign state: United Kingdom
- Police: Scotland
- Fire: Scottish
- Ambulance: Scottish
- UK Parliament: Berwickshire, Roxburgh and Selkirk
- Scottish Parliament: Ettrick, Roxburgh and Berwickshire

Bairnkine is a hamlet on the Jed Water in the Scottish Borders area of Scotland, on the A68, south of Jedburgh.

Other places nearby include Abbotrule, Bedrule, Camptown, Chesters, Langlee, Mervinslaw and Oxnam.

== See also ==
- List of places in the Scottish Borders
- List of places in Scotland
