= Uphall F.C. (1892) =

Former association football club in Scotland

Uphall
- Full name: Uphall Football Club
- Founded: 1892
- Dissolved: 1896
- Ground: Crossgreen Park
- Hon. Secretary: J. H. Anthony Jr.
- Match Secretary: James S. Brown
Home colours

Uphall Football Club was a football club from Uphall in West Lothian.

== History ==
The club was formed on 12 September 1892 at a meeting in the Uphall Inn and almost immediately accepted into the East of Scotland Football Association. This allowed the club to enter the three main tournaments for clubs in the area - the East of Scotland Shield, the King Cup, and the Linlithgowshire Cup. Indeed, the first round of the Linlithgowshire had already taken place, and the club was allowed to enter the competition in the second round, to play the similarly late entrant Bathgate Athletic. Uphall's 5–3 win put the club into the semi-final, but it lost 3–2 at home to Broxburn, the winner coming in the last minute. Uphall lost in the first round of the Shield, but did get to the semi-final of the Consolation Cup; drawn to visit Bathgate Rovers, Uphall took a half-time lead with the conditions in its favour, but lost the match 4–1.

The club's ambition was shown by it joining the Scottish Football Association in 1893, and being one of the six clubs which met at the start of 1894 to form the East of Scotland League. However it lost in the first preliminary round of the Scottish Cup (5–2 at home to Polton Vale), in the first round of the Shield and Linlithgowshire Cups, and in the second round of the King. The club's only league season was unsuccessful, the League petered out before the fixtures were completed. Uphall had a 2–3 season.

1895–96 was Uphall's final season; apart from its initial season, it had never won more than 1 match in any knockout competition in any season. The club's only win in the Scottish Cup had been 5–0 at Kelso in the first preliminary round in 1894–95. The club was struck from the Scottish FA roll in August 1896.

== Colours ==
The club kit was maroon shirts and white knickers.

== Ground ==
The club played at Crossgreen Park, formerly known as Craigview Park, when it had been the home ground of predecessor junior club Uphall Bluebell.
