= Vale of Gala F.C. =

Former association football club in Scotland

Vale of Gala
- Full name: Vale of Gala F.C.
- Founded: 1889
- Dissolved: 1894
- Ground: Mossilee
- Hon. Secretary: J. Lyall
- Match Secretary: David Grant
Home colours

Vale of Gala F.C. was an association football club from Galashiels, Selkirkshire.

== History ==
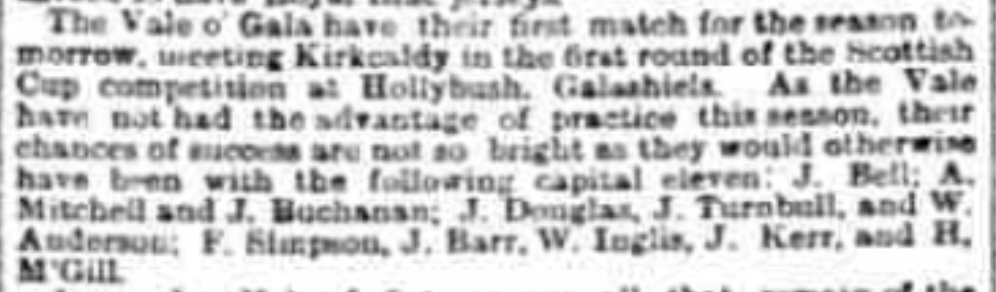
The Vale of Gala F.C. side for its 1892–93 Scottish Cup qualifying round tie with Kirkcaldy, Edinburgh Evening News, 2 September 1892

The club is first recorded in November 1889, losing 2–1 at home to Selkirk. Its first competitive football came in the first Border Cup in 1890–91, losing 4–2 at Kelso Athletic in the first round, and rage-quitting the association after the rejection of a protest against Kelso's "mixed colours".

Despite this, Vale of Gala stepped up to the Scottish Football Association in 1891, and entered the Scottish Cup, East of Scotland Shield, and King Cup as well as the Border in 1891–92. The Border counties were more partial to rugby football, so while the Vale was competitive against its local rivals, it was generally heavily beaten in other competitions.

1891–92 was its only entry in the King Cup (the club losing 10–5 at Hawick Rangers in the first round), 1892–93 its final entry in the Border, and 1893–94 its final entry in the Scottish Cup and East of Scotland Shield. Its only successful season came in the 1891–92 Border Cup, when wins over Selkirk and Kelso put it in the final, which it lost 1–0 against Duns at Kelso's Springwood Park, having spent most of the match playing with ten men after an eye injury to a forward.

Its three attempts at the Scottish Cup all ended in defeats in the first qualifying round. In 1891–92, the club lost 4–3 to Selkirk at Mossilee, the Vale having taken the lead three times in the match. In 1892–93, it was beaten 10–0 at home by Kirkcaldy, and in 1893–94 lost 8–0 at Selkirk. That seems to be the club's last match, although the name at least was revived - albeit briefly - in 1897. The club was struck from the Scottish FA roll in August 1894.

== Colours ==
The club wore royal blue and white "striped" (in the context, hooped) jerseys and white knickers.

== Ground ==
The club's earliest home matches were on the Galashiels Public Park, By the end of the season it had obtained a tenancy of Mossilee.

For the 1892–93 season, the club moved to Hollybush, which may have been foisted on the club by losing Mossilee; it was noted that the club had been unable to practise over the summer, which contributed to the club's double-figure defeat to Kirkcaldy in its first match of the season.
