= Crailinghall =

Village in Scottish Borders, Scotland, UK

Coordinates: 55.4925°N 2.4784°W

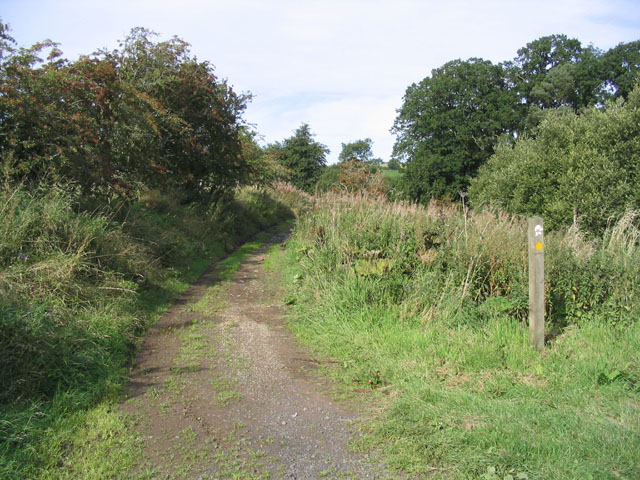
Dere Street at Crailinghall

Crailinghall is a village near Oxnam in the Scottish Borders area of Scotland, in the former Roxburghshire.

Crailinghall is on the route of the St. Cuthbert's Way and the Roman Heritage Way.

== See also ==
- List of places in the Scottish Borders
- List of places in Scotland

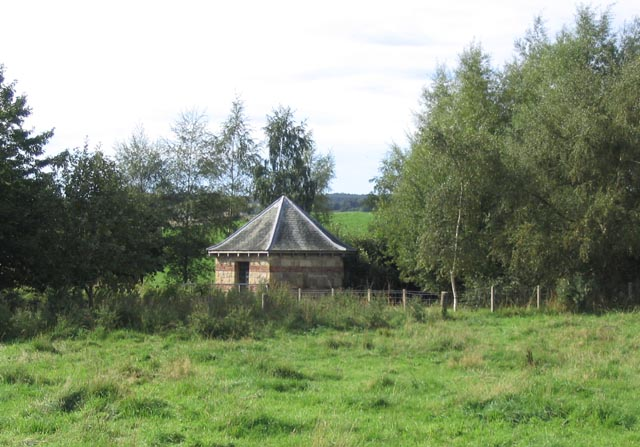
Folly at Crailinghall
