= Kelso F.C. =

Former association football club in Scotland

Kelso
- Full name: Kelso F.C.
- Founded: 1889
- Dissolved: 1914
- Ground: Springwood Park
- Secretary: A. M. Hynde
Home colours

Kelso Football Club was an association football club from the town of Kelso in Roxburghshire, active before the First World War.

== History ==
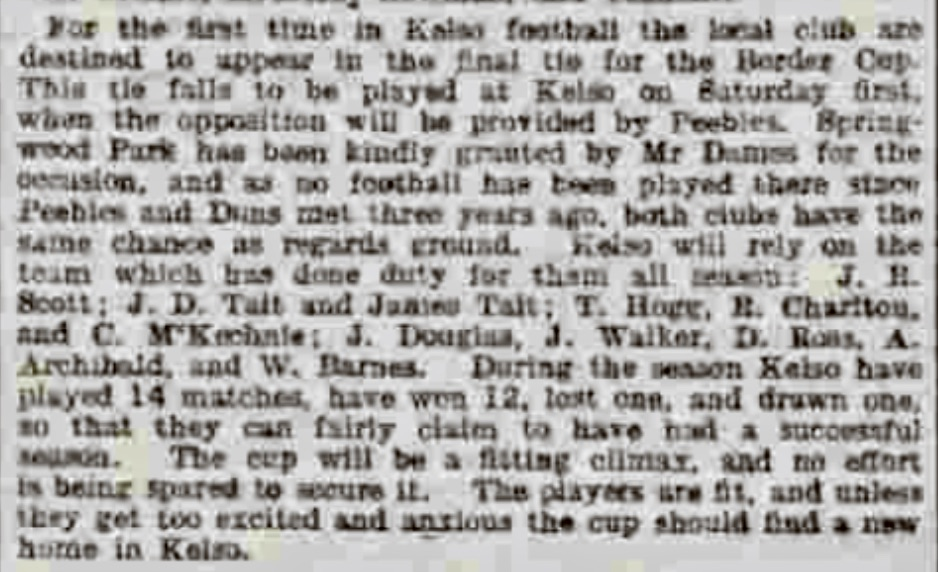
Kelso F.C.'s side for the 1897–98 Border Cup final, Edinburgh Evening News, 8 April 1898

The first reference to a form of football in the town was to the rugby football code in the 1870s. The earliest reference to association football being played in Kelso is of the Kelso Athletic club losing 3–0 at home to Swinton towards the end of 1889.

In 1890, Kelso Rugby Club formed an association side, suspected of being "for the purpose of spiting the Athletic". The two clubs played a less-than-friendly friendly on Springwood Park at the end of 1890, which ended 0–0. Kelso F.C. held a vote at the end of the season as to whether to continue with association, and by a majority of 8 resolved to do so.

Kelso Athletic was the first club from the town to play competitive football at county level, by playing two ties in the 1890–91 Border Cup (surviving a protest from Vale of Gala for playing in "mixed colours"). However, from 1891 the Athletic seems to have been absorbed by the rugby club, with at least three of the Athletic players (including captain Faulds) in the Kelso Association Club's side, and there being no further record of the Athletic, Kelso taking over the role of being the town's representative at county level.

Kelso however lost its first ties in the Border Cup every season from 1891–92 to 1896–97. Despite this lack of success, Kelso entered the Scottish Cup for the first time in the first preliminary round in 1894–95, losing 5–0 at home to Uphall. The following season, Kelso entered the East of Scotland Shield and King Cup for the first time, as well as the new Scottish Qualifying Cup. The club lost in the first round of the Shield and King Cup, and scratched from the Qualifying Cup. 1896–97 was slightly better, as it won one tie (beating Vale of Leithen in the Shield), but scratched again in the Qualifying Cup, and the following season another scratching in the Qualifying Cup effectively ensured the club's exclusion from senior football in future. Kelso also withdrew from the East of Scotland Association in 1897, citing transport difficulties.

The club therefore reverted to local football afterwards, and its first win in the Border Cup, in 1897–98 - 1–0 at Duns - put the club in the final. Despite home advantage, Kelso lost 4–3 to Peebles Rovers, throwing away a three-goal lead, and missing a penalty. Kelso reached two more finals; in 1900–01 it lost 3–1 to Vale of Leithen at Duns, and in 1913–14 lost to Gala Fairydean at Selkirk. It did not re-emerge after the First World War.

== Colours ==
The club wore black and white vertical stripes, first adopted in December 1891.

== Ground ==
The club's home as a senior club was Springwood Park, which had sometimes been used for association matches beforehand, although Shedden Park had also been used.
