= Canongate Bridge =

Bridge in the Scottish Borders, Scotland

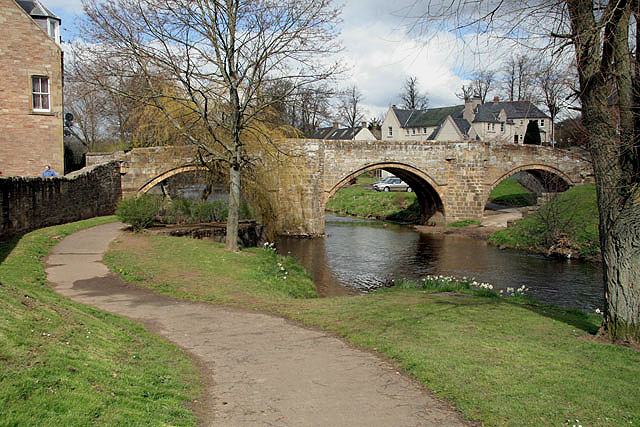
- View of the bridge looking downstream
- Coordinates: 55.477944°N 2.5511°W
- Carries: Pedestrian traffic
- Crosses: Jed Water
- Locale: Jedburgh

Characteristics
- Material: Sandstone
- Width: 3 m (9.8 ft)
- No. of spans: 3

Listed Building – Category A
- Official name: Canongate Bridge
- Designated: 15 March 1971
- Reference no.: LB35471

Location
- Interactive map of Canongate Bridge

The Canongate Bridge is a pedestrian bridge in the Scottish Borders town of Jedburgh. It was built as the town's main bridge over the Jed Water in the 16th century. Since 1971 it has been a category A listed building.

== Description ==
The Canongate Bridge is a 16th-century stone three-arch bridge that was the original main access over the Jed Water into the town of Jedburgh. The crossing, which is built of local cream-coloured sandstone, has a roadway up to 3 m (9.8 ft) wide with refuges for pedestrians. The bridge was said to be in desperate need of repair in 1677 and 1770; repairs took place in 1772.1770

The bridge, which is no longer open to road vehicles, is within the Jedburgh's conservation area and many of the surrounding buildings are listed. At one end is Duck Row and the Piper's House.

== Flooding ==
The Jed Water is liable to flood, so the river levels are monitored near the bridge. The depth is usually between 0.37 and 2.33 metres deep but it has been as deep as 3.5m which it reached in January 2016. In 2020 there was a problem when the flood defences near the bridge were breached by debris in one storm just before another storm hit. Luckily repairs were made and serious flooding was avoided.

== See also ==
- List of bridges in Scotland
