= Munro's of Jedburgh =

British bus company

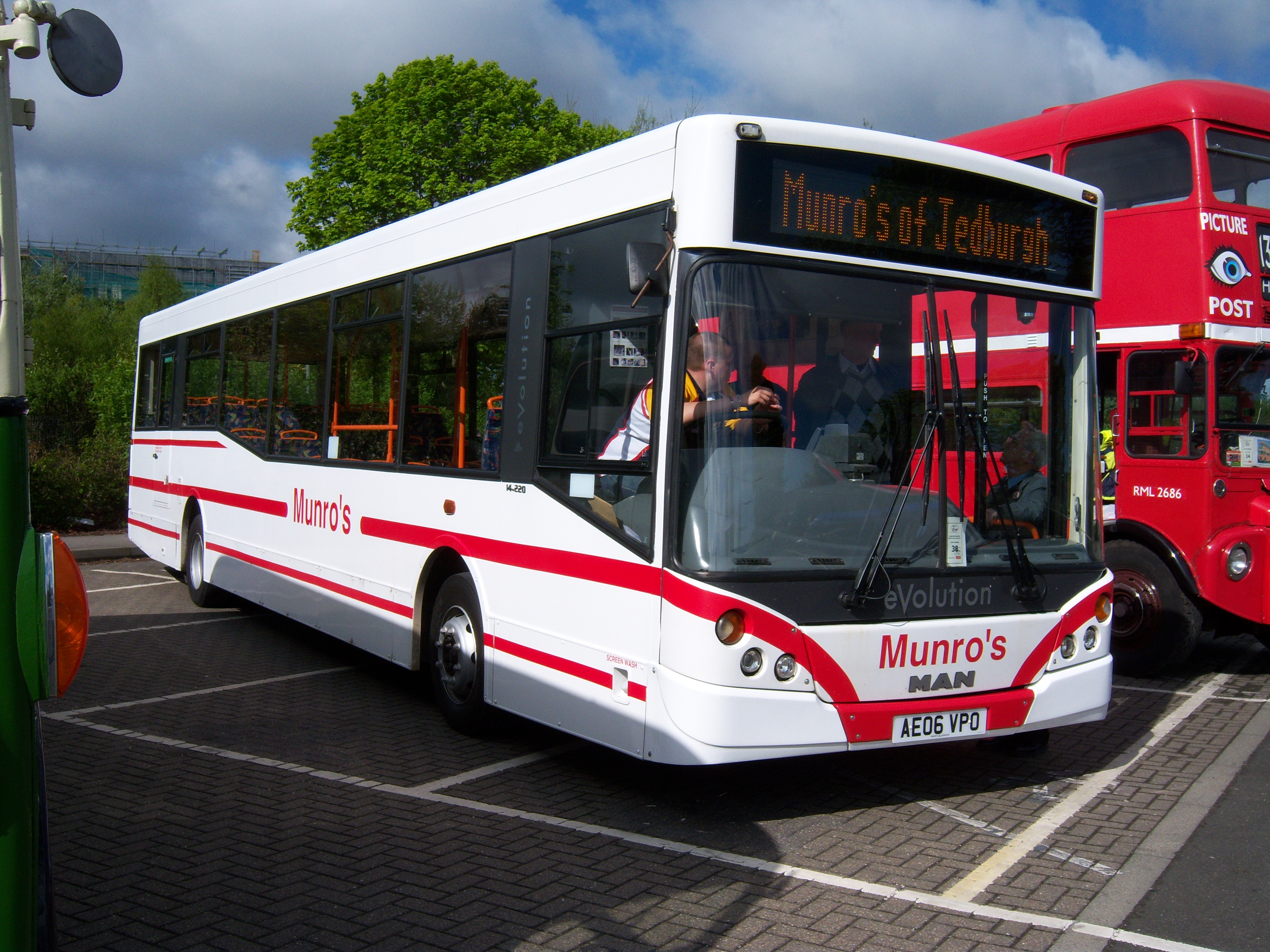
- Founded: 1960s; 64 years ago
- Ceased operation: July 2013; 11 years ago
- Headquarters: Jedburgh, Scottish Borders; Scotland
- Service area: City of Edinburgh; East Lothian; Midlothian; Northumberland; Scottish Borders; Tyne and Wear
- Service type: Bus and coach
- Website: munrosofjedburgh.co.uk

Munro's of Jedburgh was a bus company, which operated local and regional bus services in the City of Edinburgh, East Lothian, Midlothian and Scottish Borders, Scotland, as well as Northumberland and Tyne and Wear, England. The company was closed in July 2013, following a retendering exercise by Scottish Borders Council.

== History ==
The company was founded in the mid-1960s by Jimmy Munro, who expanded his hire car business to include coach operations. The company later began to operate works and schools contracts in Roxburghshire.

In 1992, the company began its first local route, the contracted Border Courier service, as a joint operation with Austin's of Earlston. Munro's also launched a service linking the Borders General Hospital with Lilliesleaf and Hawick, which ran three days a week.

Munro retired in 1998 and, as the family did not want to continue in the business, the company was put up for sale. In July 1998, the company, along with a small garage workshop, yard, and 8 vehicles, was bought by former First Group area managers Donald Cameron and Ewan Farish.

The new owners were keen to expand the business, and quickly won additional contracts with both schools and local rugby teams. In July 2000, the company took over routes 29 and 30 (now the 51 and 52, operated by Borders Buses), and routes 65, 66, 67, and 68 from First Scotland East. A further three contracts were won over the next two years.

August 2002 saw further expansion, with Munro's providing new town services, following the closure of First depots in Hawick and Kelso.

In 2006, the Scottish Borders Council and the Rural Bus Development Grant subsidised a number of service improvements, including more frequent services from Jedburgh and Kelso to Edinburgh (routes 51 and 52), and a new service from Galashiels to Berwick-upon-Tweed (route 67). Munro's won the contracts to operate both services, although the 67 was later lost to Perryman's (now Borders Buses).

Another contract win in 2006 saw Munro's launch a network of routes in and around the towns of Dalkeith and Musselburgh. These services used two Plaxton Primo single-decker vehicles, the only two of their type in Scotland at the time.

In June 2009 operation of contracted route 20, linking Kelso to Hawick, was lost to McEwans after five years. A number of journeys on routes 51 and 52, linking Jedburgh and Kelso to Edinburgh, were controversially axed in November 2009.

=== Demise and closure ===
In October 2010, the company was fined £3,000 by the Scottish Traffic Commissioner, as well as having the number of vehicles it was licensed to operate cut from 40 to 32.

In April 2011, the company's routes in Dalkeith and Musselburgh were withdrawn. The routes were subsequently taken over by First Scotland East.

In January 2013, the company's operating licence was revoked, following an inquiry into the loaning of vehicle operating discs to another operator, Edinburgh Group Travel, in October 2011. Services continued to operate as usual whilst the decision was appealed by the company. Although the appeal proved to be unsuccessful, the company applied for, and was granted, a new licence.

In June 2013, it was announced that the company had lost nine contract routes during a retendering process by Scottish Borders Council, including routes linking Kelso and Jedburgh with Edinburgh and Galashiels. The company subsequently ceased trading on 3 July 2013, with routes taken over by other operators on temporary contracts.
