= John Rutherfurd =

American politician

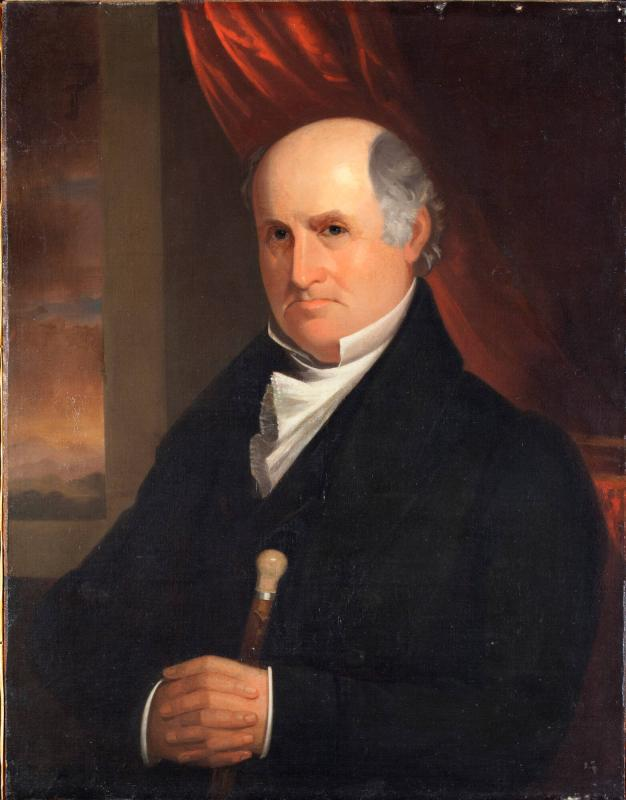
- A portrait of Rutherfurd by George Catlin, c. 1820

United States Senator from New Jersey
- In office March 4, 1791 – December 5, 1798
- Preceded by: Jonathan Elmer
- Succeeded by: Franklin Davenport

Member of the New Jersey General Assembly
- In office 1789–1790

Personal details
- Born: September 20, 1760 New York City, New York, British America
- Died: February 23, 1840 (aged 79) New Jersey, U.S.
- Party: Federalist
- Spouse: Helena Morris (m. 1782)
- Children: 8
- Parent(s): Walter Rutherfurd; Mary Alexander
- Relatives: Lewis Morris (father-in-law); Lewis Morris Rutherfurd (grandson); John Rutherfurd (uncle)

John Rutherfurd (September 20, 1760 – February 23, 1840) was an American politician and land surveyor. He represented New Jersey in the United States Senate from 1791 to 1798.

== Early life and education ==
Rutherfurd was born on September 20, 1760, in New York City to Walter Rutherfurd (1723–1804) and Catherine Alexander (1727–1801), daughter of James Alexander and Mary Spratt Provoost. His father Walter, a veteran of the British Army, was a hostage of the Patriots during the Revolutionary War while John was a teenager. Rutherfurd attended the College of New Jersey, which is now Princeton University, where he studied law.

His sister, Mary Rutherfurd, was married to Maj. Gen. Matthew Clarkson. His maternal uncle was William Alexander (1726–1783), also known as Lord Stirling. Rutherfurd was also related to Gilbert Elliot-Murray-Kynynmound, 4th Baronet (1751–1814), William Eden, 1st Baron Auckland (1745–1814), John Elliott (1732–1808), Governor of Newfoundland, Arthur St. Clair (1736–1818), a General and territorial Governor of Ohio. His paternal uncle was John Rutherfurd, an MP who was killed at Fort Ticonderoga during the Battle of Carillon, and was the father of John Rutherfurd, also an MP for Roxburghshire.

== Career ==
After graduating from the College of New Jersey, Rutherfurd practiced law in New York City for several years. In 1787, he moved to a farm near Green Township, New Jersey, in Sussex County, New Jersey. After a boundary for the new county was drawn in 1824, his former holdings straddled Sussex and Warren counties.

In 1788, he entered politics, serving in the New Jersey General Assembly until 1790. He was then elected as a Federalist to the United States Senate from New Jersey and served in the Senate from 1791 to 1798. Rutherfurd was the only senator to vote against the First Militia Act of 1792, and one of two senators to vote against the Eleventh Amendment to the United States Constitution.

After serving in the United States Senate, Rutherfurd then retired from politics, but continued to undertake several important projects during the rest of his life. He was one of the three Commissioners who laid out the plans for the Manhattan street grid north of 14th Street from 1807 to 1811. Around 1816 he investigated the building of a possible canal connecting the Delaware, Raritan and Hudson rivers. Finally, from 1827 to 1833, he helped settle New Jersey's boundaries with New York and Pennsylvania.

== Personal life ==
In 1782, he married Helena Magdalena Morris (1762–1840), daughter of Congressman Lewis Morris, and remained married to her until his death in 1840, with Helena dying shortly after him. Together, they had eight children, including:

- Mary Rutherfurd (1784–1868), who did not marry and served as the executor of her Rutherfurd's estate.
- Robert Walter Rutherfurd (1788–1852), a member of the New Jersey State Legislature, who married Sabina Elliott Morris (1789–1857), his first cousin.
- Helena Rutherfurd (1790–1873), who married Peter Gerard Stuyvesant (1778–1847), the 2x-great grandson of Peter Stuyvesant and one of the wealthiest New Yorkers in his lifetime.
- Louisa Morris Rutherfurd (1792–1857), who died unmarried.
- Anna Rutherfurd (1794–1852), who married Dr. John Watts (1786–1834), a son of Robert Watts (son of John Watts) and Mary (née Alexander) Watts (daughter of William Alexander, Lord Stirling).

In 1808, Rutherfurd moved with his family to a farm on the banks of the Passaic River near what is now Rutherford, New Jersey. He lived at this place for the rest of his life, naming it "Edgerston", and died there.

=== Descendants ===
Coat of Arms of John Rutherfurd

Rutherfurd's grandson through his son Robert, was Lewis Morris Rutherfurd (1816–1892), a pioneering astrophotographer who took the first telescopic photographs of the moon and sun, as well as many stars and planets.

=== Legacy ===
The borough of Rutherford, New Jersey, was named at least in part after John Rutherfurd, who had owned much of the land during his life. However, the spelling was changed due to the fame of President Rutherford B. Hayes who was President of the United States during the 1870s when the town was created.

U.S. Senate
Preceded by Jonathan Elmer	U.S. senator (Class 1) from New Jersey; 1791–1798; Served alongside: Philemon Dickinson, Frederick; Frelinghuysen, Richard Stockton	Succeeded by Franklin Davenport
Honorary titles
Preceded by Paine Wingate	Most senior living U.S. senator (Sitting or former); March 7, 1838 – February 23, 1840	Succeeded by Albert Gallatin
