= William Douglas, 14th of Cavers =

Scottish politician

William Douglas, 14th of Cavers (c. 1688 – January 1748) was a Scottish politician who sat in the House of Commons between 1715 and 1747.

Douglas was the eldest son of Archibald Douglas of Cavers and his wife Anna Scott, daughter of Francis Scott of Gorrenberry.

Douglas was returned at the 1715 British general election, as Member of Parliament (MP) for Roxburghshire on his father's interest. He voted with the Government in every recorded divisions, including that on Lord Cadogan on 4 June 1717. At the 1722 British general election he moved to Dumfries Burghs and was returned as MP on the Queensberry-Annandale interest. At the 1727 British general election, he left his seat at Dumfries in favour of his father and returned to Roxburghshire. He was appointed Keeper of the Register of Hornings in 1728. He voted against the Hessians in 1730 but was absent from other divisions. He did not stand in 1734 or 1741.

In 1741, Douglas succeeded his father and became hereditary Sheriff of Roxburgh. In 1742 he resigned as hereditary sheriff in favour of his brother Archibald in order to become Member of Parliament again. He was returned as MP for Roxburghshire at a by-election on 18 February 1742. He was a member of a group of Scotch MP's who were known as the Duke of Argyll's gang. He voted with the Opposition in all three divisions on the Hanoverians. He did not stand at the 1747 British general election.

Douglas died unmarried in 1748. His brother Archibald became 15th Laird of Cavers.

Parliament of Great Britain
Preceded by Sir Gilbert Eliott, 3rd Bt	Member of Parliament for Roxburghshire; 1715–1722	Succeeded by Sir Gilbert Elliot, 2nd Bt
Preceded by Alexander Fergusson	Member of Parliament for Dumfries Burghs; 1722–1727	Succeeded by Archibald Douglas
Preceded by Sir Gilbert Eliott, 3rd Bt	Member of Parliament for Roxburghshire; 1727–1734	Succeeded by John Rutherfurd
Preceded by John Rutherfurd	Member of Parliament for Roxburghshire; 1742–1747	Succeeded by Walter Scott
