= Border Amateur Football League =

- Founded: 1936
- Country: Scotland
- Confederation: UEFA
- Divisions: 2
- Number of clubs: 25
- Current champions: A Division Langlee Amateurs; B Division Gala Fairydean Rovers Amateurs
- Website: Official website

The Border Amateur Football League is a football league for amateur clubs in the Scottish Borders.

The league was founded in 1936 and is affiliated to the Scottish Amateur Football Association. It currently features 25 teams in two divisions, named the A and B. Teams from both divisions compete for the Waddell Cup and Colin Campbell Cup and (providing they enter) the South Cup and Scottish Amateur Cup. The Border Cup is competed for by A Division clubs and Beveridge Cup by clubs from the B Division. The Forsyth Cup is a consolation tournament for teams knocked out in the preliminary and first round of the Waddell Cup.

== 2025-2026 League Members ==
=== A Division ===
- Chirnside United
- Duns Amateurs
- Earlston Rhymers
- Eyemouth Utd Amateurs
- Greenlaw
- Hawick United
- Hawick Waverley
- Highfields United
- Langholm Legion
- Langlee Amateurs
- Tweedmouth Amateurs

=== B Division ===
- Ancrum
- Berwick Town
- Biggar United
- Coldstream Amateurs
- Gala Fairydean Rovers Amateurs
- Gala Hotspur
- Hawick Legion
- Jed Legion
- Kelso Thistle
- Leithen Rovers
- Selkirk Victoria
- St Boswells
- Stow
- Tweeddale Rovers
