= Walter Rutherfurd =

Scottish-American soldier and merchant

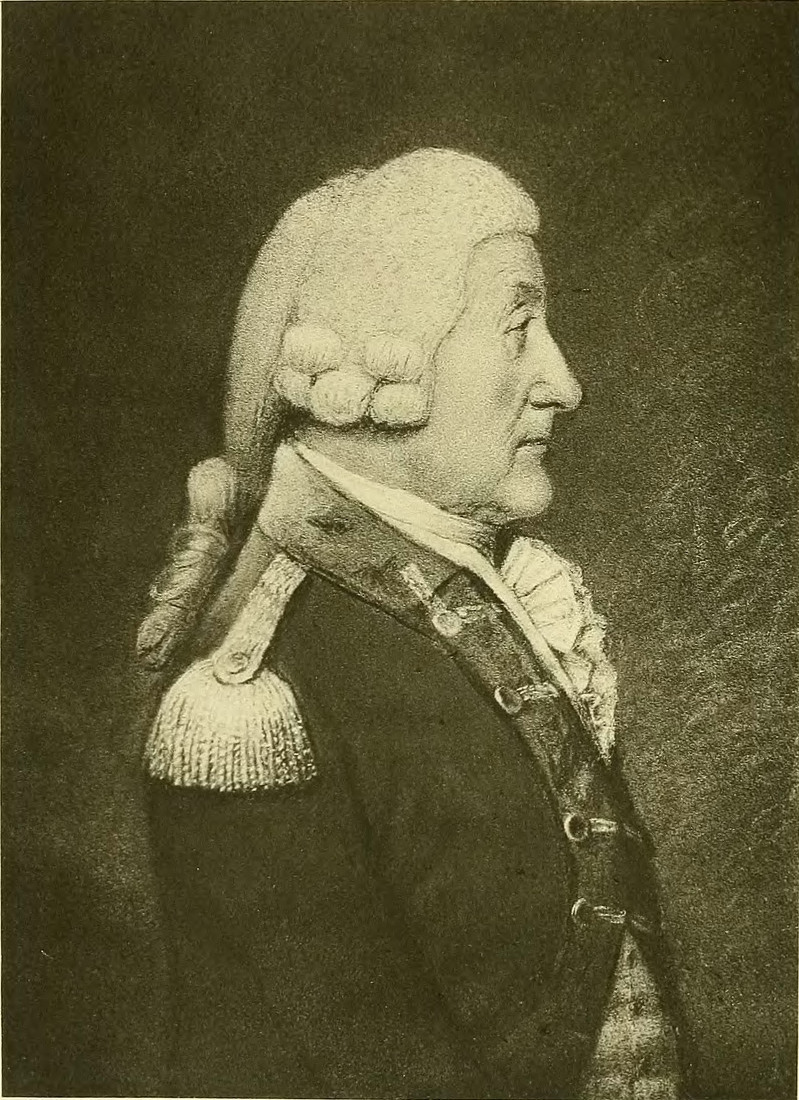

President of the Saint Andrew's Society of the State of New York
- In office 1792–1798
- Preceded by: Robert R. Livingston
- Succeeded by: Robert Lenox
- In office 1766–1767
- Preceded by: Alexander Colden
- Succeeded by: Peter Middleton

Personal details
- Born: 29 December 1723 Edgerston, Scotland
- Died: January 10, 1804 (aged 80) New York City, U.S.
- Spouse: Catherine Alexander (m. 1758; died 1801)
- Relations: John Rutherfurd (brother); Robert Rutherfurd (brother)
- Children: John Rutherfurd; Mary Rutherfurd Clarkson
- Parent(s): Sir John Rutherfurd; Elizabeth Cairncross Rutherfurd

Walter Rutherfurd (29 December 1723 – 10 January 1804) was a Scottish-American soldier and merchant who served as the president of the Saint Andrew's Society of the State of New York.

== Early life ==
Rutherfurd was born on 29 December 1723, in Edgerston, Roxburghshire, Scotland. He was the sixth son of nineteen children born to Sir John Rutherfurd and Elizabeth (née Cairncross) Rutherfurd, who married in 1710. Among his siblings was elder brother John Rutherfurd, who commanded an attack on the French at Fort Niagara in 1748 and was killed at Fort Ticonderoga on 8 July 1758, during the Battle of Carillon. A younger brother, Sir Robert Rutherfurd, was created a Baron of Russia by Catherine the Great in 1768.

His paternal grandparents were Thomas Rutherfurd of Teviotdale and Susannah (née Riddell) Rutherfurd, and he was eleventh in descent from James Rutherfurd of Clan Rutherford, who was granted the manorial lands of Edgerston in 1492 by King James IV of Scotland.

== Career ==
In 1738, at age fifteen, he entered the Royal Navy. He served until 1746 when he joined the Army of the Kingdom of Great Britain as an officer in the Royal Scots Regiment, serving as paymaster during the Flanders and German campaigns.

When the French and Indian War began in 1756, he sailed to British America and joined the Royal and Colonial forces as a captain of Grenadiers in the 4th Battalion of the Royal American Regiment, eventually becoming promoted to Judge Advocate and a Major in the Colonial Army. During the War, he "received the terms of surrender" of Fort Niagara and when Montreal was captured, the keys of the city were given to him.

After retiring from active duty, he received a patent of five thousand acres in the Province of New Jersey, in 1760 and 1775, for his military service (in addition to the lands he gained due to his marriage). During the American Revolution, even though he was a Loyalist, he "took no active part in the dispute and subsequent warfare," and retired to his estate in New Jersey, essentially a hostage of the Patriots, during the Revolutionary War.

=== Post-Revolutionary War ===
After the War ended, Rutherfurd returned to New York and entered the importing business and at Hunterdon County, New Jersey. His extensive connections with England enabled his firm to grow and he became one of the wealthiest citizens in New York. In 1771, he was a founder of the New York Hospital and for which he served as governor from 1774 to 1778, as well as an owner of a share of the Tontine Coffee House in 1796.

Rutherfurd was a founder, and one of the original members, of the Saint Andrew's Society of the State of New York, serving as Assistant from 1761 to 1766, first vice-president from 1785 to 1787 and president, twice, from 1766 to 1767 and, again, from 1792 to 1798.

== Personal life ==
Coat of Arms of Walter Rutherfurd

On 21 December 1758, he was married to Catherine Alexander (1727–1801) in New York. Catherine was the daughter of James Alexander and Mary Alexander Provoost. Among her siblings were William Alexander, Lord Stirling, Mary Alexander (wife of Peter Van Brugh Livingston), Elizabeth Alexander (wife of John Stevens) and Susannah Alexander (Wife of British Army Officer John Reid). Together, they were the parents of:

- John Rutherfurd (1760–1840), a U.S. Senator who married Helena Magdalena Morris (1762–1840), daughter of Continental Congressman Lewis Morris.
- Mary Rutherfurd (1761–1786), who married Maj. Gen. Matthew Clarkson.

Rutherfurd died at his residence in New York City on 10 January 1804, and was interred at the family vault at Trinity All Saints Cemetery in Princeton, New Jersey.

=== Descendants ===
Through his son John, he was a grandfather of eight, including Mary Rutherfurd (1784–1868); Robert Walter Rutherfurd (1788–1852), a member of the New Jersey State Legislature (who inherited his share in the Tontine Coffee House); Helena Rutherfurd (1790–1873), who married Peter Gerard Stuyvesant (the 2x-great-grandson of Peter Stuyvesant and one of the wealthiest New Yorkers in his lifetime); and Louisa Morris Rutherfurd (1792–1857).

Through his daughter Mary, he was a grandfather of Mary Rutherfurd Clarkson (1786–1838), who married her cousin Peter Augustus Jay, the eldest son of Chief Justice John Jay and Sarah Van Brugh (née Livingston) Jay, in 1807.
