= Border Cup =

- Founded: 1890
- Abolished: 1956
- Region: Scottish Borders
- Most championships: Vale of Leithen F.C. (12)

The Border Cup was an association football cup competition for clubs in the Scottish Borders. The competition was founded in 1890 and was last competed for in the 1955–56 season.

== Format ==
The competition was a knock-out tournament contested by the member clubs of the Border Counties Football Association.

== Initial entrants ==
- Kelso Athletic
- Hawick Rangers
- Peebles Rovers
- Selkirk
- Vale of Gala

== History ==
The Border Counties Association was founded in 1890, with Alexander Laing Brown MP as President. The first competition was held in 1890–91, and was won by Selkirk, who beat Hawick Rangers 4–3 in a thrilling game in which Rangers claimed (in vain) to have scored a late equalizer.

The competition was unfinished in 1928–29 and 1948–49. The latter abandonment was due to the Association not being able to arrange a second replay of the semi-final between Gala Fairydean and Peebles Rovers. The winner of the other semi-final, Berwick Rangers, was so put out by this that it withdrew from the Association. Berwick did at least have the biggest win in the final, 7–0 against Coldstream in 1927–28. It was something of a revenge as Coldstream's first triumph in the competition, in 1922–23, had come after Rangers had beaten it in the semi-final, but Coldstream was re-instated after Rangers refused to travel to the final in Peebles without a £25 gate guarantee.

The final competition, in 1955–56, was won by Eyemouth United, reserve centre-forward Burns scoring twice in each half to secure an easy 4–0 win over Gala Fairydean at Coldstream.

== Wins by club ==
Team	Wins	First win	Last win
Berwick Rangers	5	1906–07	1929–30
Chirnside United	1	1935–36	-
Civil Service Strollers	3	1926–27	-
Coldstream	3	1911–12	1924–25
Duns	3	1891–92	1937–38
Eyemouth United	2	1954–55	1955–56
Gala Fairydean	3	1913–14	1947–48
Jed Arts	1	1936–37	-
Peebles Rovers	8	1893–94	1952–53
Penicuik Athletic	1	1949–50	-
Selkirk	11	1890–91	1938–39
Vale of Leithen	12	1898–99	1953–54

The only side to reach the final more than once without ever winning was Kelso, which was runner-up three times; the first time, in 1897–98, it squandered a 3–0 lead against Peebles Rovers to lose 4-3, and also missed a penalty.
