= Sir George Douglas, 2nd Baronet =

Scottish army officer and politician

Sir George Douglas, 2nd Baronet (1 March 1754 – 4 June 1821) was a Scottish soldier and politician.

== Biography ==
The eldest son of Admiral Sir James Douglas, 1st Baronet, of Springwood Park, he succeeded to the title in 1787. From 1784 to 1806 he sat in Parliament for Roxburghshire, through the influence of the Duke of Roxburghe. On 16 October 1786 he married Lady Elizabeth Boyle, daughter of John Boyle, 3rd Earl of Glasgow; they had a son and two daughters.

Baronetage of Great Britain
Preceded by James Douglas	Baronet (of Maxwell); 1787–1821	Succeeded by John Scott-Douglas
