= Borders Buses =

Local and regional bus operator based in Berwick-upon-Tweed, England

Borders Buses Ltd.
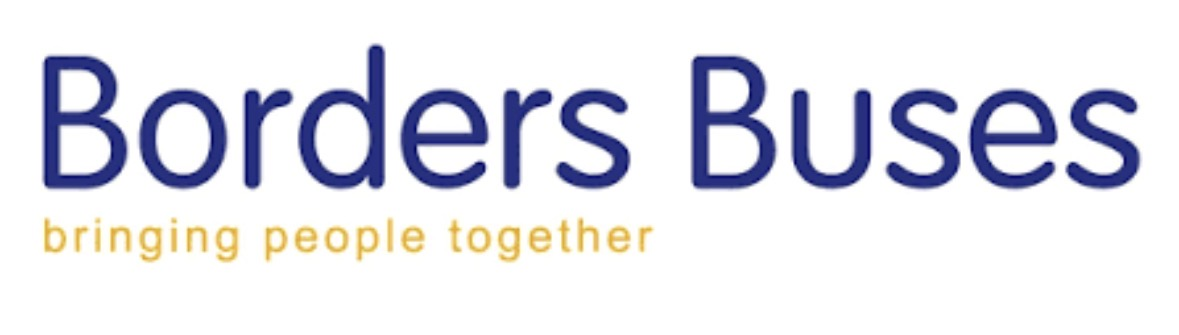

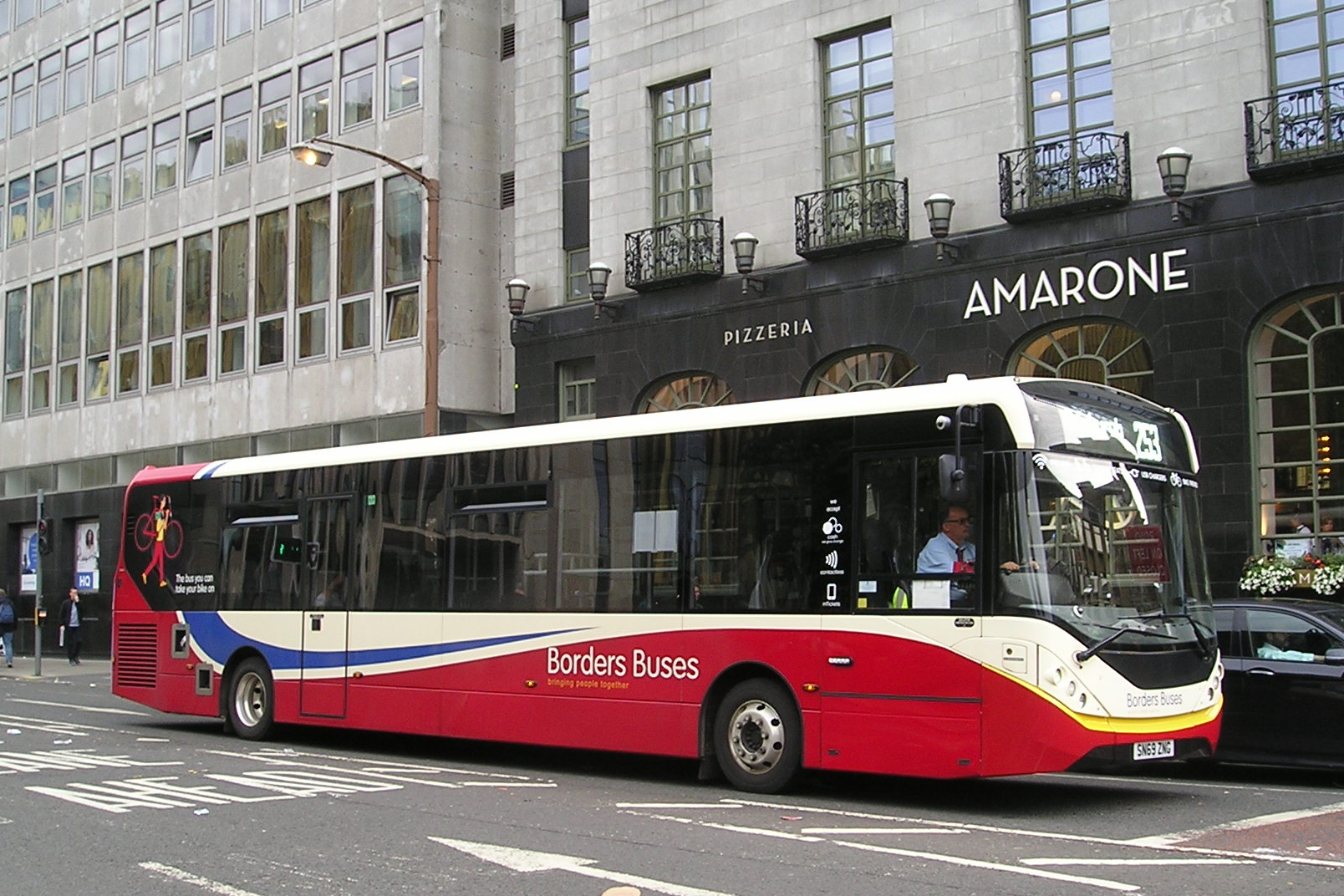
- Parent: West Coast Motors
- Founded: 1972; 54 years ago
- Headquarters: Berwick-upon-Tweed, England, UK
- Service area: Edinburgh; Cumbria; East Lothian; Midlothian; Northumberland; Scottish Borders
- Service type: Bus and coach
- Depots: 3
- Managing Director: Colin Robert Craig
- Website: www.bordersbuses.co.uk

Borders Buses is a local and regional bus operator based in Berwick-upon-Tweed, England. It operates services in Edinburgh, East Lothian, Midlothian and Scottish Borders in Scotland, as well as Cumbria and Northumberland in England. It is a subsidiary of West Coast Motors.

== History ==
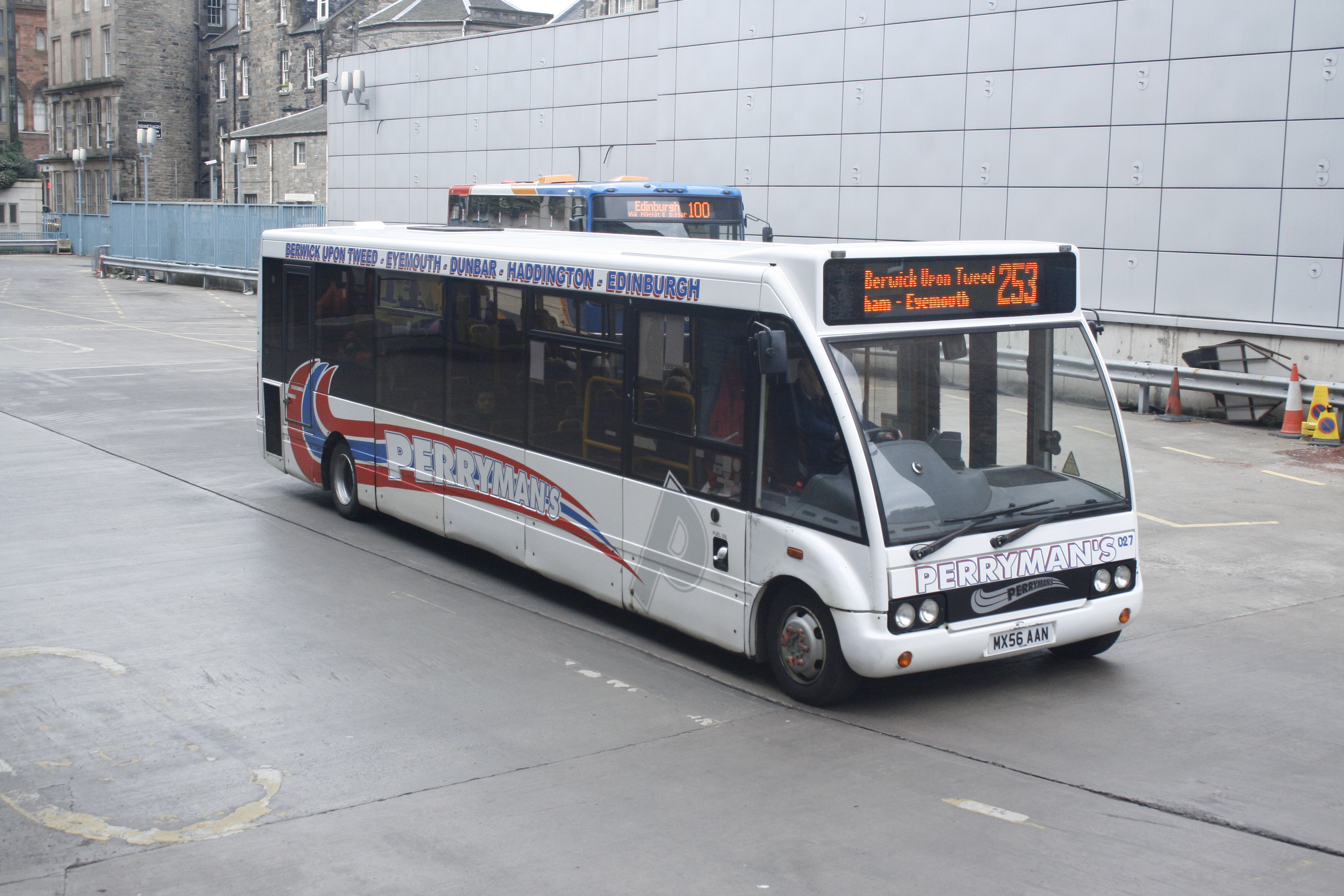
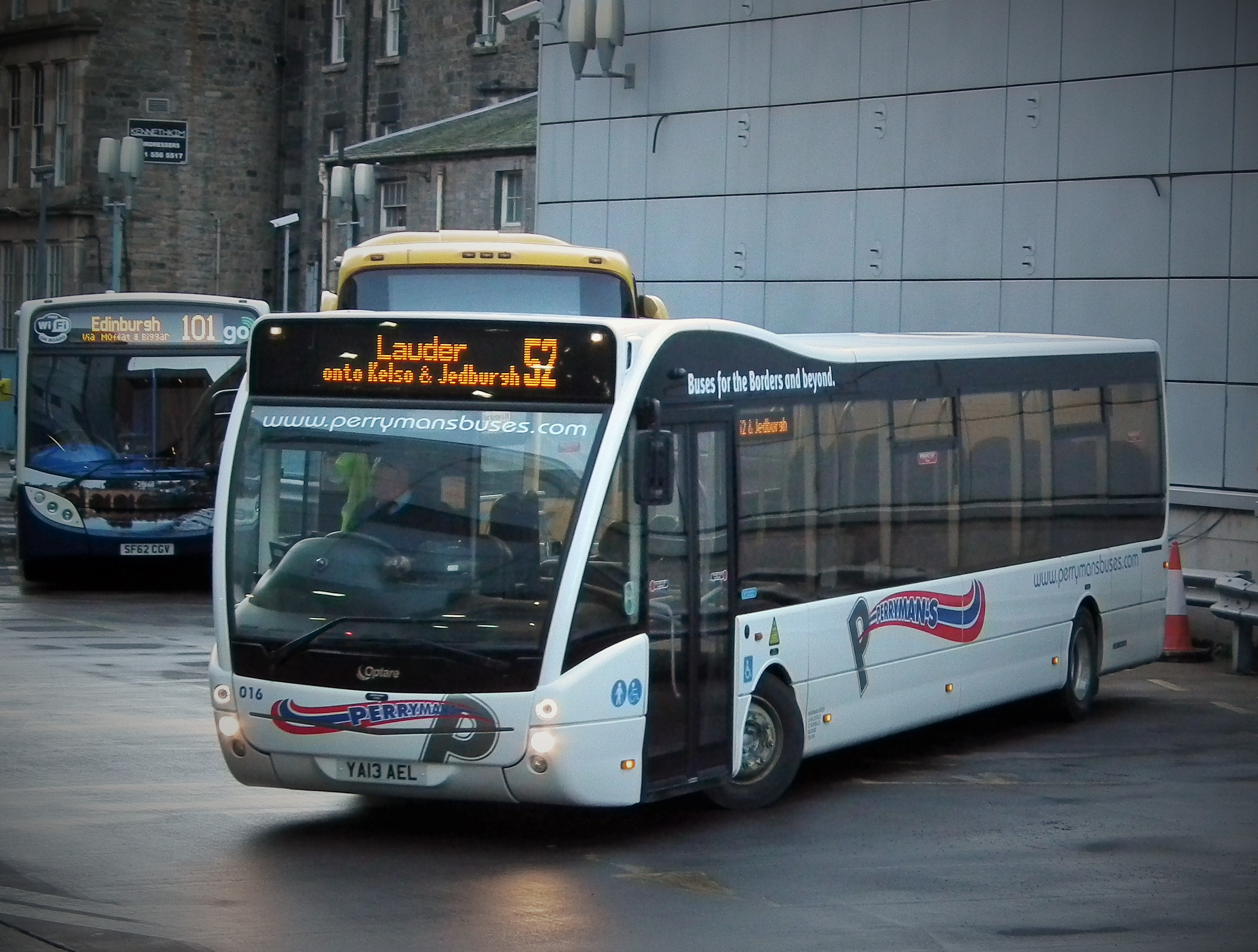
A Perryman's Buses branded Optare Solo (top) and Optare Versa (bottom)

The company, formerly known as Perryman's Buses, began in 1972, operating as a taxi service in the village of Burnmouth, Scottish Borders. Following expansion over the next four decades, Perryman's moved to larger premises at Ramparts Business Park, Berwick-upon-Tweed in 2002.

Following the closure of Munro's of Jedburgh in July 2013, Perryman's was awarded a contract from Scottish Borders Council, valued at £10.4 million, to operate a number of routes in Northumberland, Midlothian, and Scottish Borders.

This expansion saw the opening of a second depot, in the village of St Boswells, and created a total of 27 jobs. The new operation required additional vehicles, with a total of twelve high-specification Optare Versa single-deck vehicles delivered in September 2013 – the company's largest ever vehicle order at the time.

In February 2016, Perryman's Buses was purchased by West Coast Motors. The sale included 45 vehicles, as well as depots at Berwick-upon-Tweed and St Boswells. Later in the same year, the company took over several services from First Scotland East. The remainder of First's operations in the Scottish Borders, including the depot at Galashiels and its outstations at Hawick, Kelso and Peebles were sold to West Coast Motors in March 2017 – with a subsequent rebrand to Borders Buses in July 2017.

Further expansion in the Scottish Borders over the next few years saw the company acquire routes from BARC Coach Hire in January 2018, as well as Buskers in September 2019.

The company has recently seen significant investment in vehicles, as well as real-time service information, and ticketing systems. In April 2019, three bike-friendly Alexander Dennis Enviro 400 MMC vehicles were introduced on to route X62 – representing an investment of about £750,000. The launch of these new vehicles coincided with the launch of full contactless payment acceptance across the Borders Buses network.

Subsequently, ten bike-friendly Alexander Dennis Enviro 200 MMC vehicles were delivered towards the end of 2019, with a further ten being delivered in February 2020, at a cost of £3.25 million. These vehicles currently operate on routes 253, X62 and X95, and feature audio-visual next stop announcements, leather seats, tables and charging points.

In March 2020, it was announced that Borders Buses was granted a five-year contract, valued at £4 million, to commercially operate the remaining Scottish Borders Council core bus network – including the operation of routes 51, 52, 60, 67 and 68. As well as this, the company will work in partnership with Scottish Borders Council to improve bus stops, the provision of real-time information and bus priority measures.

== Fleet and operations ==
=== Depots ===
As of June 2024, the company operates from two depots: Galashiels and Berwick-upon-Tweed.

=== Vehicles ===
The fleet consists mainly of diesel-powered single and double-deck buses manufactured by Alexander Dennis and Optare.

== Branding ==
In July 2017, following the sale of Perryman's Buses to West Coast Motors, the business was rebranded as Borders Buses. This saw the introduction of a new cream and red corporate livery, featuring a blue stripe along the length of the vehicle, as well as a new logo. Some vehicles operating on key routes have received route-specific branding, based on the corporate livery. Prior to rebranding, vehicles wore the Perryman's Buses livery, which consisted of a white base with a red and blue stripe along the length of the vehicle.
