= Oxnam =

Coordinates: 55.458139°N 2.477222°W

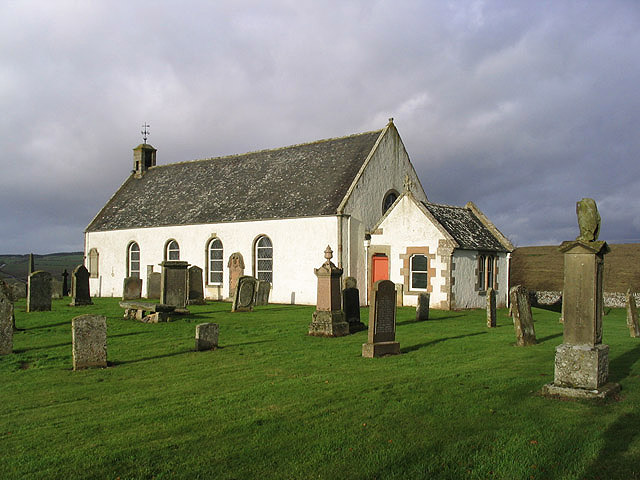
- Oxnam church

- Location within the Scottish Borders
- OS grid reference: NT698183
- Council area: Scottish Borders
- Lieutenancy area: Roxburgh, Ettrick and Lauderdale
- Country: Scotland
- Sovereign state: United Kingdom
- Post town: JEDBURGH
- Postcode district: TD8
- Dialling code: 01835
- Police: Scotland
- Fire: Scottish
- Ambulance: Scottish
- UK Parliament: Berwickshire, Roxburgh and Selkirk
- Scottish Parliament: Ettrick, Roxburgh and Berwickshire

Oxnam (Scots: Owsenam) is a village near Jedburgh, in Roxburghshire in the Scottish Borders area of Scotland. It is a primarily residential village.

The placename Oxnam is from Old English oxa (genitive oxan) "oxen" and ham "village", the meaning being "village where ox are bred". The name was recorded as Oxenamm in 1148, and sometimes known as Oxenham.

Current local placenames include Oxnam Green, Oxnam Kirk, Oxnam Mains, Oxnam Neuk, Oxnam Pond, Oxnam Row, Oxnam Sawmill, Borthwick Estate and Oxnam School. In 2026, local street "Oxnam Neuk" was renamed "Finlay Grieve Way" to commemorate a local stalwart who lived until the age of 108.

The village became notable in 2025 for hosting a Ba' game, becoming the first "new ba" since Ancrum ba' was revived in the 1970s. The inaugural game was won by the uppies 3-2, with Finlay Grieve Jr. and Finlay Borthwick hailing for the win.

Dere Street passes through the village. Other places nearby include Bairnkine, Camptown, Crailing, Crailinghall, Hownam, Kelso, Newbigging.

== See also ==
- List of places in the Scottish Borders
- List of places in Scotland
