= List of listed buildings in Roxburgh, Scottish Borders =

This is a list of listed buildings in the parish of Roxburgh in the Scottish Borders, Scotland.

== List ==
Name	Location	Date Listed	Grid Ref. (Note: Sometimes known as OSGB36, the grid reference (where provided) is based on the British national grid reference system used by the Ordnance Survey. • "Guide to National Grid". Ordnance Survey. • "Get-a-map". Ordnance Survey.)	Geo-coordinates	Notes	LB Number (Note: Historic Environment Scotland assign a unique alphanumeric identifier to each designated site in Scotland, for listed buildings this always begins with "LB", for example "LB12345".)	Image
Sunlaws Hotel Stable Range				55°33′32″N 2°28′10″W	Category B	19713	Upload Photo
Footbridge, Roxburgh Viaduct				55°33′59″N 2°28′27″W	Category B	15100	Upload Photo
Sunlaws Hotel And Gatepiers				55°33′31″N 2°28′09″W	Category B	15101	Upload Photo
Roxburgh Church And Graveyard				55°34′08″N 2°28′38″W	Category B	15095	Upload Photo
Fairnington House				55°32′42″N 2°33′45″W	Category B	19712	Upload Photo
Railway Viaduct, Roxburgh				55°33′59″N 2°28′27″W	Category A	15097	Upload another image
Kersmains				55°34′45″N 2°28′28″W	Category B	15098	Upload Photo
Baron's Folly				55°32′01″N 2°34′35″W	Category C(S)	15099	Upload Photo
Roxburgh Castle				55°35′47″N 2°27′25″W	Category B	13874	Upload Photo

== Key ==
The scheme for classifying buildings in Scotland is:

- Category A: "buildings of national or international importance, either architectural or historic; or fine, little-altered examples of some particular period, style or building type."
- Category B: "buildings of regional or more than local importance; or major examples of some particular period, style or building type, which may have been altered."
- Category C: "buildings of local importance; lesser examples of any period, style, or building type, as originally constructed or moderately altered; and simple traditional buildings which group well with other listed buildings."

In March 2016 there were 47,288 listed buildings in Scotland. Of these, 8% were Category A, and 50% were Category B, with the remaining 42% being Category C.
