= Nick Watt (CNN reporter) =

Television journalist

Nick Watt is a California-based Scottish reporter for CNN, and an occasional anchor on CNN International. Prior to joining CNN in 2018, he was a producer and then a correspondent with ABC News for 20 years. He hosted Watts World on the Travel Channel.

Watt has won two Emmy Awards, one for his reporting from Fallujah, Iraq in 2004, and another as a producer for work in Darfur, Sudan. He is also the voice of "Zito", the elephant, in the Disney series The Lion Guard.

== Early life ==
Watt was born in Paisley, Scotland and raised in Scotland, Thailand, Malaysia, Turkey and South Africa. He has a master's degree in Modern History from the University of St. Andrews in Scotland with a focus on post-war U.S. foreign policy.

== Career ==
Watt began his career as a reporter for the Southampton Press newspaper from 1995 until 1997.

Watt started at ABC's London bureau in 1997 as a desk assistant and tape librarian. He spent 15 years based in London covering stories across the world, including wars in Iraq, Afghanistan and Liberia along with the odd royal wedding. He moved to Los Angeles with ABC News in 2012, before moving to CNN in 2018.

== Personal life ==
Watt lives in Santa Monica, California. He is married with children. His wife was born in South Africa. His hobbies include cricket and rugby.
