= Chirnside United F.C. =

Association football club in Scotland

Chirnside United
- Full name: Chirnside United Football Club
- Founded: 1890; 136 years ago
- Ground: Comrades Park, Chirnside
- Coordinates: 55°48′12″N 2°12′29″W
- Chairman: James Bolton
- Manager: Graham Paterson
- League: Border AFL A League
- 2018–19: Border AFL A League, 6th of 10
Home colours

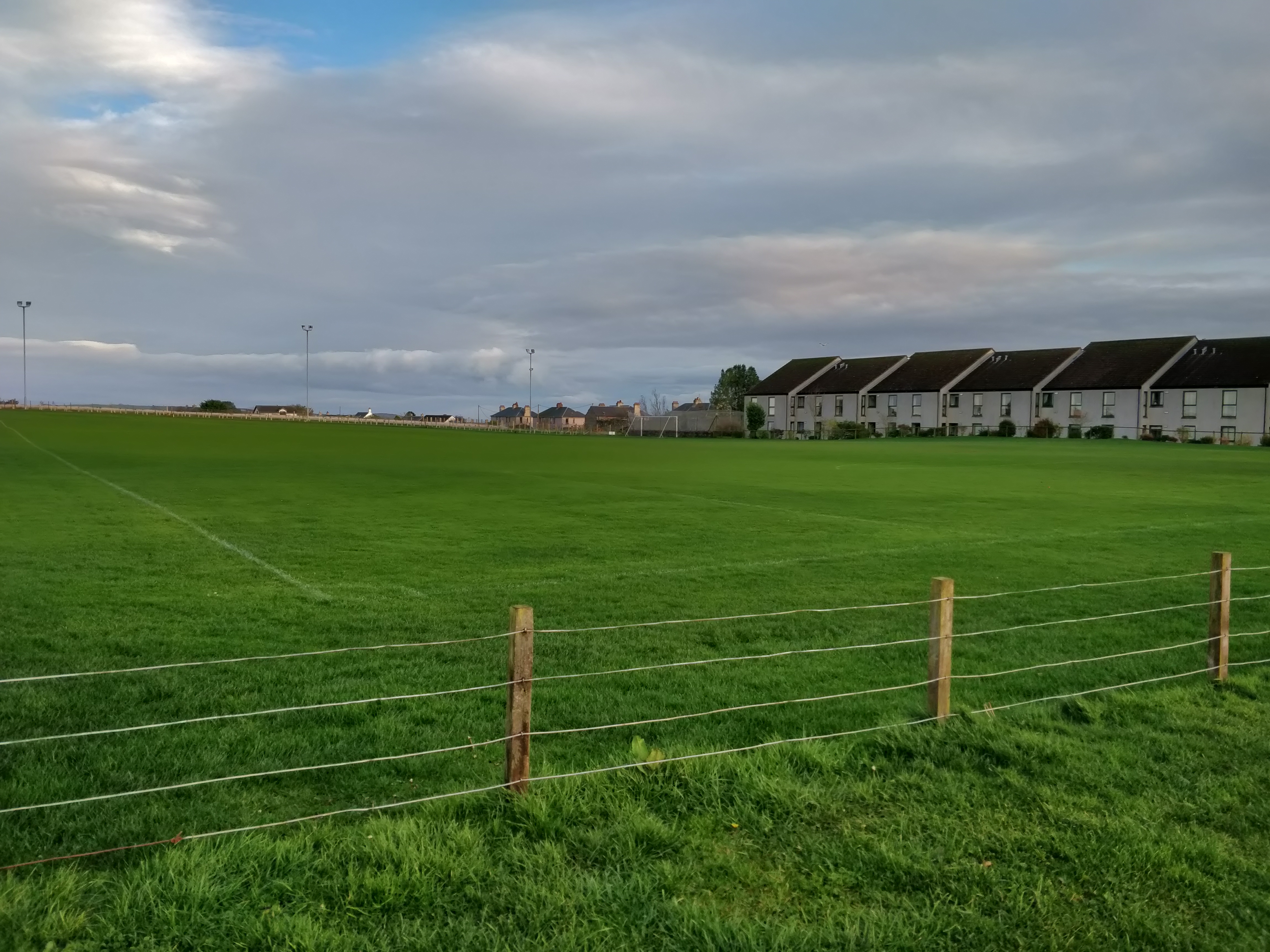
Comrades Park, the ground of Chirnside United.

Chirnside United Football Club, previously known as Chirnside F.C., is a Scottish amateur football club based in the village of Chirnside in the Scottish Borders. They play in the 'A league' of the Border Amateur Football League, which is affiliated to the Scottish Amateur Football Association. Their home ground is Comrades Park. Formed in 1890, they were formerly a senior club playing in the East of Scotland Football League and have appeared in the Scottish Cup.

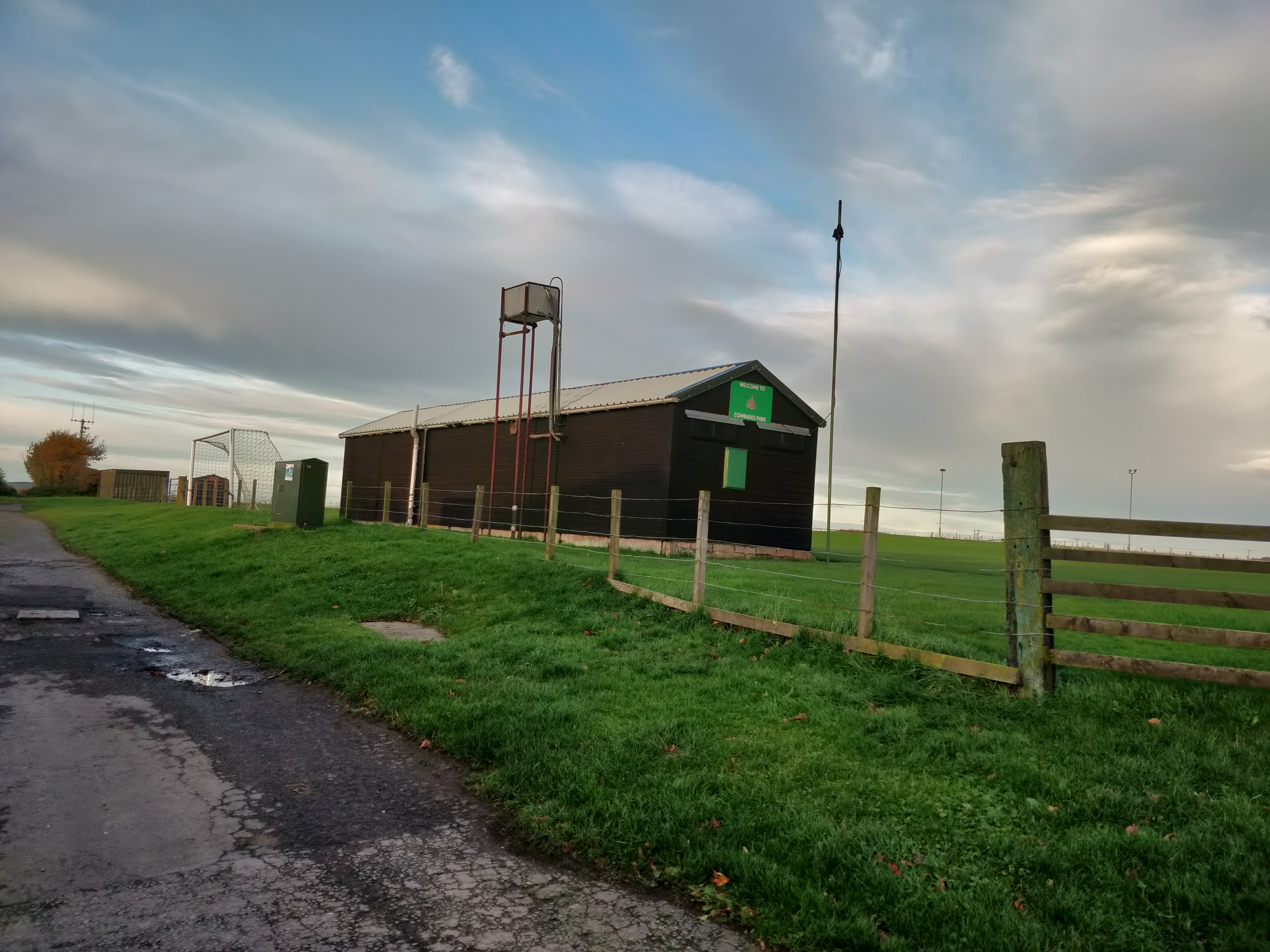
The Clubhouse at Comrades Park, the ground of Chirnside United.

== History ==
The club was founded in 1890, and won their first silverware, The Dudley Cup, in 1920. They entered the Berwickshire Junior League in 1925. In 1930 they entered the Border Amateur League and the following year they joined the East of Scotland League where they played until 1939. Their most successful season being 1934-35 where they finished runners up.

In 1935 they played in the Scottish Cup for the first time, losing 7–1 at home to Forfar Athletic. Chirnside United reached the first round of the Scottish Cup eight times between 1935 and 1967 but never made it past the first round, although they did take Elgin City to a replay in 1936.

They again played in the East of Scotland League from 1966 to 1968 and again between 1976 and 1978. Since 1979 they have played in the Border Amateur League. In 1994-95 they won all the Border AFA league and cup games, losing only two games in the process. They have won the South of Scotland Cup on three occasions 1989, 2005 and 2009.

Arsenal manager Herbert Chapman was honorary president of Chirnside United until his death in 1934.
