= Jed Water =

River in Scottish Borders, Scotland

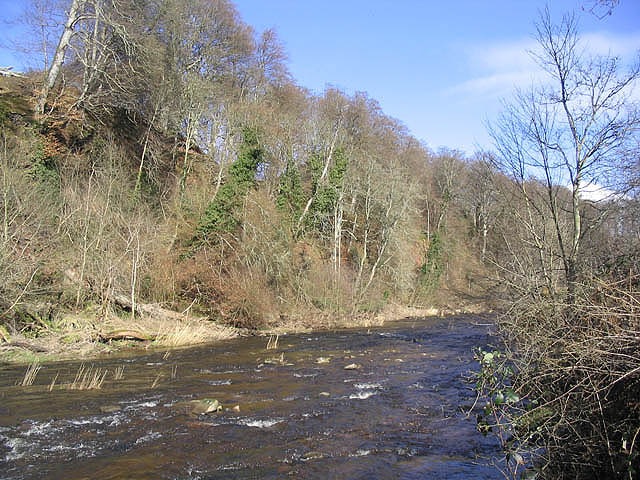
- The Jed Water near Jedburgh

Physical characteristics
- Source: Carlin Tooth
  - location: 1 mile from England in the Cheviot Hills
  - coordinates: 55°18′55″N 2°34′50″W
- Mouth: Jedfoot Bridge
  - location: north of Jedburgh, Scotland
- Length: 21.75 miles (35.00 km)
- Depth
  - minimum: 0.37 metres (1.2 ft)
  - maximum: 2.33 metres (7.6 ft) (exceptionally 3.5 metres (11 ft))

Basin features
- River system: River Tweed

The Jed Water is a river and a tributary of the River Teviot in the Borders region of Scotland.

In total the Jed Water is over 21.75 miles (35.00 km) long and it falls 1,375 feet (0.419 km). It flows into the Teviot near Jedfoot Bridge (grid reference NT660243) two miles north of Jedburgh. Jed Water rises from a source on Carlin Tooth 55°18′55″N 2°34′50″W in the Cheviot Hills where it is first known as Raven Burn.

== Description ==
The river in past times was the main source of water for the monks living in Jedburgh Abbey. It also powered a watermill in the town of Jedburgh although this no longer exists. It gives its name to Jedburgh and Jedforest. In the 1800s it had trout in the river. The Ordnance gazetteer said Jed Water "in the parts immediately above the town of Jedburgh ... more of the elements of fine landscape than during a whole day's ride in the most favourite Scottish haunts of tourists." The guide drew attention to the pure waters, the brisk currents, the steep landscapes and the contrasts which it thought picturesque.

The name Jed is of obscure origin. James has suggested that it may derive from Proto-Indo-European *wei(h_{1})- d- "a bend, something curved or twisted". He also notes that Scots Gedde- in Jedburgh may have been adopted from Cumbric gwï:δ "a wood", and that the river name may be a back-formation.

In 1787 James Hutton created modern geology when he discovered Hutton's Unconformity at Inchbonny, Jedburgh, in layers of sedimentary rock on the banks of the Jed Water. He later wrote of how he "rejoiced at my good fortune in stumbling upon an object so interesting in the natural history of the earth, and which I had been long looking for in vain".

== Flooding ==
Jed Water is liable to flood, so the river levels are monitored near the old Canongate Bridge. The depth is usually between 0.37 metres (1.2 ft) and 2.33 metres (7.6 ft) metres deep but it has been as deep as 3.5 metres (11 ft) which it reached in January 2016. In 2020 there was a problem when the flood defences in Jedburgh were breached by debris in one storm just before another storm hit. Luckily repairs were made and serious flooding was avoided.

== See also ==
- Borders Abbeys Way
- List of places in the Scottish Borders
- List of places in Scotland
