= Edgerston =

Village in Scotland

Coordinates: 55.396°N 2.4900°W

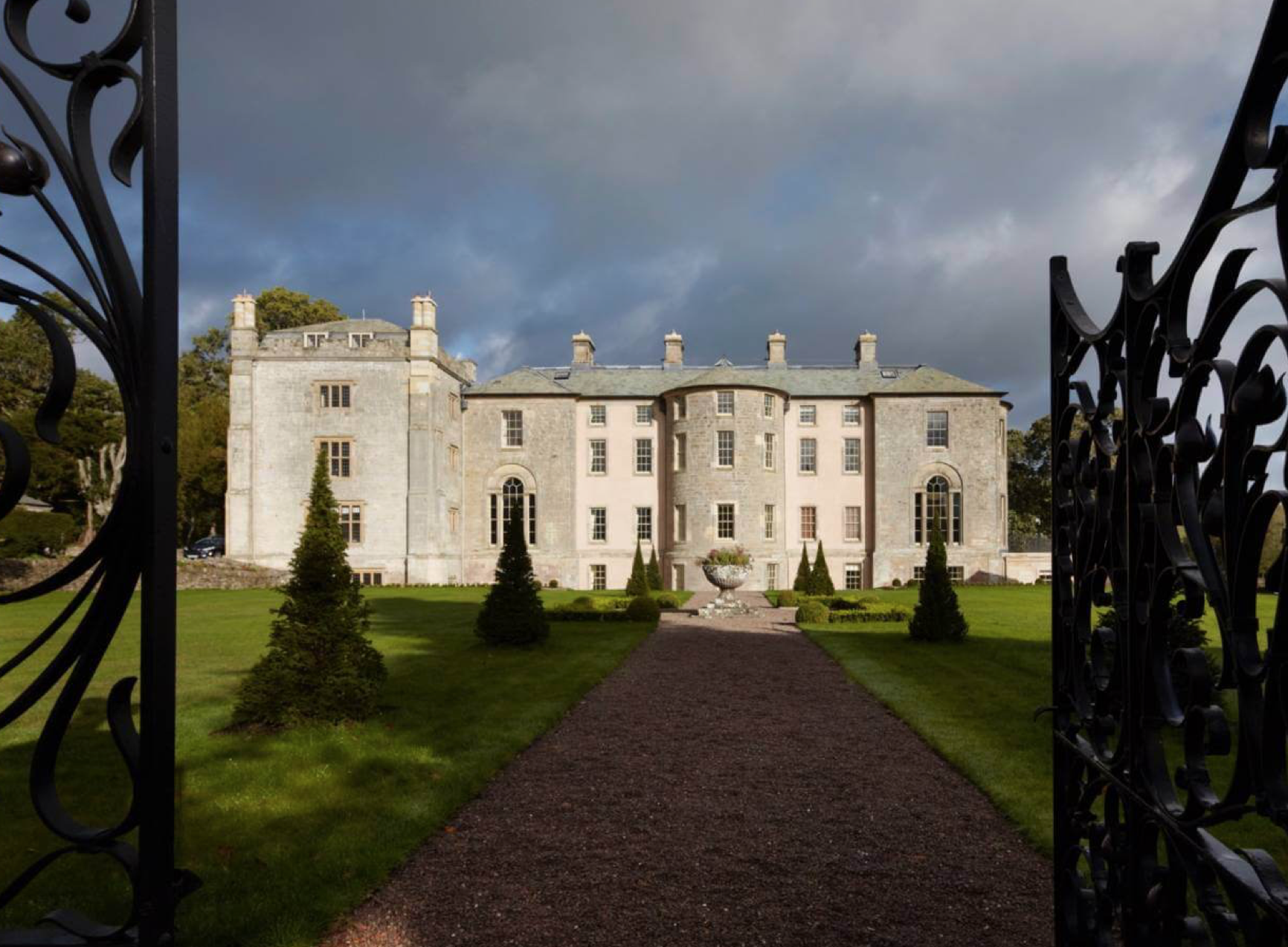
- Edgerston House

- Location within the Scottish Borders
- OS grid reference: NT685114
- Council area: Scottish Borders
- Lieutenancy area: Roxburgh, Ettrick and Lauderdale
- Country: Scotland
- Sovereign state: United Kingdom
- Post town: JEDBURGH
- Postcode district: TD8
- Dialling code: 01835
- Police: Scotland
- Fire: Scottish
- Ambulance: Scottish
- UK Parliament: Berwickshire, Roxburgh and Selkirk
- Scottish Parliament: Ettrick, Roxburgh and Berwickshire

Edgerston is a village and an estate about 4 miles (6.4 km) north of the Anglo-Scottish border, and 8 miles (13 km) south of Jedburgh in the Scottish Borders area of Scotland in the former Roxburghshire.

According to the Clan Rutherfurd family history site, Edgerston was part of the Rutherfurd family estate since at least 1448. Thomas Rutherfurd built Edgerston House in 1695, John Rutherfurd added two new wings in 1793, and a tower was added by William Rutherfurd-Oliver in 1840. The estate was sold to Frederick Scott Oliver in 1915. The Olivers owned Edgerston estate until 1980, when it was sold and divided up. A bust of FS Oliver is displayed in the village hall. The current owner, Johannes De Gier, bought the house and land in 2006 and commenced a major renovation project lasting several years.

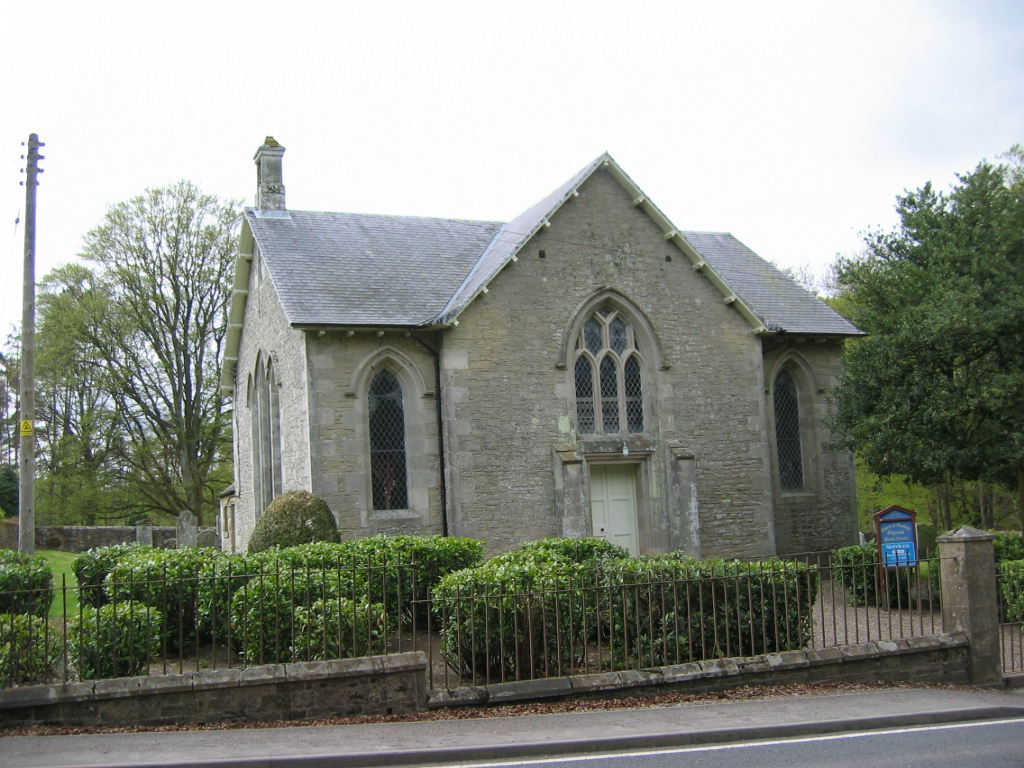
Edgerston Church

Edgerston church was built in 1838. The church is still in use to this day, and local children were invited to ring the bells on the eve of the millennium. The village school had a role of 60 children in 1880, but has since closed and is now a guest house. Children then attended nearby Glendouglas Primary School, which has also since closed; schooling now takes place at the Jedburgh Intergenerational Community Campus. The estate forge, 'Edgerston Rink Smithy', is now privately owned and has been run as a guest house.

The remains of a peel tower are situated on the hill above Edgerston House, used as defence against the Kerrs and other feuding families.

Other places nearby include Bonchester Bridge, Camptown, Ferniehirst Castle, Hobkirk, the Jed Water, Oxnam, Southdean.

== See also ==
- List of places in the Scottish Borders
- List of places in Scotland
