= John Murray =

John Murray or Murry may refer to:

== Arts and media ==
=== Literature and music ===
- John Murray (publishing house), a British publishing house, founded by John Murray (1745–1793)
- John Murray (publisher, born 1778) (died 1843), second head of the publishing house
- John Murray III (1808–1892), third head of the publishing house
- John Murray (Australian writer) (born 1963), Australian epidemiologist and writer
- John Murray (novelist) (born 1950), British novelist
- John Middleton Murry (1889–1957), writer
- John Middleton Murry Jr. (1926–2002), English writer
- John Murry (musician) (born 1979), American musician
- John Murray Graham (1809–1881), Scottish historian, in early life John Murray

=== Screen, radio and performing arts ===
- John Murray (Irish broadcaster) (born 1964), Irish broadcaster and journalist
- John Murray (playwright) (1906–1984), American playwright, co-author of Room Service
- John Murray (sports broadcaster) (born 1966), English sports commentator
- John T. Murray (1886–1957), Australian-born actor
- Johnny Murray (voice actor) (1904–1956), known for Bosko, the first star of Warner Brothers cartoons
- John B. Murray (filmmaker) (1931/1932–2020), Australian filmmaker and author

== Sportspeople ==
=== Association football ===
- John Murray (footballer, born 1865) (1865–1922), Scottish international footballer who played club football for Vale of Leven, Sunderland, and Blackburn Rovers
- John Murray (footballer, born 1874) (c. 1874–1933), Scottish international footballer who played club football for Renton and Dundee
- John Murray (Irish footballer) (fl. 1890s)
- John Murray (footballer, born 1927) (1927–1988), England footballer who played club football for Gillingham
- John Murray (footballer, born 1948) (born 1948), English footballer

=== Other uses in sportspeople ===
- John Murray (athlete) (1881–?), Irish Olympic athlete who competed for Great Britain at the 1908 Summer Olympics
- Jack Murray (Australian footballer) (fl. 1935–1949), Australian rules footballer
- John Murray (boxer) (born 1984), lightweight English boxer
- John Murray (cricketer, born 1935) (1935–2018), English cricketer
- John Murray (cricketer, born 1873) (1873–1916), Scottish cricketer and RAF officer
- John Murray (cricketer, born 1882) (1882–1917), Scottish cricketer and British Army officer
- John Murray (ice hockey, born 1923) (1923–2017), British ice hockey player
- John Murray (ice hockey, born 1987), American ice hockey player
- John Murray (rugby union) (born 1942), Irish rugby union player
- John Murray (sports broadcaster) (born 1966), English broadcaster for BBC Radio 5 Live
- Johnny Murray (footballer) (1898–1954), Irish footballer during the 1920s

== Law and politics ==
=== United Kingdom and Britain ===
- John Murray, 1st Earl of Tullibardine (died 1609), Scottish courtier and leader of the Clan Murray
- John Murray, 1st Earl of Annandale (died 1640), Scottish courtier and MP for Guildford
- John Murray, Lord Bowhill (died 1714), MP in the first Parliament of Great Britain 1707–1708
- John Murray (died 1753), British MP for the Linlithgow Burghs, 1725–1734, Selkirkshire, 1734–1753
- Lord John Murray (1711–1787), British general and MP for Perthshire, 1734–1761
- Sir John Murray of Broughton (c. 1718–1777), Jacobite and secretary to Prince Charles Edward Stuart
- John Murray (1726–1800), British MP for the Linlithgow Burghs, 1754–1761
- John Murray, 3rd Duke of Atholl (1729–1774), MP for Perthshire 1761–1764, Lord of the Isle of Man from 1764 to 1765
- John Murray (colonial administrator) (c. 1739–1824), governor of the Cape Breton colony in today's Nova Scotia
- John Murray (British diplomat) (c. 1712–1775), ambassador to the Ottoman Empire 1765–1775
- John Murray (diplomat, born 1883) (1883–1937), British diplomat, envoy extraordinary and minister plenipotentiary to Mexico
- Sir John Murray, 8th Baronet (c. 1768–1827), British MP for Wootton Bassett 1807–1811, Weymouth & Melcombe Regis 1811–1818
- John Murray, 5th Duke of Atholl (1778–1846), British Army officer and landowner in Scotland
- John Murray, Lord Murray (1779–1859), British MP for the Leith Burghs, 1832–1839
- Sir Hubert Murray (John Hubert Plunkett Murray, 1861–1940), judge and lieutenant-governor of Papua
- John Murray, 11th Duke of Atholl (1929–2012), British peer

=== Scotland ===
- John Murray, 1st Earl of Atholl (c.1605-1642), Scottish nobleman
- John Murray, 1st Marquess of Atholl (1631–1703), leading Scottish royalist
- John Murray, 1st Duke of Atholl (1660–1724), Scottish nobleman and politician
- John Murray, 4th Earl of Dunmore (1730–1809), colonial governor of Virginia and later the Bahamas
- John Murray, 4th Duke of Atholl (1755–1830), Scottish peer
- John Wilson Murray (1840–1906), Scottish-born police detective who worked in the US and Canada during the late 19th/early 20th centuries
- John Murray (Liberal politician) (1879–1964), Scottish civil servant, university administrator and Liberal Party politician
- John Murray, Lord Dervaird (1935–2015), Scottish judge

=== Ireland ===
- John Murray (Monaghan MP) (1707–1743), MP for County Monaghan 1741–43
- John L. Murray (judge) (1943–2023), Irish judge

=== United States ===
- John Murray (Massachusetts politician) (1715?–1794), representative to the Great and General Court of the Province of Massachusetts Bay
- John Murray (congressman) (1768–1834), U.S. representative from Pennsylvania
- John F. Murray (politician) (1862–1928), second borough president of The Bronx
- John L. Murray (representative) (1806–1842), U.S. representative from Kentucky
- John Porry Murray (1830–1895), Confederate politician
- John E. Murray Jr. (1932–2015), professor of law and chancellor of Duquesne University in Pittsburgh, Pennsylvania
- John S. Murray (Iowa politician) (born 1939), American politician from the state of Iowa
- John S. Murray (Washington politician) (1925–2007), American politician in the state of Washington

=== Australia ===
- John Murray (pastoralist) (1837–1917), member of the Queensland Parliament from 1888 to 1903
- John Murray (Victorian politician) (1851–1916), premier of Victoria from 1909 to 1912
- John Murray (Queensland politician) (1915–2009), member of the Australian House of Representatives from 1958 to 1961
- John Murray (New South Wales politician) (born 1939), member of the New South Wales Legislative Assembly from 1982 to 2003

=== Other countries ===
- John Murray (judge) (1888–1976), chief justice of Southern Rhodesia from 1955 to 1961
- J. R. Murray (John Rose Murray, 1898–1991), Ceylonese accountant and politician in colonial Ceylon

== Military and police ==
- John Murray, 2nd Earl of Dunmore (1685–1752), Scottish peer and British Army general
- Sir John Murray, 8th Baronet (c. 1768–1827), general, led a brigade under the Duke of Wellington in the Peninsular War
- John Murray (Australian explorer) (c. 1775–c. 1807), Royal Navy officer
- John B. Murray (general) (1822–1884), American general
- John Ivor Murray (1824–1903), Scottish surgeon who practised in China, Hong Kong and then in Sebastopol in the Crimean War
- Sir John Irvine Murray (1826–1902), Scottish general who raised the 14th Murray's Jat Lancers
- John Murray (native police officer) (1827–1876), worked in Queensland, Australia
- John Murray (Irish soldier) (1837–1911), Irish recipient of the Victoria Cross
- John Murray (Australian Army general) (1892–1951), general in the Australian Army
- John M. Murray (born 1960), US Army general
- John E. Murray (1918–2008), US Army general
- Sir John Macgregor Murray, 1st Baronet (1745–1822), Scottish army officer

== Religion and theology ==
- John Murray (minister) (1741–1815), minister and inspirational figure sometimes called the "founder of American Universalism"
- John Gardner Murray (1857–1929), Episcopal bishop of Maryland and Presiding Bishop
- John Owen Farquhar Murray (1858–1944), Anglican clergyman and master of Selwyn College, Cambridge
- John Gregory Murray (1877–1956), Roman Catholic archbishop of Saint Paul
- John Murray (theologian) (1898–1975), Scottish-born Calvinist theologian and Presbyterian minister
- John J. Murray (1934–2020), pastor and author
- John W. Murray (1913–1996), pastor, evangelist, and president of Shelton College
- John Murray (provost of St Mary's Cathedral, Glasgow) (1901–1973), priest in the Scottish Episcopal Church
- John Courtney Murray (1904–1967), Jesuit priest and theologian
- John Murray (archdeacon of Dublin) (1916–2005), priest in the Church of Ireland
- John Murray (archdeacon of Cashel) (born 1945)
- John Murray (dean of Killaloe) (died 1790), Anglican priest in Ireland
- John Walton Murray, Irish Anglican priest and author

== Science ==
- John Murray (physician) (1778–1820), Scottish geologist and lecturer in various scientific subjects
- John Murray (science lecturer) (c. 1786–1851), Scottish geologist
- John Murray (photographer) (1809-1898), physician and photographer
- Sir John Murray (oceanographer) (1841–1914), Scots-Canadian marine biologist credited as the "father of modern oceanography"
- John O'Kane Murray (1847–1885), Irish physician and author
- John Murray (geographer) (1883–1940), Scottish educator and author
- John F. Murray (1927–2020), American pulmonologist and researcher

== Others ==
- John Murray (abolitionist) (1787–1849), leading light in Glasgow Emancipation Society
- John Murray (Naperville founder) (1785–1868), one of the original settlers of Naperville, Illinois in 1831
- John Murray (sheep breeder), father (c. 1812–1886), and son (1841–1908), breeders of merino sheep in South Australia
- John Lamb Murray (1838–1908), Scottish architect
- John Bunion Murray (1908–1988), self-taught artist in Glascock County, Georgia
- John Clark Murray (1836–1917), Scottish philosopher and professor

== See also ==
- Jon Murray (disambiguation)
- Jack Murray (disambiguation)
- Jock Murray (disambiguation)
