= John Murray (1726–1800) =

British politician

The Right Honourable John Murray
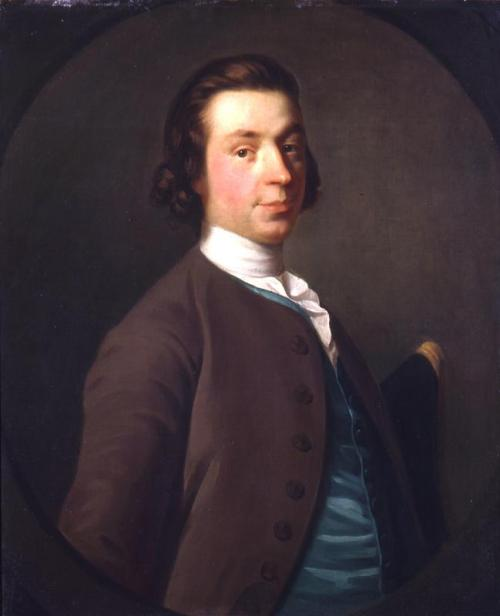
- painting by Allan Ramsay

Member of Parliament for Lanark Burghs
- In office 1754–1761
- Preceded by: James Carmichael
- Succeeded by: John Lockhart-Ross

Personal details
- Born: 4 April 1726
- Died: 28 February 1800 (aged 73) Jamaica
- Spouse: N. N. Thomson
- Relations: Sir James Murray, Lord Philiphaugh (grandfather); Lord Basil Hamilton (grandfather)
- Children: 7
- Parent(s): John Murray; Eleanor Hamilton
- Education: University of Glasgow

John Murray (4 April 1726 – 28 February 1800), of Philiphaugh, Selkirk, was a British politician who was the Member of Parliament for the Lanark Burghs, between 9 May 1754 and 20 April 1761.

== Early life ==
Murray was the second, but eldest surviving son of John Murray and the former Eleanor Hamilton (c. 1694–1783). His sister, Mary Murray, married Sir Alexander Don, 4th Baronet, and his brother, Charles Murray, was the father of Charles Scott-Murray of Danesfield House, MP for Buckinghamshire.

His paternal grandparents were Sir James Murray and Margaret Don (a daughter of Sir Alexander Don, 1st Baronet). His aunt, Ann Murray, was the wife of John Pringle, Lord Haining. His mother was the eldest daughter of Mary Dunbar and Lord Basil Hamilton (sixth son of William Hamilton, Duke of Hamilton and Anne Hamilton, suo jure Duchess of Hamilton).

Murray was educated at Glasgow University in 1742.

== Career ==
Early in 1753, his father, who had represented the Lanark Burghs from 1725 to 1734 and Selkirkshire continuously thereafter, informed Newcastle and Pelham that he intended to stand down at the general election in favour of his son, John, and "received their assurances of neutrality in the event of a contest with Gilbert Elliot." Upon his father's death on 2 July 1753, Murray succeeded as laird of Philiphaugh, however, he faced opposition from another, writing to Newcastle:

"The Duke of Argyll ... I believe will use all his interest here against me by laying his orders upon my own cousin german Mr. Andrew Pringle, sheriff of the county, to join in support of Mr. Elliot against me, contrary to his own intention and inclination."

"As the interest of the Pringles of Haining was a decisive factor, Murray asked that his cousin be allowed a free choice. Argyll's influence, however, prevailed, and at the by-election" on 13 December 1753, Elliot was returned. "Bitterly mortified at losing the county, Murray stood in 1754 for Linlithgow Burghs against Lawrence Dundas, and was returned with the assistance of his cousin Pringle, his kinsman and boon companion Lord March, and eventually of Lord Hyndford and Argyll, after their first choice, Pryse Campbell, had declined. "In 1761, Murray declined the costly burghs contest and declared himself a candidate for the county against Gilbert Elliot. When Andrew Pringle was once more induced out of deference to Argyll to give his interest to Elliot, Murray withdrew but again challenged Elliot in 1762 at his re-election on appointment to office. When Bute intervened on Elliot's behalf, Murray withdrew once more. Murray's attempts on Selkirkshire ceased when in 1765 Elliot transferred to Roxburghshire and was succeeded by John Pringle, Murray's cousin."

"At the general election of 1768, he stood for the Burghs against John Lockhart-Ross, who was returned both for the Burghs and Lanarkshire, but chose to sit for the county. At the ensuing by-election in the burghs, the Hamilton interest proposed a coalition with Murray and his friends, upon condition that they would assist the Hamiltons if 'during the seven years Mr. Murray is provided for, or quits Parliament'. Murray was also approached by Lord Elibank with an offer to buy his interest in the burghs, but admitted he had little to sell."

=== Later life ===
In later life, Murray was in "acute financial distress, caused partly by his own extravagance, and partly by a series of disasters. In April 1768 his magnificent house at Hangingshaw was burned to the ground; he was engaged in land speculation in East Florida and the Isle of St. John, in association with his cousin John Rutherford, receiver general of quit-rents in North Carolina, to whom he had given a bond for £7000. When Rutherford’s schemes failed, his creditors pressed Murray for payment."

Murray travelled to American and "succeeded in recovering a portion of his debt and tried, without success, to obtain an appointment abroad through his cousin John Pringle, who acted as his financial adviser. Forced by his creditors to sell a considerable part of his estates to John Johnstone of Alva, Murray with his wife and family remained in America for some years and as a loyalist suffered further losses. He was back in Scotland by 1784" before settling "with his wife and daughters in Jamaica where he died in 1800."

== Personal life ==
Around 1765, he married N. N. Thomson. Together, they were the parents of at least three sons and four daughters:

- John Murray, of Philiphaugh (d. 1830), who died unmarried and was succeeded in the Murray estates by his brother James.
- Charles Murray, who died unmarried.
- James Murray, of Philiphaugh (1769–1852), who married Mary Dale Hughes, daughter of Henry Hughes, Esq. of Worcester.
- Janet Murray, who married Dennis, Esq. of Jamaica.
- Eleanor Murray, who married Sir James Naesmyth, 3rd Baronet.
- Mary Murray, who married John Macqueen, Esq. of Jamaica.
- Margaret Murray, who married Capt. Baugh of the 58th Regiment.

Murray was known to be "popular, generous, and recklessly extravagant, he belonged to the racing and gambling set."

Murray died on 28 February 1800 in Jamaica.

Parliament of Great Britain
Preceded by James Carmichael	Member of Parliament for Lanark Burghs; 1754–1761	Succeeded by John Lockhart-Ross
