= Powlett Milbank =

British Member of Parliament

Sir Powlett Milbank, Bt JP DL
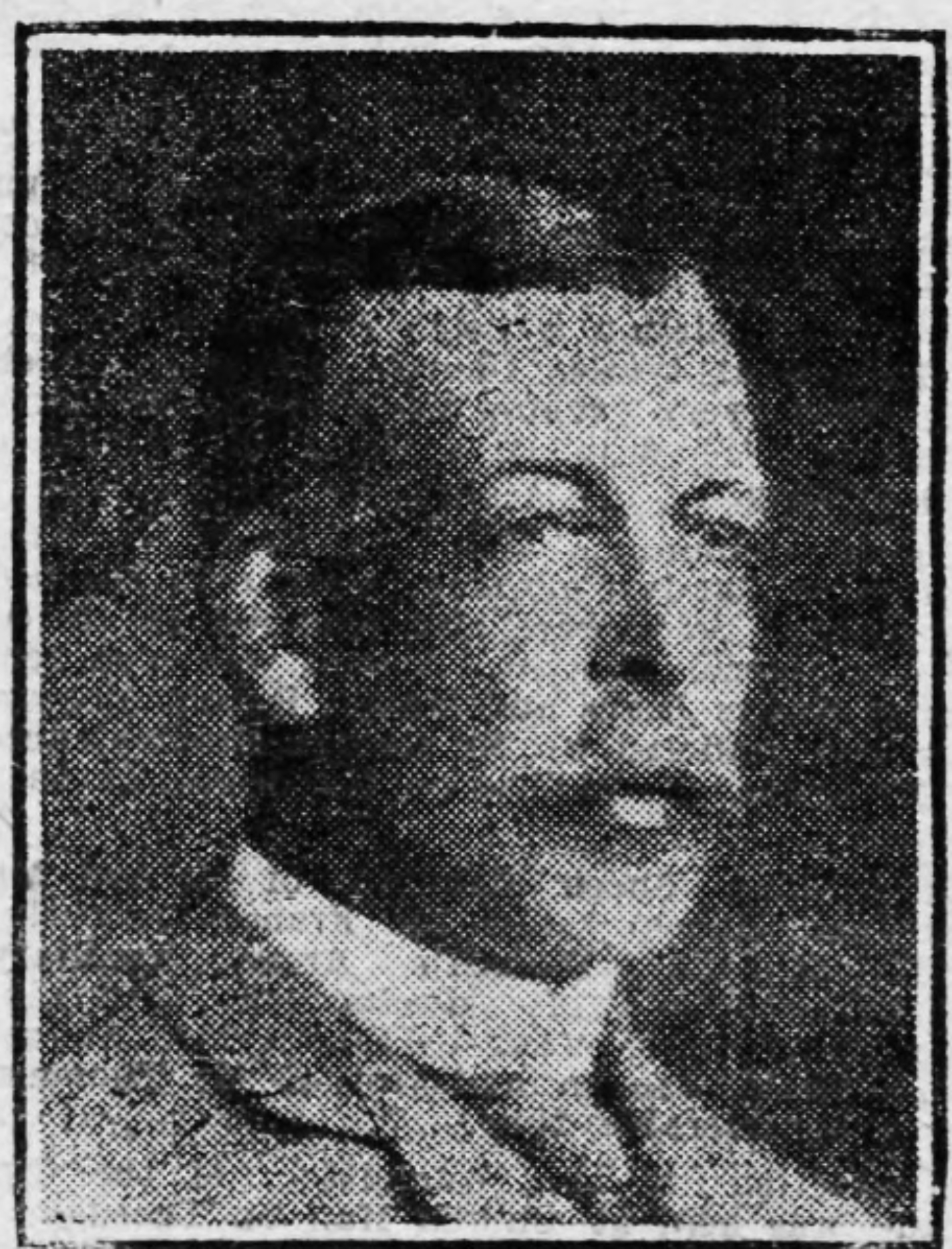

Member of Parliament for Radnorshire
- In office 1895–1900
- Preceded by: Francis Edwards
- Succeeded by: Sir Francis Edwards

Personal details
- Born: Powlett Charles John Milbank; 1 May 1852
- Died: 30 January 1918 (aged 65)
- Party: Conservative
- Spouse: Edith Mary Green-Price (m. 1875; died 1918)
- Relations: Sir Alexander Don, Bt (grandfather); Grace Jane Wallace (grandmother); Mark Milbank (grandfather)
- Children: 4
- Parent(s): Frederick Acclom Milbank; Alexina Harriet Elizabeth Don

Sir Powlett Charles John Milbank, 2nd Baronet JP DL (1 May 1852 – 30 January 1918), was a British Conservative Member of Parliament.

== Early life ==
He was the second, but eldest surviving, son of Sir Frederick Acclom Milbank, 1st Baronet and Alexina Harriet Elizabeth Don. His father was a Liberal MP for North Riding of Yorkshire and Richmond who had been created a baronet, of Well in the County of York, and of Hart in the County of Durham in 1882. His elder brother, William Harry Vane Milbank, predeceased their father without issue in 1892, although he was stepfather to the British painter Count Albert de Belleroche.

His paternal grandparents were Mark Milbank, MP for Camelford, and Lady Augusta Vane (a daughter of the 1st Duke of Cleveland). His maternal grandparents were Sir Alexander Don, 6th Baronet, MP for Roxburghshire, and, his second wife, the former Grace Stein (a daughter of John Stein, MP for Bletchingley who was an Edinburgh banker and distiller). After his grandfather died, his grandmother married Lt.-Gen. Sir James Maxwell Wallace.

== Career ==
Milbank was returned to Parliament for Radnorshire in 1895, a seat he held until 1900. He became Lord Lieutenant of the county in the same year.

Upon the death of his father on 28 April 1898, he succeeded as second Baronet, of Well and Hart. He served as Lord-Lieutenant of Radnorshire, Deputy Lieutenant of Yorkshire, and a Justice of the Peace for Yorkshire.

== Personal life ==
On 3 June 1875, Milbank married Edith Mary Green-Price (d. 1928), a daughter of Sir Richard Green-Price, 1st Baronet and Laura King (a daughter of Dr. Richard Henry King of Mortlake). Together, they were the parents of:

- Aline Laura Milbank (c. 1876–1962), who married Lt.-Col. Francis William Forester of the West Somerset Yeomanry, son of William Henry Forester and Hon. Eleanor Fraser (a granddaughter of the 16th Lord Saltoun), in 1894.
- Sybil May Milbank (c. 1880–1930), who married Lt.-Col. Sir Murrough John Wilson, a son of Col. John Gerald Wilson of Cliffe Hall, in 1904.
- Sir Frederick Richard Powlett Milbank, 3rd Baronet (1881–1964), who married his brother-in-law's sister, Harriet Anne Dorothy Wilson, also a daughter of Col. John Gerald Wilson, in 1904.
- Gladys Mary Milbank (b. 1884), who married Col. Vivian Henry, son of Col. Francis Henry of the Royal Fusiliers, in 1906. After his death in 1929, she married Reginald Akroyd, son of John Bathurst Akroyd, in 1931.

He died in January 1918, aged 65. His widow, Lady Milbank, died on 1 March 1928.

Parliament of the United Kingdom
Preceded by Francis Edwards	Member of Parliament for Radnorshire; 1895–1900	Succeeded by Sir Francis Edwards
Honorary titles
Preceded by The Lord Ormathwaite	Lord Lieutenant of Radnorshire; 1895–1918	Succeeded by Sir Arthur Walsh
Baronetage of the United Kingdom
Preceded by Frederick Acclom Milbank	Baronet (of Well and Hart); 1898–1918	Succeeded by Frederick Richard Powlett Milbank
