= John Murray (died 1753) =

Scottish politician

The Right Honourable John Murray

Member of Parliament for Selkirkshire
- In office 1734–1753
- Preceded by: James Rutherford
- Succeeded by: Gilbert Elliot

Member of Parliament for Lanark Burghs
- In office 1725–1734
- Preceded by: Daniel Weir
- Succeeded by: James Carmichael

Personal details
- Died: 2 July 1753
- Spouse: Eleanor Hamilton (m. 1711)
- Relations: Charles Scott-Murray (grandson); Sir Alexander Don (grandson)
- Children: 6, including John Murray
- Parents: James Murray, Lord Philiphaugh; Margaret Don

John Murray (died 2 July 1753), of Philiphaugh, Selkirk, was a Scottish politician who sat in the House of Commons from 1725 to 1753.

== Early life ==
Murray was the eldest son, of three sons and five daughters, born to the former Margaret Don and Sir James Murray, of Philiphaugh, Selkirk. His sister, Ann Murray, married John Pringle, Lord Haining.

His maternal grandfather was Sir Alexander Don, 1st Baronet, of Newton, Berwick. His paternal grandparents were Sir John Murray of Philiphaugh, MP for Selkirkshire and the former Anne Douglas (daughter of Archibald Douglas, 13th of Cavers).

== Career ==
In 1708, he succeeded his father, becoming the hereditary Sheriff of Selkirk from 1708 until 1734. As head of a celebrated Border family, they owned great estates in Ettrick and Yarrow and acquired their Philiphaugh estates in the fifteenth century.

Murray was returned in a contest as Member of Parliament for Linlithgow Burghs at a by-election on 6 April 1725. He was returned unopposed at the 1727 British general election. At the 1734 British general election he was returned unopposed as MP for Selkirkshire. He was returned unopposed again in 1741. At the 1747 British general election he was opposed, but his opponent died before the poll whereupon an unknown candidate came forward who was defeated.

== Personal life ==
On 31 December 1711, Murray married Eleanor Hamilton (c. 1694–1783), eldest daughter of the former Mary Dunbar and Lord Basil Hamilton (sixth son of William Hamilton, Duke of Hamilton and Anne Hamilton, suo jure Duchess of Hamilton). Together, they were the parents of at least four sons and two daughters:

- Basil Murray (d. 1747), a youth of great promise, who "died in the flower of his age."
- John Murray of Philiphaugh (1726–1800), who married N.N. Thomson.
- David Murray.
- Charles Murray, who married Augusta Eliza Nixon, sister of Robert Scott of Danesfield House.
- Mary Murray, who married Sir Alexander Don, 4th Baronet, of Newton.
- Margaret Murray.

Murray died on 2 July 1753 and was succeeded by his second son, John, as his eldest son had died in 1747. His widow died in December 1783.

=== Descendants ===
Though his son John, he was a grandfather of James Murray, of Philiphaugh and Eleanor Murray (wife of Sir James Naesmyth, 3rd Baronet of Posso).

Though his son Charles, he was a grandfather of Charles Scott-Murray of Danesfield, MP for Buckinghamshire.

Through his daughter Mary, he was a grandfather of Sir Alexander Don, 5th Baronet, of Newton.

Parliament of Great Britain
Preceded by Daniel Weir	Member of Parliament for Lanark Burghs; 1725–1734	Succeeded by James Carmichael
Preceded by James Rutherford	Member of Parliament for Selkirkshire; 1734–1753	Succeeded by Gilbert Elliot
