= John Murray, Lord Bowhill =

Scottish lawyer and politician

John Murray (c. 1667 – 24 March 1714) was a Scottish lawyer and politician.

He was a Commissioner to the Parliament of Scotland for Selkirk from 1689 to 1702 and for Selkirkshire from 1702 until the Act of Union 1707. He was one of the Scottish representatives to the first Parliament of Great Britain, but may not have taken his seat as he was appointed a Lord of Session as Lord Bowhill on 7 June 1707.

== Family ==
He is the second son of John Murray and Anne Douglas, and a brother of James Murray, Lord Philiphaugh. By his mother, he is a first cousin of Archibald Douglas, 13th of Cavers. He is also the grandfather of James Murray.

Parliament of Scotland
Preceded by William Waugh	Burgh Commissioner for Selkirk; 1689–1702	Succeeded by Robert Scott
Preceded by James Pringle; Sir Francis Scott	Shire Commissioner for Selkirk; 1702–1707; With: John Pringle	Succeeded by Parliament of Great Britain
Parliament of Great Britain
Preceded by Parliament of Scotland	Member of Parliament for Scotland; 1707–1708; With: 44 others	Succeeded by John Pringle (as MP for Selkirkshire)
