= Sir William Don, 7th Baronet =

British baronet and actor

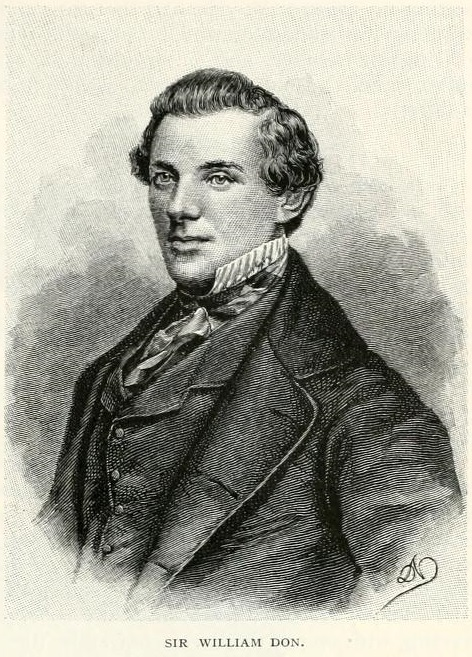

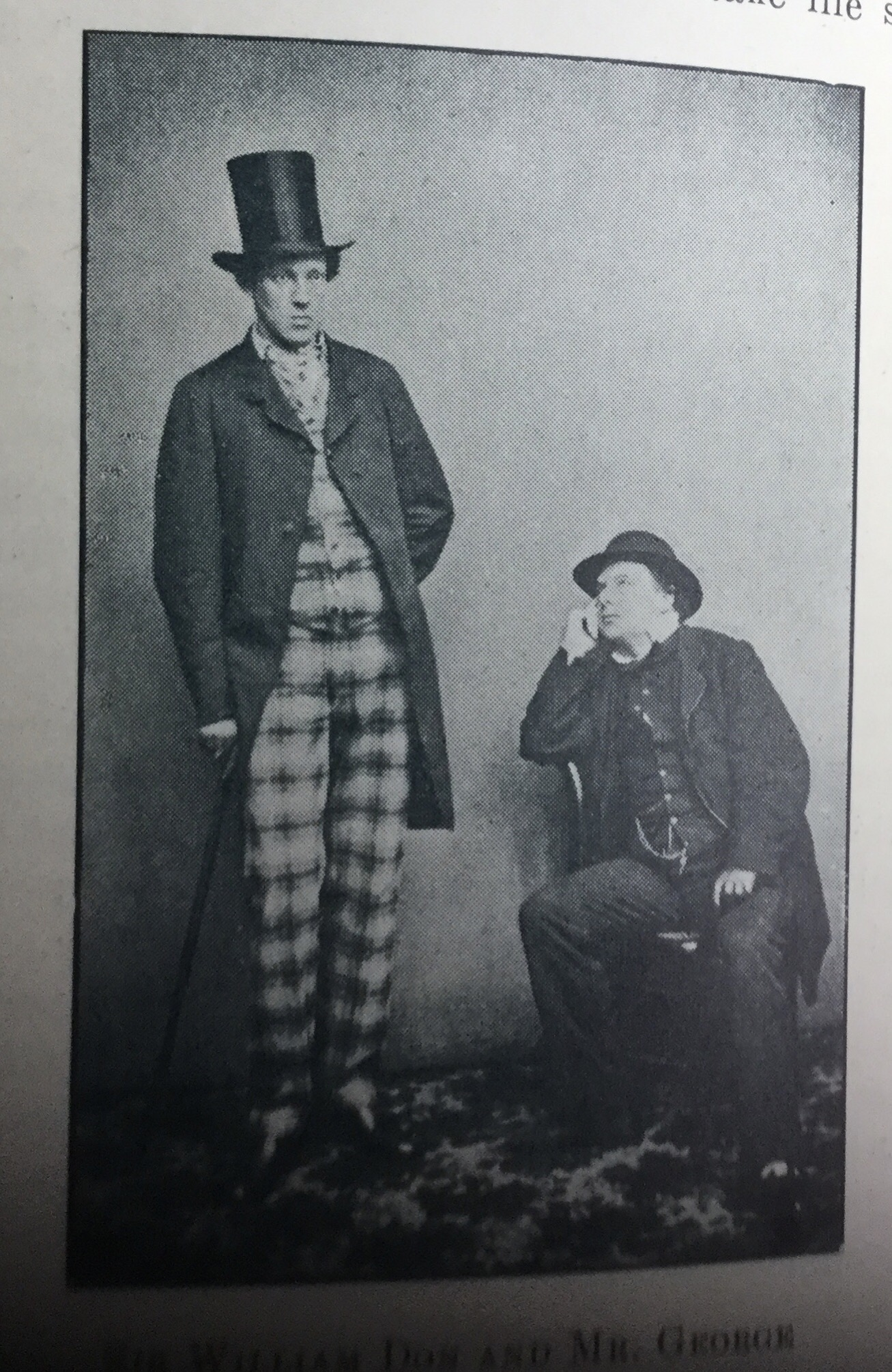
Sir William Don and fellow actor and impresario George Coppin in Australia

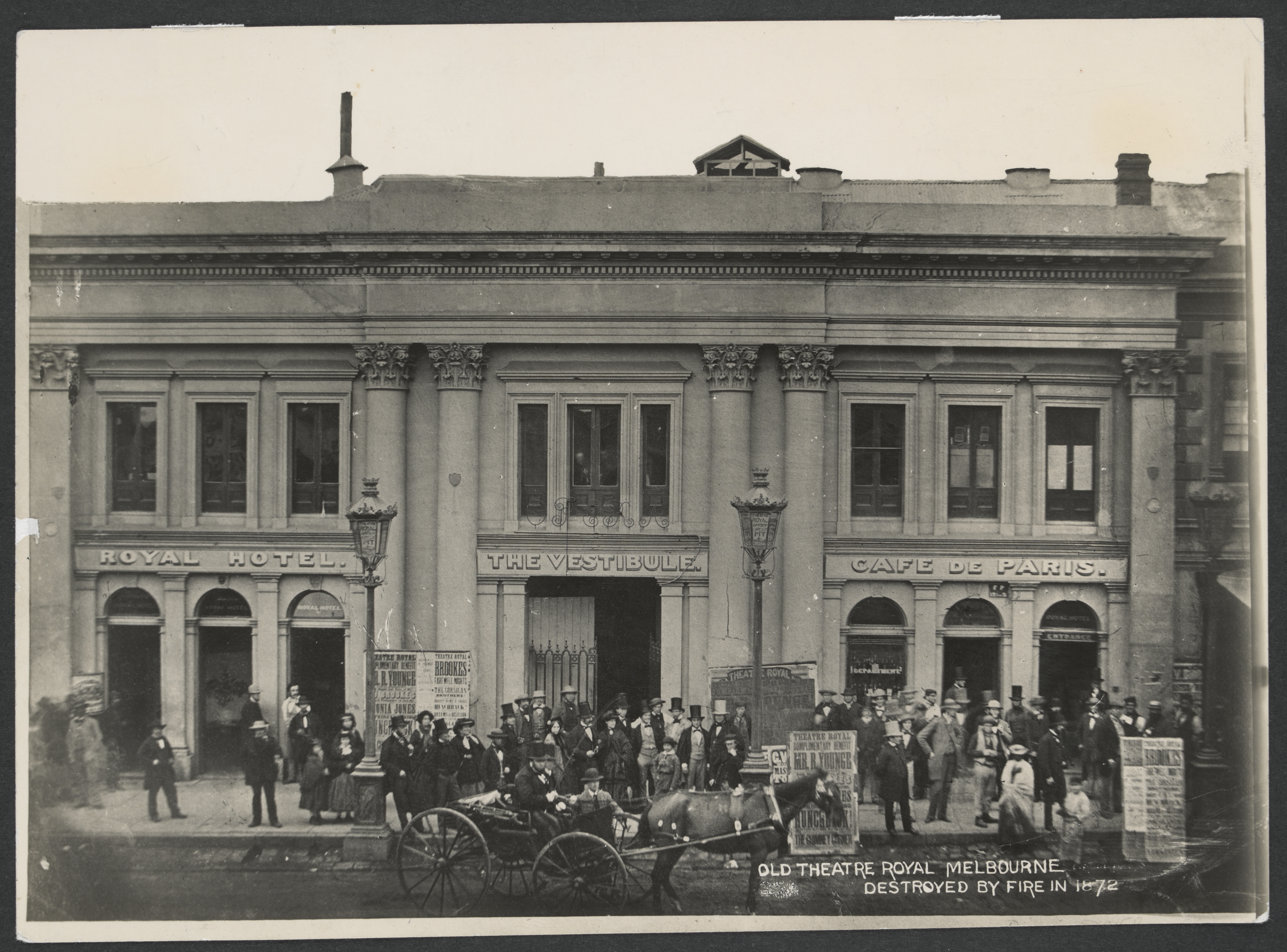
Theatre Royal, Melbourne

Sir William Henry Don, 7th Baronet (4 May 1825 – 19 March 1862) was a British baronet and actor.

== Early life ==
Don was born on 4 May 1825. He was the son of Grace Jane Stein (1802-1878), a daughter of Edinburgh banker and distiller John Stein, and Sir Alexander Don, 6th Baronet of Newtondon, Kelso, Scottish Borders, "the model of a cavalier in all courteous and elegant accomplishments", was an intimate friend of Sir Walter Scott, and one of the most constant attendants at his social dinner parties. He sat for Roxburghshire 1814–18, 1818–20, and from 1820 until his death. His mother married as her second husband Sir James Maxwell Wallace of Ainderby Hall, near Northallerton.

His father, who was twenty-two years older than his mother, died on 11 April 1826, aged 47, when William was less than a year old after which he succeeded as 7th baronet. William was educated at Eton between 1838 and 1841. On 28–30 Aug. 1839 he took part in the Eglinton Tournament in the character of a page to Lady Montgomerie.

== Career ==
Don entered the British Army as a cornet in the 5th Dragoon Guards 3 June 1842, was an extra aide-de-camp to the Lord-Lieutenant of Ireland, 1844, Lieutenant in the 5th Dragoon Guards, 1845, and retired from the Army 28 November 1845 deep in debt. The fine estate called Newtondon, left him by his father, had to be sold, and produced £85,000, which went to his creditors.

=== Acting career ===
Don was then compelled to turn to account the experience which he had acquired as an amateur actor, and after a short starring engagement in the north of England, he went to America, where he made his first public appearance as "John Duck" in the Jacobite at the [Old] Broadway Theatre, New York, on 27 October 1850. Nathaniel Parker Willis, who shortly afterwards saw him in the character of Sir Charles Coldstream in the comedy of Used Up, gives a very favourable opinion of his acting in the character of a gentleman.

Don remained in America for nearly five years, playing with success in New York, Philadelphia, and other large towns, and on his return to England found that after all his affairs had been wound up he was still in debt about £7,000. To endeavour to pay off this sum he continued the profession of a comedian. He commenced in Edinburgh and Glasgow, and after a provincial tour came to the Haymarket Theatre, London, where in 1857 he acted in a piece called Whitebait at Greenwich.

In 1861 he went to Australia. At this period he had taken to playing female characters in burlesques, and he appeared at the Theatre Royal, Melbourne, in Valentine and Orson and in a travestie in The Colleen Bawn called "Eily O'Connor". In February 1862 he visited Hobart Town, Tasmania, with a company of his own, where he fell ill. On 15 March 1862, he played Queen Elizabeth in the burlesque of Kenilworth, and four days later he died from aneurysm of the aorta at Webb's Hotel, Hobart Town. He possessed a fine sense of humour, a quick perception of the ludicrous side of life and character, a remarkable talent for mimicry, a strong nerve, a ready wit, and great self-possession.

There is a pub on Elizabeth Street in Hobart named after him. It is now the headquarters for iOS software company, Procreate.

== Personal life ==
Don's first marriage was in June 1847 to Antonia Lebrun, a daughter of M. Lebrun of Hamburg; and his second marriage was on 17 October 1857, at Marylebone, to Emily Eliza Saunders, eldest daughter of John Saunders of the Adelphi Theatre, London. Miss Saunders had been well known as a lively actress in comedy and farce at the Adelphi, the Haymarket, the Surrey, and other theatres, for some years before her marriage to Don.

Returning to England after her husband's death, she resumed her professional career, but with no very profitable result, though she had been very popular in the Australian colonies and in New Zealand.

In 1867 she went to the United States, where she made her appearance on 18 February at the New York Theatre in Peggy Green and the burlesque of Kenilworth, and on the close of the season returned to her native country. She was for a short period lessee of the Theatre Royal, Nottingham, and assisted at the opening of the Gaiety Theatre, Edinburgh. Latterly she was in reduced circumstances and was obliged to appear as a vocalist in music halls. She died at Edinburgh 20 September 1875.

== See also ==
- Lady Don, by which name his second wife was known, particularly in Australia.

== Notes ==
Baronetage of Nova Scotia
Preceded by Alexander Don	Baronet (of Newton); 1826–1862	Succeeded by John Don-Wauchope
