= Jack Murray =

Jack Murray may refer to:

- Jack Murray (Australian footballer) (born 1913), Australian rules footballer
- John Murray (Victorian politician) (1851–1916), Australian politician
- John W. Murray (died 1996), American pastor, evangelist, and educator
- Jack Murray (film editor) (1900–1961), American film editor
- Jack Murray (cricketer) (1892–1974), Australian cricketer
- Jack Murray (racing driver) (1907–1983), "Gelignite Jack", Australian rally driver
- Jack Keith Murray (1889–1979), administrator of the Australian Territories of Papua and New Guinea

== See also ==
- John Murray
