= Mark Pringle (politician) =

British Member of Parliament (1754–1812)

Dr Mark Pringle of Haining and Clifton FRSE (1754–1812) was a Scottish landowner and advocate who was MP for Selkirkshire from 1786 to 1802.

== Life ==
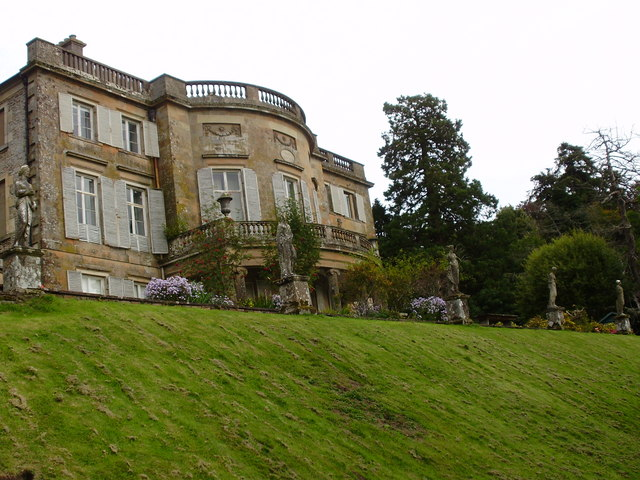
Haining House near Selkirk

He was born on 10 January 1754 the son of John Pringle MP of Crichton, Midlothian, and his wife, Anne Rutherford of Fairnielee near Selkirk. He was educated at the High School in Edinburgh. In 1769 he was sent to London to train as a lawyer at the Inner Temple. In 1771 he received a place to study Law at Cambridge University. He passed the Bar and became an advocate in 1777.

In 1782 he became Deputy Judge Advocate for Selkirkshire. In 1783 he was a founder of the Royal Society of Edinburgh.

In 1786, on the death of his father, he succeeded him as MP for Selkirkshire. He also took on his father's role as Receiver of Crown Rents for Selkirkshire.

In 1794 he began building The Haining on the site of Selkirk Castle on the south side of a small loch.

He died on 25 April 1812 at The Haining.

== Family ==
In 1795 he married Ann Elizabeth Chalmers.

His son John Pringle (b. 1795) commissioned Archibald Elliot to remodel The Haining in 1819/20.
