= Jon Murray =

Jon or Jonathan Murray may refer to:

- Jon Murray (coach), American cross country coach
- Jon Garth Murray (1954–1995), American atheist activist
- Jonathan Murray (born 1955), American television producer
- Jonathan Murray House
- Jon Murray, of the comedy duo Stuckey and Murray
- Jonny Murray, Canadian ice hockey linesman

== See also ==
- John Murray
