= Selkirkshire (Parliament of Scotland constituency) =

Before the Acts of Union 1707, the barons of the shire of Selkirk (also called Ettrick Forest) elected commissioners to represent them in the unicameral Parliament of Scotland and in the Convention of the Estates.

From 1708 Selkirkshire was represented by one Member of Parliament in the House of Commons of Great Britain.

== List of shire commissioners ==
- 1607: Sir Robert Scott of Thirlestane
- 1612: Sir Gideon Murray of Elibank
- 1612: Sir John Murray of Philiphaugh and Falahill
- 1617: Sir Patrick Murray of Elibank, 1st Baronet
- 1617, 1621: George Pringle of Torwoodlee
- 1621, 1630: Sir James Pringle of Galashiels
- 1633: Sir James Murray of Philiphaugh and Falahill
- 1633: James Pringle of Whytbank
- 1639–40: Andrew Riddell of Haining
- 1639–41, 1643: Robert Scott of Whitslade
- 1641, 1645: James Pringle of Torwoodlee
- 1641, 1643–44, 1644–46: Sir William Scott of Harden
- 1644–45: Robert Scott of Hartwoodmyres
- 1645–47, 1650–51: Sir Walter Scott of Whitslade
- 1646–47, 1648–49: Colonel Walter Scott of Hartwoodburn
- 1648–49: Patrick Scott of Thirlestane
- 1650: Sir William Scott of Harden
- 1661: Sir John Murray of Philiphaugh
- 1661–63: Thomas Scott of Whitslade
- 1665 convention: John Riddell of Haining
- 1665 convention, 1667 convention, 1669–74: Patrick Murray of Deuchar
- 1667 convention: William Scott of Hartwoodmyres
- 1669–74, 1685–86, 1693–1701: Sir Francis Scott of Thirlestane
- 1678: John Riddell of Haining
- 1678 convention, 1681–82: James Murray of Philiphaugh
- 1681–82: Hugh Scott of Galashiels
- 1685–86: Sir William Hay of Drumelzier, privy counsellor
- 1689–90: Sir William Scott the younger of Harden (expelled 1693)
- 1689: George Pringle of Torwoodlee (died 1689)
- 1693–1701: James Pringle of Torwoodlee
- 1702: Sir James Murray of Philiphaugh; elected for Selkirkshire but sat instead as Lord Clerk Register
- 1702–07: John Murray of Bowhill
- 1703–07: John Pringle of Haining (replacing Philiphaugh)

== See also ==
- List of constituencies in the Parliament of Scotland at the time of the Union
