= Lady Don =

English singer and actor

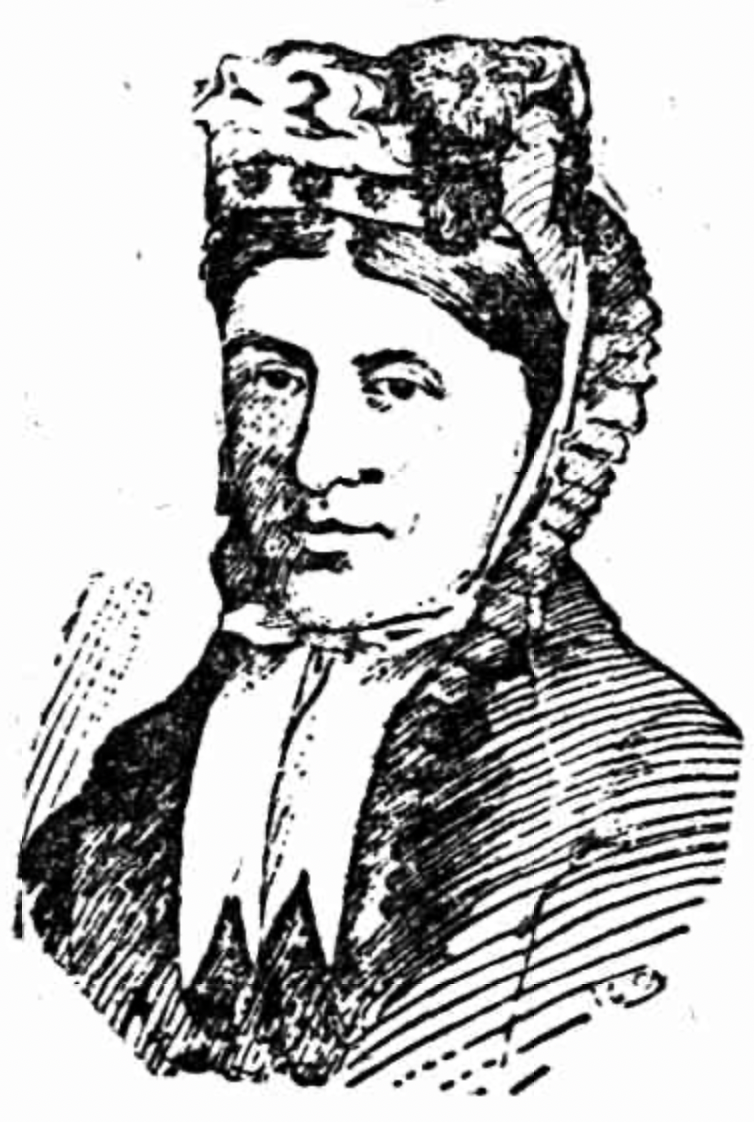
- Born: c. 1830; England
- Died: 1875; Edinburgh, Scotland
- Other name: Emilia Eliza Saunders
- Occupations: Singer, actress
- Years active: c. 1850s–1875
- Spouse: Sir William Don (m. 1857; died 1862)
- Children: Harriette Grace Mary Don
- Father: John Saunders

Lady Don, born Emilia Eliza "Emily" Saunders (c. 1830 – 29 September 1875) was an English singer and actress who enjoyed great popularity in Australia.

== Early life ==
The eldest daughter of John Saunders, a London actor, Saunders was attracted to the stage at an early age, becoming popular on account of her beautiful singing voice.

== Marriage ==
On 17 October 1857 she married, at Marylebone, Sir William Don, a widowed baronet of little means but outstanding personality. He was a professional actor, and they often appeared together at the Theatre Royal, Newcastle. They were notable in Kenilworth, a burlesque based on Wallter Scott's novel, in which Lady Don played Leicester and Sir William played Queen Elizabeth, to great effect, accentuated no doubt by Sir Don's extraordinary height of 6 feet 7 inches (2.0 m).

== First Australian tour (1860–1862) ==
The couple sailed to Australia aboard Blue Jacket, arriving in Melbourne on 16 December 1860. They opened at the Theatre Royal on 21 January 1861 as Josephine in The Daughter of the Regiment (billed as The Child of the Regiment). The operetta was well received, and Lady Don was applauded by audience and critics alike, while her husband's eccentric performance in the accompanying farce was greeted enthusiastically. On Burns Night they played Guy Mannering to a crowded house, with Lady Don as Julia Mannering and Sir William as Dandie Dinmont.

They left Melbourne at the end of March 1861, (Note: At this stage their party consisted of Sir William, Lady Don, their little daughter, a nursemaid, a lady's maid, W. H. Ford and Ford's son Tommy.) playing Sydney from April to June, with Geelong, Ballarat and Bendigo and other gold rush towns from July to October. They returned to the Theatre Royal, Melbourne for a second season November 1861 to January 1862. On 24 February they opened at the Theatre Royal, Hobart, and it was at Webb's Hotel, Murray Street in that town that Sir William Don died on 19 March 1862 at age 37. He had been suffering lung problems but died of an aortic aneurysm and was buried privately at St David's cemetery in Davey Street. Lady Don fulfilled her immediate obligations but refused further engagements. She left with her daughter for England by the Lincolnshire on 26 May 1862 first having her husband's coffin exhumed and despatched to London aboard the Harrowby. (Note: The coffin would have been quite heavy, as it consisted of three layers, the second being of sheet lead and the outer of stout kauri.)

== Return to England and second Australian tour (1864–1866) ==
In England Lady Don and her daughter lived with Sir William's family but had no income and was unable by circumstances to appear on stage, so she was anxious to return to Australia where she was certain of making a living. She sailed on the Suffolk, reaching Melbourne on 25 May 1864 and made her first appearance on 6 August 1864, at the Haymarket, reopening the theatre under a new lessee, Hoskins, again as Josephine in The Child of the Regiment to tremendous applause. She played in Sydney from January to March 1865, by which time she was managed by Henry D. Wilton, and her performances were supported by the Howson Family Troupe (Frank, Emma and Clelia). She went on to play Brisbane (March–April), Tasmania (April–May), Adelaide (June–August) and Melbourne (September–November). They played Sydney from December 1865 to January 1866, then crossed the Tasman Sea to New Zealand from February to May 1866.

== United States (1866–1868) ==
She arrived in California in July 1866, and toured America, at first sharing the bill with the Howson Family Troupe, until adispute arose, details as yet not found, and Frank Howson sen. (1818–1869) vowed he would never share a stage with her again. Her last American engagement was at the Howard Athenaeum, Boston, in March 1868.

== Later career and death ==
Returning to Britain, her first engagement was at the Tyne Theatre, Newcastle upon Tyne, on 13 April 1868, playing Josephine in The Daughter of the Regiment, but she lost her voice, she said, to a cold; her efforts were greeted with sympathetic cheers. From June 1870 she was lessee of the Theatre Royal, Nottingham,with Clarence Holt as her stage manager, but had to quit after eight months due to declining health and heavy losses; a meeting of her creditors in 1871 found debts of some £1,200–1,300 and no assets apart from her wardrobe. She helped open the Gaiety Theatre, Edinburgh, but was not in good health and finished her working life on the music hall stage.

She died on 29 September 1875 of "rapid consumption". After learning of her death, the Ovens and Murray Advertiser described her:

She was a thoroughly conscientious actress, and neglected no means of making her characters representative. As a ballad-singer, in a certain line, she had no rival. She entered with all her soul into the spirit of what she had to do. She was an elegant, dashing, handsome woman, who could not be other than popular, and when she again left Australia, everybody hoped she would soon return again. For some time in England, her career was a tolerably prosperous one. She never had any position in London, but in the provinces she held her own very well. . . We remember her as the bright piquant comedienne to whom we are indebted for many a pleasant hour of enjoyment, and she will always be associated with some of our most agreeable memories of the Melbourne stage. . . When Sir William Don married her, it was regarded by his friends as a fatal mesalliance, but it turned out for him an excellent investment, looking at it only from a financial point of view, for although he was himself a very good actor, his profitable engagements were rendered much more certain in association with his wife.

== Legacy and influence ==
1861 - The Lady Don Valse was dedicated to Lady Don by a Mr. John Winterbottom, and published by Mr. J. R. Clarke, of George-street, Sydney.

1865 - 'THALIA'S MISSION.' a Impromtu appeared in the South Australian Register dedicated to Lady Don.

The National Portrait Gallery in London holds an 1863 albumen carte-de-visite, Popular Actresses, in which she appears.

== Family ==
A daughter, Harriette Grace Mary Don, married John Satterfield Sandars.

== See also ==
- List of entertainers who married titled Britons
