= John Murray (geographer) =

Scottish geographer and educator

Dr John Murray FRSE (1883–1940) was a Scottish geographer and educator.

== Life ==
He was born in New Pitsligo in Aberdeenshire in 1883. He studied at Aberdeen University graduating MA. His career began as an English teacher at Perth Academy. He then moved to teach English at Dumfries Academy;

In the First World War he served as an instructor at the Royal Garrison Artillery, instructing in Musketry and lecturing in War Aims and Military History. After the war he became Rector of Annan Academy.

In 1933 he was elected a Fellow of the Royal Society of Edinburgh. His proposers were James Drever, Shepherd Dawson, Alexander Watters and Sir Godfrey Thomson.

He died in Annan on 13 November 1940.

== Publications ==
- A Practical Geography of Dumfriesshire (1921)
- The World (1926)
- New Method Arithmetics (1941)
