= Alexander Pringle (politician) =

Scottish Conservative politician

Alexander Pringle (30 January 1791 – 2 September 1857) was a Scottish Conservative politician. He was Member of Parliament for Selkirkshire from 1830 to 1832 and again from 1835 to 1846. He was made a Lord of the Treasury in Peel's second ministry, but resigned in 1845 in protest at the decision to enhance the Maynooth Grant. After retiring from parliament he served as Principal Keeper of Sasines until his death.

Political offices
Preceded by Thomas Wyse; Henry Tufnell; Edward Horsman Grant Pringle; William Francis Cowper	Junior Lord of the Treasury; 1841–1845	Succeeded by William Forbes Mackenzie
Parliament of the United Kingdom
Preceded by William Eliott-Lockhart	Member of Parliament for Selkirkshire; 1830–1832	Succeeded by Robert Pringle
Preceded by Robert Pringle	Member of Parliament for Selkirkshire; 1835–1846	Succeeded by Allan Eliott-Lockhart
