= John Pringle (Selkirkshire MP, died 1792) =

John Pringle (c. 1716–1792), was a Scottish merchant and politician who sat in the House of Commons between 1765 and 1786.

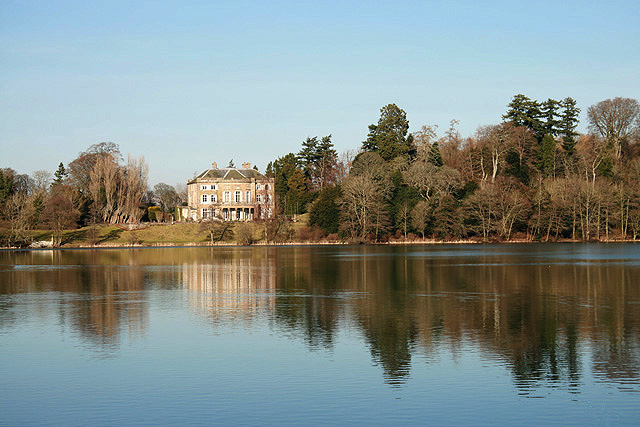
The Haining

Pringle was the son of John Pringle MP, of The Haining, and Anne Murray, daughter of Sir James Murray, MP of Philiphaugh. When he was young, Pringle went to Madeira and made a fortune in the wine trade. His father died in 1754, and he purchased the family estate of Haining from his elder brother Andrew. After he came back from Madeira he split his time between his property in Scotland and his business interests in the firm of Scott and Pringle of Threadneedle Street, London.

Pringle possessed a family interest in the county and burgh of Selkirk and was returned as Member of Parliament for Selkirkshire in June 1765. He was described as a kindly and generous man, beloved by his kinsmen and constituents, whom he advised and assisted in their financial affairs. They returned him unopposed for over 20 years.

Pringle died on 27 July 1792.

He was father to Mark Pringle of Haining and Clifton.

Parliament of Great Britain
Preceded by Gilbert Elliot	Member of Parliament for Selkirkshire; 1765–1786	Succeeded by Mark Pringle
