= Allan Eliott-Lockhart =

British politician

Member of Parliament for Selkirkshire
- In office 12 February 1846 – 1 August 1861
- Preceded by: Alexander Pringle
- Succeeded by: Henry Douglas-Scott-Montagu

Personal details
- Born: 24 January 1803
- Died: 15 March 1878 (aged 75)
- Party: Conservative

Allan Eliott-Lockhart (24 January 1803 – 15 March 1878) was a British Conservative politician.

Eliott-Lockhart was elected Conservative MP for Selkirkshire at a by-election in 1846—caused by the resignation of Alexander Pringle who had been appointed Clerk of Sasines—and held the seat until 1861, when he resigned by accepting the office of Steward of the Chiltern Hundreds.

Parliament of the United Kingdom
Preceded by Alexander Pringle	Member of Parliament for Selkirkshire; 1846–1861	Succeeded by Henry Douglas-Scott-Montagu
