= Joseph Naper =

American politician

- Joseph Naper town founder of Naperville, Illinois, circa 1850s–1860s
- Born: 1798; Bennington, Vermont
- Died: August 23, 1862 (aged 63-64); Naperville, Illinois
- Resting place: Naperville Cemetery, Naperville, Illinois
- Occupations: ship captain; shipbuilder; surveyor; businessman; state militia officer; soldier; politician; city planner
- Known for: being the promoter and co-founder of Naper's Settlement in 1831, the oldest frontier Illinois town
- Relatives: John Murray (brother-in-law)

Joseph Naper (1798–1862) was an early Illinois pioneer, ship captain, shipbuilder, businessman, surveyor, state militia officer, soldier, politician, and city planner. In 1831, Naper and his brother John were credited with founding Naper's Settlement. Besides Galena, Illinois (1827) and Dixon, Illinois (1830), Naper's Settlement was one of the oldest Illinois communities to be established west of Fort Dearborn, now Chicago. Naper's Settlement would be renamed Naperville, becoming the oldest town and first county seat of DuPage County, Illinois, later moved by county vote in 1868 and displaced by Wheaton.

== Early life ==
Joseph Naper was born in Bennington, Vermont, and traveled west with his parents during his youth to Ashtabula, Ohio, where he learned to be a ship builder from his father, Robert Naper, of Alwyn, Scotland. In 1809, Joseph Naper's sister Amy Naper married John Murray of Ashtabula, Ohio, who would later become one of the founding settlers of Naperville, Illinois. The Naper family shipped traded goods on the Great Lakes, frequently stopping at Fort Dearborn on Lake Michigan. On an early trip, Naper acquired lots near the fort, as did many of the first settlers to reach the Chicago River port.

== Town builder and politician ==
On a later trip in 1831, on the Telegraph, a ship built by Joseph Naper, he was joined by his brother John Naper. The Naper families and five other families settled in the area, first known as Naper's Settlement, which later would become a part of DuPage County. Joseph Naper platted the town of Naperville, surveying the property and was elected to the Illinois House of Representatives for the first time in 1836. Here, Naper laid the groundwork and supervised passage of the 1839 bill which separated DuPage County from Cook County. Joseph Naper also served on the same committee with Abraham Lincoln, then a newly elected legislator from the Springfield area.

== Military service ==
Joseph Naper served as an Illinois Militia captain in the Black Hawk War of 1832 and was one of the many DuPage County men who served in the Mexican War of 1846.

== Businessman and village president ==
In the 1850s, Joseph Naper was one of the founding stockholders for the short-lived "Southwest Plank Road", now Ogden Avenue/U.S. Route 34, which improved transportation between Aurora, Illinois, and Chicago. Another major plank road stockholder was Colonel Julius M. Warren of nearby Warrenville. Joseph Naper returned to the Illinois General Assembly in 1852. His aggressive actions again provided a means for establishing new communities within the state of Illinois. In 1857, Naper became the first village president of Naperville. As many early settlers had done, Naper engaged in a number of trades and businesses as he helped to develop Naperville and Dupage County.

== Death ==
On August 23, 1862, Joseph Naper died in Naperville, Illinois and was buried in Naperville Cemetery.

== Sources ==
- Richmond, C.W. and H. F. Valletta. A history of the county of DuPage, Illinois. Chicago: 1857.
- Richmond, C.W. History of DuPage County, Illinois, Aurora, IL: Knickerbocker & Hodder, 1877.
- Blanchard, Rufus. History of DuPage County, Illinois. Chicago: O.L. Baskin & Company, 1882.
- DuPage Roots. Wheaton, IL: Du Page County Historical Society, 1985.
- Gingold, Katharine Kendzy (2007). Ruth by Lake and Prairie; True Stories of Early Naperville. Gnu Ventures Company. ISBN 978-0-9792419-0-1.
- Williams, William W. (1878). History of Ashtabula Co., Ohio. William Bros.
- Anonymous (1894). Portrait and Biographical Record of Cook and DuPage Counties. Lake City Publishing Company.
- Naperville, Illinois History Page
- A photograph of Capt. Naper
