= John Stein (MP) =

Scottish banker, distiller and politician

John Stein (13 September 1769 – 1814) was a Scottish banker, distiller and politician.

== Early life ==
Stein was born on 13 September 1769 in Clackmannan, Scotland. He was the son of James Stein of Kilbagie (1740–1804), and Katharine (née Buchanan) Stein (1750–1828), a daughter of John Buchanan of Alloa, Clackmannan. His sister, Anne Stein, married Gen. Sir Alexander Duff (parents of James Duff, 5th Earl Fife and George Skene Duff). His father, who died in Riga in 1804, ran a distillery at Kennetpans, in partnership with his uncles, John and Robert Stein, which was ruined by legislation in 1788 which excluded it from the London market.

== Career ==
In 1796, Stein was returned to Parliament as a guest of Sir Robert Clayton, who usually returned Whigs. There is no record of a speech by him in the House and he did not seek re-election in 1802.

Stein obtained an exclusive licence to establish a porter brewery in St. Petersburg, which deprived Barclay, Perkins & Co. of Southwark of a "lively trade."

== Personal life ==
On 29 January 1802, Stein was married to Grace Bushby (1783–1822), a daughter of John Bushby of Tinwald Downs, Dumfries, and Grizzel (née Maitland) Bushby. In Edinburgh, they lived at 37 Heriot Row. Together, they were the parents of:

- James Stein (1802–1877), who married Janet Beattie in 1825.
- Grace Jane Stein (1804–1878), who married, as his second wife, Sir Alexander Don, 6th Baronet, MP for Roxburghshire, in 1824. After his death in 1826, she married Lt.-Gen. Sir James Maxwell Wallace.
- Katherine Mary Stein (1813–1873), who married George Lane-Fox of Bowcliffe Hall, High Sheriff of Leitrim, a son of George Lane-Fox, MP for Beverley.

Stein died in 1814 in Edinburgh.

=== Descendants ===
Through his daughter Grace, he was a grandfather of Sir William Henry Don, 7th Baronet, the actor, and Alexina Harriet Don (wife of Sir Frederick Milbank, 1st Baronet, son of Mark Milbank, MP for Camelford, and a grandson the 1st Duke of Cleveland).

Through his youngest daughter Katherine, he was a great-grandfather of George Lane-Fox, 1st Baron Bingley.

Parliament of Great Britain
Preceded by Philip Francis; Sir Robert Clayton	Member of Parliament for Bletchingley; 1796–1802; With: Sir Lionel Copley, Bt 1796–1797; Benjamin Hobhouse 1797–1802	Succeeded by James Milnes; John Benn Walsh
