= James Rutherford (MP) =

Scottish politician

James Rutherford (died 1747) of Bowland, Midlothian was a Scottish politician who sat in the House of Commons from 1730 to 1733.

Rutherford was the only son of Robert Rutherford of Bowland and his wife Anne Murray, daughter of Sir John Murray of Philiphaugh. He married Isabella Sharplaw, daughter of John Sharplaw of Roxburgh.

Rutherford succeeded his cousin, John Pringle, as Member of Parliament for Selkirkshire at a by-election on 13 February 1730. He voted consistently with the Administration. In 1733 he was appointed Commissary of Peebles 1733. He did not stand at the 1734 British general election.

Rutherford died in August 1747, leaving one son.

Parliament of Great Britain
Preceded by John Pringle I	Member of Parliament for Selkirkshire; 1730–1734	Succeeded by John Murray
