= Robert Pringle (MP) =

British Army officer (1798–1842)

Robert Pringle (1798 – 15 December 1842) was a British Army officer and politician.

Pringle lived at Clifton Park in Roxburghshire. He served in 7th Queen's Own Hussars in the British Army, becoming a captain. At the 1832 UK general election, he stood as a Whig in Selkirkshire. He won the seat, becoming the fifth generation of his family to represent the county. In Parliament, he argued against monopolies and sinecures. He stood for re-election at the 1835 UK general election, but was defeated, and failed to regain the seat at the 1837 UK general election.

Parliament of the United Kingdom
Preceded by Alexander Pringle	Member of Parliament for Selkirkshire; 1832–1835	Succeeded by Alexander Pringle
