= John Pringle, Lord Haining =

Scottish lawyer, politician, and judge

John Pringle, Lord Haining (c. 1674 – 19 August 1754) was a Scottish lawyer, politician, and judge. His ownership of a large estate near Selkirk secured him a seat in the Parliament of Scotland from 1702 until the Act of Union in 1707, and then in the House of Commons of Great Britain from 1707 until he became a Lord of Session in 1729.

== Early life ==
Pringle was the second son of Andrew Pringle of Clifton in the Scottish Borders. His mother Violet was a daughter of John Rutherford of Edgerston, Roxburgh. Andrew Pringle had forced the marriage of his oldest son Robert to Andrew's niece Janet Pringle, thereby reuniting Pringle lands which had been divided in a previous generation. This wealth allowed Andrew to educate John at the University of Edinburgh, where he graduated with an MA in 1692, and at Utrecht where he graduated in 1696. He was admitted to the Faculty of Advocates in 1698.

== Career ==
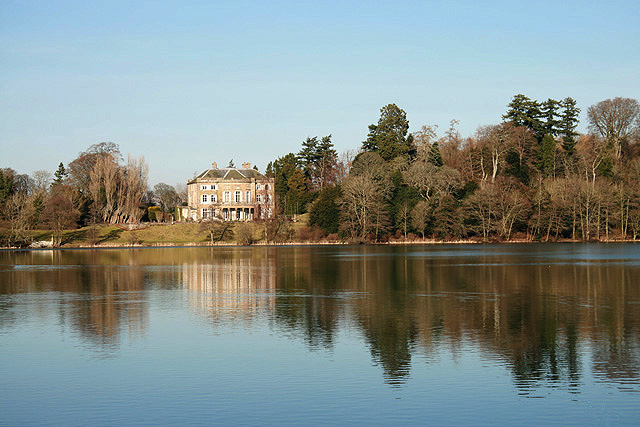
The Haining

Pringle soon established a successful legal practice, and in 1701 or 1702 his father purchased for him The Haining estate at a cost of £3,412 (£699,000 in 2023). This large estate, beside the town of Selkirk gave him a strong influence on the politics both of the shire of Selkirkshire and burgh of Selkirk. Due to the support of his future father-in-law, the hereditary sheriff of Selkirkshire Sir James Murray, Pringle was elected to Parliament in 1702 as a shire commissioner for Selkirkshire.

After the Union with England, Pringle was rewarded for his support of the union by appointment as one of the 45 Scottish representatives to the first Parliament of Great Britain. At the first post-union election in 1708, Pringle was elected unopposed to the House of Commons of Great Britain as the Member of Parliament (MP) for Selkirkshire. His election was secured with the support of Sir James's son John Murray, who had succeeded his father in 1708. This alliance with the Murrays (and their patron the Duke of Queensberry) defined Pringles's political career. In 1713 he married Ann Murray, daughter of Sir James Murray and brother of John, with a dowry of 18,000 merks.

As a reward for supporting the Earl of Oxford, Pringle was appointed in 1711 as joint Keeper of the Signet for Scotland with William Cochrane, a post worth about 30,000 merks per annum to its holder. Pringle had to relinquish this lucrative office in 1713, when the Earl of Mar was appointed as Secretary of State for Scotland, and the office of Keeper was reunited with the Secretaryship.

In 1714, Pringle was one of the 'gentlemen of quality' who endorsed the Privy Council's proclamation of George I as the new king. Thereafter, Pringle consistently voted with the Tories in support of the administration, but hankered for appointment to the Court of Session. When a vacancy arose in 1725, his case was pressed unsuccessfully by John Scrope, the Secretary to the Treasury. However, in 1729, after the death of Lord Pencaitland, Pringle was appointed as a Lord of Session under the title of Lord Haining. In Edinburgh he lived on the west side of the old Scottish mint adjacent to William Cullen's house.

== Death ==
Pringle died in Edinburgh on 19 August 1754, "in his eightieth year", and was buried in the Old Kirkyard at Selkirk. His widow Ann, who was sole executor of his estate, inherited a life-rent on lands purchased with her dowry, giving her an annual income of 2,000 merks.

The couple had three sons, and three daughters:

- Andrew (died 1776) succeeded to the indebted estate at The Haining, but passed it on to his younger brother John. He was successful advocate who served as Solicitor General for Scotland from 1755 until 1759, when he was appointed a Lord of Session with the judicial title Lord Alemoor.
- John (c. 1716–1792), took over the Haining estate from his brother, and inherited to the rest of his brother's estates in 1776. In 1778 he succeed his cousin Robert Pringle to the Clifton estate in Roxburghshire. He followed his father as MP for Selkirkshire from 1765 to 1786.
- Robert(1719-1775), doctor of medicine who went to Jamaica and became a planter. Died in Philadelphia 12 Oct 1775. Married unknown(maybe surname Phillips), daughters Mary Elizabeth (1756-1836) married Thomas Cargill(1746-1807) planter of Jamaica and Janet.
- Ann married Robert Rutherford of Fairnilee
- Helen and Violet both died unmarried

Parliament of Scotland
Preceded by John Murray of Bowhill; Sir James Murray of Philiphauch	Shire Commissioner for Selkirkshire; 1702–1707; With: John Murray of Bowhill	Succeeded by Parliament of Great Britain
Parliament of Great Britain
New parliament	Member of Parliament for Scotland; 1707–1708	Constituency split
New constituency	Member of Parliament for Selkirkshire; 1708 – 1729	Succeeded by James Rutherford
