= John Murray (footballer, born 1927) =

Former English footballer (1927–1988)

Personal information
- Full name: John George Murray
- Date of birth: 25 July 1927
- Place of birth: Lambeth, England
- Date of death: April 1988 (aged 60)
- Place of death: Fulham, England
- Position: Left back

Senior career*
Years	Team	Apps	(Gls)
1948–1949	Chelmsford City		
	Leyton Orient	0	(0)
- Sittingbourne
1951–1952	Gillingham	4	(0)
- Betteshanger Colliery Welfare
- * Club domestic league appearances and goals

John George Murray (25 July 1927 – April 1988) was an English footballer who played as a left back.

== Career ==
Murray began his senior career with Chelmsford City in 1948. In 1949, Murray joined Leyton Orient. After failing to make an appearance for the club, Murray signed for Sittingbourne. In 1951, Murray signed for Gillingham, making four Football League appearances for the club in the 1951–52 Third Division South. After leaving Gillingham, Murray joined Betteshanger Colliery Welfare.

== Death ==
John Murray died in Fulham in April 1988, at the age of 60.
