= Grace Jane Wallace =

Scottish author (1804–1878)

Grace Jane Wallace, Lady Wallace (née Stein formerly Lady Don; 1804 – 13 March 1878) was a Scottish author.

== Early life ==
Grace Jane Stein was born in 1804 as the eldest daughter of John Stein, an Edinburgh banker and distiller who served as MP for Bletchingley.

== Career ==
Lady Wallace "built a career and reputation for herself through her work as a translator, in particular with her translations of the lives and letters of contemporary musicians for Longman's, which remained the standard English versions for generations."

== Personal life ==
On 19 August 1824, she married, as his second wife, Sir Alexander Don, 6th Baronet of Newton Don, who was a close friend of Sir Walter Scott. Before his death on11 March 1826, they were the parents of two children:

- Sir William Henry Don, 7th Baronet (1825–1862), the actor who married twice.
- Alexina Harriet Don (c. 1826–1919), who married Sir Frederick Acclom Milbank, 1st Baronet, a grandson of the 1st Duke of Cleveland.

In his Familiar Letters (ii.348) Sir Walter Scott writes to his son in 1825: "Mama and Anne are quite well; they are with me on a visit to Sir Alex. Don and his new lady, who is a very pleasant woman, and plays on the harp delightfully".

After Sir Alexander died in 1826; Grace married Lt.-Gen. Sir James Maxwell Wallace (1785–1867) in 1836. Lady Wallace died on 12 March 1878 without children from her second marriage.

== Works ==
Lady Wallace long and actively pursued a career as a translator of German and Spanish works, among others:

- The Princess Ilse (by Marie Petersen), 1855
- Clara; or Slave-life in Europe (by Friedrich Wilhelm Hackländer), 1856
- Voices from the Greenwood, 1856
- The Old Monastery (by Friedrich Wilhelm Hackländer), 1857
- Frederick the Great and his Merchant (by Luise Mühlbach), 1859
- Schiller's Life and Works (by Emil Palleske), 1859
- The Castle and the Cottage in Spain (from the Spanish of Fernán Caballero), 1861
- Joseph in the Snow (by Berthold Auerbach), 1861
- Mendelssohn's Letters from Italy and Switzerland, 1862
- Will-o'-the-Wisp (by Marie Petersen), 1862
- Letters of Mendelssohn from 1833 to 1847, 1863
- Letters of Mozart, 1865
- Beethoven's Letters, 1790–1826, 1866
- Letters of Distinguished Musicians, 1867
- Reminiscences of Mendelssohn (by Elise Polko), 1868
- Alexandra Feodorowna (by August Theodor von Grimm), 1870
- A German Peasant Romance: Elsa and the Vulture (by Wilhelmine von Hillern), 1876
- Life of Mozart (by Ludwig Nohl), 1877.
