= John Murray (archdeacon of Dublin) =

Irish anglican priest (1916-2005)

John Desmond Murray (1916–2005) was an Irish Anglican priest: he was Archbishop's Archdeacon in the Province of Dublin from 1973 to 1982.

Murray was educated at Trinity College, Dublin and ordained in 1939. After three curacies in Dublin, he was a Minor Canon at St Patrick's Cathedral in the same city. He was the Incumbent at Powerscourt from 1949 to 1953; a Naval Chaplain from 1953 to 1955; at Dalkey from 1955 to 1970; and at Milltown from 1970 to 1982.
