= John Murray (Naperville founder) =

- Born: November 15, 1785
- Died: April 18, 1868 (aged 83); Naperville, Illinois
- Resting place: Naperville Cemetery, Naperville, Illinois
- Occupations: laborer, music teacher, soldier, businessman, politician, city planner
- Known for: being the co-founder, along with his brothers-in-law, Joseph and John Naper, and other early settlers, in 1831, of Naper's Settlement, the oldest, frontier, Illinois town
- Spouse: Amy Naper
- Children: 5
- Relatives: Joseph Naper (brother-in-law)

John Murray (November 15, 1785 – April 18, 1868) was a laborer, music teacher, soldier, businessman, politician, and city planner, was one of the original founders of Naperville, Illinois, with his children Sarah, Robert Nelson, Ruth, Amos and Cordelia. He was married to Joseph Naper's sister, Amy Naper.

== Early life ==
Murray was a laborer for hire and a music teacher, in the early 19th century, and was among the first settlers of Ashtabula, Ohio, along with Benjamin Naper, an older brother of Joseph. Benjamin's sister, Amy kept house for him, and John Murray and Amy were married in 1809. John and Benjamin both served in the local Ohio Militia regiment, during the War of 1812.

Amy's family soon joined them, in Ohio, and her younger brothers became Great Lakes captains, ship owners, and ship builders, like their father and older brothers. John Naper married Betsy Goff and started his family in Ohio, but Joseph and his wife Almeda Landon moved to New York state.

== Founding of Naperville ==
In 1831, Joseph and John Naper chose a spot, near the DuPage River, in Illinois, where they planned to relocate. They recruited family and friends from both states to accompany them and form an instant settlement. About 60 men, women and children loaded their belongings, onto the Telegraph, Joseph and John's schooner, along with seeds, provisions, and the iron works to build a saw mill. Amy and the Murray children were on board, but John Murray walked cross country with the settlement's livestock. The ship took nearly two months to navigate the Great Lakes, and John Murray arrived at Fort Dearborn, before the Telegraph arrived.

While living in early Naperville, John Murray drew up the first school subscription and became the DuPage County justice of the peace and constable.

== Death ==
Predeceased by his wife Amy, John Murray died April 18, 1868, in the home of his son, Robert Nelson Murray ("Judge" Murray), who was the first mayor of Kankakee, Illinois.
