= John Murray (physician) =

British scientist

Dr John Murray FRSE FGS (1778–1820) was a 19th century British medical doctor and scientist, working in the fields of physics, chemistry, and geology, and described by Brydges as a "Chemical Philiospher". His first important published work, "Elements of Chemistry", appeared when he was only 23.

== Life ==
He was born in Edinburgh in 1778 and educated at the High School. He studied medicine at St Andrews University graduating around 1798.

He appears in Edinburgh again in 1810 as a lecturer in chemistry. He later also lectured in Materia Medica, Pharmacy and Natural Philosophy (Physics).

In 1812 he was elected a Fellow of the Royal Society of Edinburgh for his contributions to geology, his proposers being Thomas Charles Hope, Robert Jameson, and Sir George Steuart Mackenzie. He was made a Fellow of the Royal College of Physicians of Edinburgh in 1815 and was also elected a Fellow of the Royal Geographical Society of London. He presented 28 papers to the Royal Society, the most important relating to proposals for a safety lamp for miners.

He received his doctorate (MD) in 1814.

He lived at 31 Nicolson Street in south Edinburgh and died there on 22 July 1820.

== Family ==
His children included Dr John Murray (1798–1873), who emigrated to Australia and died in Melbourne.

== Publications ==
- Elements of Chemistry (1801)
- A Comparative view of Huttonian and Neptunian Systems of Geology (1802)
- Elements of Materia Medica and Pharmacy (1804)
- A System of Chemistry (1806/7)
