= James Murray, Lord Philiphaugh =

Scottish judge and politician (1655–1708)

The Right Honourable Lord Philiphaugh PC
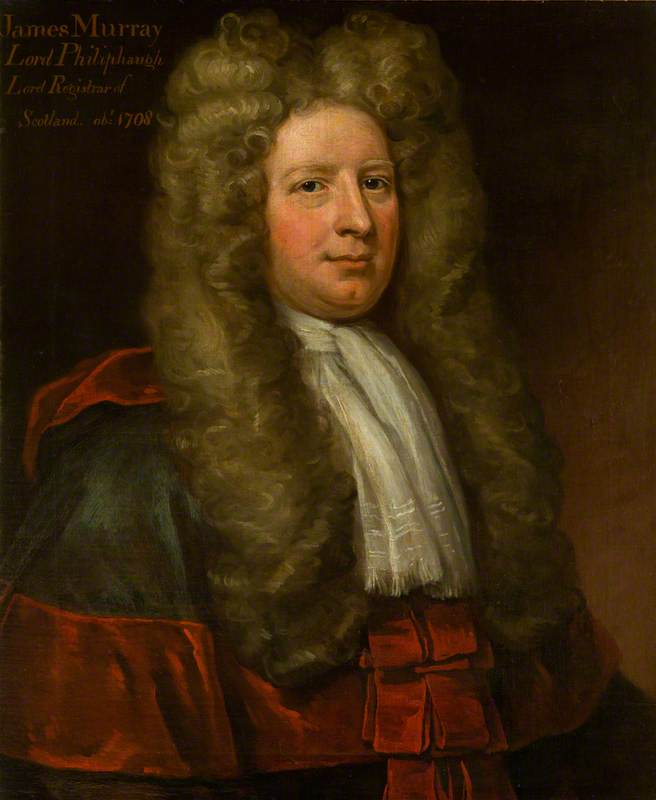
- Portrait by the circle of John Baptist Medina

Lord Clerk Register
- In office November 1702 – June 1704
- Preceded by: The Earl of Selkirk
- Succeeded by: James Johnston

Lord Clerk Register
- In office April 1705 – July 1708
- Preceded by: James Johnston
- Succeeded by: The Earl of Glasgow

Personal details
- Born: 11 July 1655 Eddleston, Peeblesshire
- Died: 1 July 1708 (aged 52) Inch, Wigtownshire
- Spouse(s): Anne Hepburn (m. 1678); Margaret Don (m. 1681)
- Children: 8, including John

Sir James Murray, Lord Philiphaugh (Note: Also known as Sir James Murray of Philiphaugh.) PC (11 July 1655 – 1 July 1708) was a Scottish judge and politician who twice served as Lord Clerk Register from November 1702 to June 1704 and from April 1705 to July 1708, when he died in office. Serving as a political advisor to the prominent statesman James Douglas, 2nd Duke of Queensberry, Murray assisted him in passing the 1707 Union with England Act through a divided Parliament of Scotland.

Born in Eddleston, Peeblesshire, Murray graduated from the University of Edinburgh in 1674 before being elected to the Scottish Parliament after the death of his father in the previous year. Murray also served as the Sheriff of Selkirk until a dispute with a Scots Army officer led to the Privy Council of Scotland to remove him from the office in October 1681. During this period, he married twice, having eight children with his second wife Margaret.

In 1684, Murray was arrested following the discovery of the Rye House Plot; confessing to the Privy Council of his involvement, Murray proceeded to testify against a range of accomplices. Despite the unpopularity Murray acquired in Scotland due to his testimony, after the Glorious Revolution of 1688, his fortunes began to recover and he was appointed an ordinary lord of session in November 1689 and Lord Clerk Register in November 1702.

In June 1704, due to the "Scotch plot", an unsuccessful attempt by the Duke of Queensberry to incriminate his political rivals, Murray temporarily stepped down as Lord Clerk Register and was replaced by James Johnston. He soon returned to power and once again assumed the office on 7 April 1705, continuing to serve as a political advisor to the Duke of Queensberry until dying while staying at the village of Inch, Wigtownshire in 1708.

== Early life ==
James Murray was born on 11 July 1655 in Eddleston, Peeblesshire. His father, Sir John Murray of Philiphaugh, was a politician and legal official who represented the Selkirkshire constituency in the Parliament of Scotland from 1661 to 1663; he also served as a commissioner for supply in 1661 and 1667, and commissioner for the borders in 1665. Murray's mother was Anne Murray, who was the daughter of Archibald Douglas, 13th of Cavers.

Murray attended the University of Edinburgh, graduating from the institution in 1674. After his father died in 1675, Murray sat on the Convention of the Estates of Scotland which assembled in Edinburgh in June 1678. From 1681 to 1682, Murray also sat in the Scottish Parliament, representing the constituency of Selkirkshire as well. During his lengthy political career, Murray served as a commissioner for supply in 1678, 1685, 1690, and 1704.

Murray, who had assumed the role of Sheriff of Selkirk in 1675, became involved in a dispute with Scots Army officer John Urquhart of Meldrum on 18 November 1680 over issues of legal jurisdiction between the two parties. The Privy Council of Scotland heard the case in January 1681, and issued a ruling on 6 October 1681 which stipulated that Murray was to be immediately removed from his position as sheriff because he had "malversed and been remiss in punishing conventicles." (Note: A contemporary, Lord Fountainhall, suggested that Murray's removal was a result of the decline in political influence of the Duchess of Lauderdale, who was a patron of Murray.)

== Arrest, testimony and restored fortunes ==
In September 1684, Murray was arrested and imprisoned following the discovery of the Rye House Plot, a secret conspiracy to assassinate the Stuart King Charles II and his brother (and heir apparent) James, Duke of York. In 6 September of that year, Murray was brought before the Privy Council and confessed to his involvement in the plot upon being threatened with the boot, a form of torture. Murray was soon released in 1 October on a 1,000 pound bail and granted a royal pardon by King Charles II on the condition that he testify against his accomplices.

Murray proceeded to testify against a wide range of accomplices, many of whom had already fled Scotland for other regions of Europe and were tried in absentia by the Scottish government. Testimony supplied by Murray was used in the trials of notables such as Walter Scott, 1st Earl of Tarras, Sir Patrick Hume and Baillie of Jerviswood (with Murray's testimony leading to Baillie's execution on 24 December 1684). As a contemporary observer noted a few years after the event, Murray "had a chief hand in ruining many families" during this period via his testimony.

In spite of distaste in Scotland towards Murray due to his testimony, after the Glorious Revolution of 1688, which saw William of Orange overthrow the House of Stuart and assume control over the English throne, his fortunes began to recover. Murray was appointed as an ordinary lord of session on 1 November 1689 and granted the formal title "Lord Philiphaugh". During this period, Murray started serving as a personal advisor to James Douglas, 2nd Duke of Queensberry. In May 1696, Murray was appointed as a member of the Scottish Privy Council and a lord of the exchequer.

In 1698, the Duke of Queensberry unsuccessfully attempted to appoint Murray to the position of Lord Justice Clerk, but political disputes between Queensberry and the Duke of Argyll "made consensus over appointments quite impossible." Three years later, the Earl of Selkirk was due to be replaced from his position as Lord Clerk Register, and Queensberry nominated Murray to succeed him, which was countered by Adam Cockburn's nomination. However, after Queen Anne succeeded to the throne in 1702, Murray was appointed to the position in November of that year.

During this period, Murray continued to serve as an effective political advisor. In 1700, Murray encouraged Queensberry to grant several concessions to the Parliament of Scotland over the disastrous failure of the Darien scheme, which had bankrupted much of the Scottish aristocracy and caused widespread discontent and anger. While serving as Lord Clerk Register, the Peace and War Act 1703 (c. 6) (S)) and the Act of Security 1704 (c.3 (S)), both of which were responses to the English Act of Settlement 1701, proved to be political setbacks for both Murray and Queensberry.

== Later life and death ==
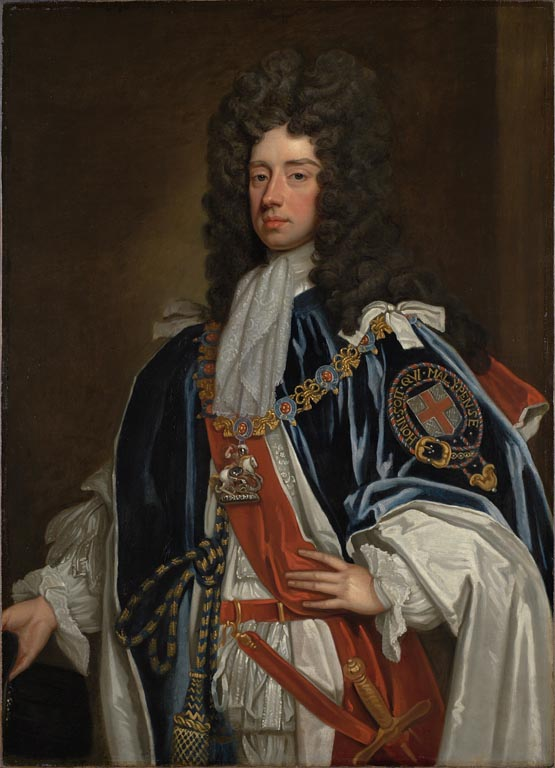
The 2nd Duke of Queensberry, who Murray served as a political advisor.

In June 1704, Murray was removed from political power following the discovery of the "Scotch plot", an unsuccessful attempt by the Duke of Queensberry to incriminate his political rival, John Murray, 1st Duke of Atholl after being manipulated by Simon Fraser, 11th Lord Lovat into doing so. Murray was temporarily replaced in the office of Lord Clerk Register by James Johnston, and the Duke of Queensberry also briefly stepped back from the Scottish political scene.

Murray returned to power on 7 April 1705, and once again assumed control of the office of Lord Clerk Register, where he assisted Queensberry in successfully passing the 1707 Union with England Act through a divided Scottish Parliament. The act, which was also passed in the English Parliament, united the kingdoms of Scotland and England into Great Britain. Queensberry's support for the Union with England Act made him hated among the Scottish public.

When Queensberry, then serving as Lord High Commissioner in 1707, attempted to pass an act of Parliament which would impose abjuration upon the Old Pretender, Murray opposed the attempt, warning that "such an act would carry us so far into the measure of England about the succession, that they would become careless and indifferent about the Union". Murray's advice successfully led Queensberry and his political associates to eventually dismiss the idea.

On 1 July 1708, Murray died while staying at Inch, Wigtownshire. As historian A. J. Mann noted in the Dictionary of National Biography, though Murray's will and testament has since been lost, "he was clearly a man of means", with his estate compromising lands in Kershope Burn, Roxburghshire and Philiphaugh, Selkirkshire; the latter property had been owned by the Murray family since the 1520s. These estates passed into the ownership of his first son, John.

Murray, like many in the Scottish elite, also held investments in the Company of Scotland Trading to Africa and the Indies. The joint-stock company was founded to monopolise Scotland's overseas trade with Africa, India and the West Indies, and was also responsible for the failure of the Darien scheme. David Boyle, 1st Earl of Glasgow, who had also supported the union between Scotland and England, succeeded Murray as Lord Clerk Register.

== Personal life, family and legacy ==
Early on in his political career, Murray was a supporter of radical politics, joining a group of radicals known as "the Club" which included John Cunningham, 11th Earl of Glencairn, William Ross, 12th Lord Ross, Duncan Forbes of Culloden, John Cochrane, 4th Earl of Dundonald and Sir Patrick Hume. Murray regularly met with his fellow radicals in an Edinburgh tavern to discuss how to proceed politically as the Convention of the Estates of Scotland were being held. Historian Ann Shukman credits the club with legitimising the Convention in the eyes of the Scottish public.

Scottish spy and writer John Macky described Murray in his personal memoirs as being of "fair complexion, fat, middle-sized" and "a great countryman"; Mann describes him as having "the wit to rekindle an effective political career". On 24 April 1678, Murray married his first wife, Anne, who was the daughter of Sir Patrick Hepburn of Blackcastle. Three years later in 1681, he married his second wife, Margaret, the daughter of Sir Alexander Don, 1st Baronet of Newton. Though Murray had no children by his first marriage, he had three sons and five daughters with Margaret.

Murray's first son, John, also chose to pursue a career in politics as well, representing the constituencies of Lanark Burghs and Selkirkshire in the Parliament of Great Britain from 1725 until 1747. In addition to his political career, John also served as a legal official as well, succeeding to the position of Sheriff of Selkirk after his father's death; he served in the position from 1708 until 1734. On 31 December 1711, John married Lady Eleanor Hamilton, the daughter of aristocrat Lord Basil Hamilton; the marriage resulted in four sons and two daughters. He died on 2 July 1753.

Murray's renown in Scotland during this period led him to be featured in Scottish folk music. In the Border ballad The Outlaw Murray, which was first published in Walter Scott's 1802 breakthrough anthology work Minstrelsy of the Scottish Border, a reference is made to Murray's tenure as a lord of session. This mention of him has led American folklorist Francis James Child to conclude in The English and Scottish Popular Ballads that the ballad was written sometime between 1689 and 1702, though he also noted that any original manuscripts of the ballad had since been lost.

Legal offices
Preceded by The Earl of Selkirk	Lord Clerk Register; November 1702 – June 1704	Succeeded by James Johnston
Preceded by James Johnston	Lord Clerk Register; April 1705 – June 1708	Succeeded by The Earl of Glasgow
