= Sir Alexander Don, 5th Baronet =

Scottish soldier

Colonel Sir Alexander Don, 5th Baronet of Newton Don, Kelso, Scottish Borders, (died 1815) was a Scottish soldier who served as a British Army officer during the French Revolutionary Wars.

== Biography ==
Alexander was the son of Sir Alexander Don, 4th Baronet of Newton Don, and Mary, daughter of John Murray of Philiphaugh.

Alexander succeeded to the title of 5th Baronet on 2 October 1776. In 1778 Sir Alexander was promoted to the rank of captain in the Southern Fencibles. On 21 April 1795 he was commissioned to Colonel of the newly formed Berwickshire Regiment (a fencibles cavalry regiment). He died on 5 June 1815.

== Family ==
In 1778 Sir Alexander married Lady Henrietta Cuninghame, daughter of Major-General William Cunningham, 13th Earl of Glencairn and Elizabeth Maguire. They had some children:

- Elizabeth (died 12 June 1795)
- Mary (died 12 June 1795)
- Alexander (1779–1826), his heir and the 6th baronet.

== Notes ==
Baronetage of Nova Scotia
| Preceded by Alexander Don | Baronet (of Newton); 1776–1815 | Succeeded by Alexander Don |
