= Stuckey and Murray =

American comedy music duo

Stuckey & Murray
- Edinburgh Fringe Fest
- Born: Andy Stuckey, Jon Murray; Dothan, Alabama, St. Albans, Vermont
- Occupations: Singers, songwriters, television writers
- Years active: 2001–present
- Website: stuckeyandmurray.com

Stuckey & Murray is an American comedy music duo from Brooklyn, New York.

Andy Stuckey and Jon Murray met when they were NBC pages in New York City in the early 2000s. They formed Stuckey & Murray in 2001 and have produced two full-length albums, Destination: Rock Bottom and Mythical Fornication. Destination: Rock Bottom was recorded over a weekend in Austin, Texas and Mythical Fornication was made in Brooklyn.

Two of the duo's songs from their album Mythical Fornication are featured in the independent film, Stuck Like Chuck. Stuckey & Murray's videos have about 20 million hits on YouTube. The duo created a music video series for Heavy.com and NBC's Dotcomedy in 2006.

Aside from performing, both Stuckey and Murray are freelance TV producers and writers in New York City. They have worked in television production for over 10 years.

== Television performance ==
Stuckey & Murray have been featured on several cable programs.

- E! 2008 "Pre-Oscar Show"(E!)
- "Cash Cab" (Discovery Channel)
- "It's On with Alexa Chung" (MTV)
- "Webjunk 20" (VH1)
- "The Chelsea Handler Show" (E!)
- "Attack of the Show!" (G4)
- "The Sauce" (Fuse)
- "Attack of the Geeks" (E!)
- "Munchies" (Fuse)
- "First Look" (NBC)
- College Sports Television Promos
- E4 in the United Kingdom

== Live performance ==
Stuckey & Murray performed at the BamaJam music festival in Enterprise, Alabama, which is southeast of Birmingham, Alabamaalongside The Defibulators. The two groups then traveled on The Redneck Riviera Tour and played shows in Atlanta; Athens, Georgia; Savannah, Georgia; Nashville; Birmingham, Alabama, and at The Flora-Bama in Pensacola, Florida.

In 2007 Stuckey and Murray performed at the Edinburgh Fringe festival, and were reviewed by Malcolm Jack of "The Scotsman." He said they were "Great stuff, in short, for 15-year-olds and Nuts readers". They have performed at the All Points West festival in Jersey City, New Jersey, the Reading and Leeds music festivals, the Latitude Festival, the Virgin Music Festival in Toronto, and the Montreal Comedy Festival in Montreal, Canada. Also at the Edinburgh Fringe festival Stuckey and Murray made a video of their song "Its Every Cuss Word We Know", which is a spoof of an R.E.M. song. The video went viral probably in large part due to its appeal to 15-year-olds.

Stuckey and Murray's ill-fated appearance on "Showtime at the Apollo" was met with a great deal of derision by the audience and caused host Steve Harvey to announce "Unh-unh, these white boys ain't RIGHT!"

== Fashion line ==
Promo for The Fuxedo

In 2008, Stuckey & Murray ventured into the realm of fashion with their invention of The Fuxedo. The Fuxedo is a fully functional cross between a jumpsuit and a tuxedo. Murray even wore his to his sister's wedding. The duo hoped to have The Fuxedo in production before the spring of 2011.

== Personal life ==
Andy Stuckey has diabetes. The duo wrote a song about how Stuckey discovered he got diabetes on Christmas Day in a song called "Santa Gave Me Diabetes."

Jon Murray created funny videos while growing up in Williston, Vermont east of Burlington, including a satire of the Beastie Boys' "Sabotage".
