= John Murray (archdeacon of Cashel) =

John Grainger Murray (born 1945) is an Anglican priest.

Murray was educated at the Church of Ireland Theological Institute and ordained in 1971. After curacies in Carlow and Limerick he was made Incumbent at Rathdowney from 1977 and Archdeacon of Ossory and Leighlin from 1992. On the death of David Woodworth in 1994 he was additionally made Archdeacon of Cashel, Waterford and Lismore.

He retired in 2014.
