= John Murray (dean of Killaloe) =

John Murray was an Anglican priest in Ireland in the eighteenth century.

A grandson of John Murray, 1st Duke of Atholl, he was born in Essex and educated at Queens' College, Cambridge. He was Dean of Killaloe from 1787 until his death on 25 June 1790.
