= John Murray (cricketer, born 1882) =

Scottish cricketer and British Army officer

Personal information
- Full name: John Congreve Murray
- Born: 21 August 1882; Edinburgh, Midlothian, Scotland
- Died: 23 September 1917 (aged 35); Poelcappelle, West Flanders, Belgium
- Batting: Right-handed
- Role: Wicket-keeper

Domestic team information
- Years: Team
- 1909–1913: Scotland

Career statistics
Competition	First-class
Matches	3
Runs scored	78
Batting average	15.60
100s/50s	–/–
Top score	34
Catches/stumpings	2/–
- Source: Cricinfo, 28 March 2021

John Congreve Murray (21 August 1882 – 23 September 1917) was a Scottish first-class cricketer and British Army officer.

The son of Patrick Murray, a solicitor, and his wife, Agnes Evelyn, he was born at Edinburgh in August 1882. He was educated at the Edinburgh Academy, where he played for the cricket XI. After completing his education, he became a stockbroker and was employed by Messrs Guild, Lawson and Murray. A member of the Grange Cricket Club, he was selected to play for Scotland in 1909, making his first-class debut against Ireland at Perth. Murray made a further two first-class appearances for Scotland, against the touring Australians in 1912 and Ireland in 1913, with both matches played at Edinburgh. Although a wicket-keeper, Murray only kept wicket in one of his first-class appearances. As a batsman he scored 78 runs with a highest score of 34.

Murray served in the First World War with the Royal Scots, being commissioned as a second lieutenant In January 1915, with promotion to the temporary rank of lieutenant following in July 1915. He arrived in France in June 1917 and proceeded to see action on the Western Front. Murray was confirmed in the rank of lieutenant in July 1917, with precedence from June 1916. He was seriously wounded in action on 20 September 1917, during the Battle of Passchendaele and succumbed to his wounds three days later. He was buried at the Dozingham Military Cemetery.
