= Sir Alexander Don, 6th Baronet =

Scottish landowner, officer and Member of Parliament

Sir Alexander Don, Bt

Member of Parliament for Roxburghshire
- In office 1814–1826
- Preceded by: Gilbert Elliot-Murray-Kynynmound
- Succeeded by: Henry Hepburne-Scott

Personal details
- Born: 5 May 1780
- Died: 11 April 1826 (aged 45) Kelso, Scottish Borders
- Spouse(s): Lucretia Montgomerie (m. 1809; died 1817) Grace Jane Stein (m. 1824; died 1826)
- Children: 2
- Parent(s): Sir Alexander Don, 5th Baronet; Lady Harriet Cunningham

Sir Alexander Don, 6th baronet (baptised 5 May 1780 – 11 April 1826), of Newton Don, Kelso, Scottish Borders, was a Scottish landowner, an officer in the British Army and a Member of Parliament (M.P.) for Roxburghshire from 1814 until 1826.

== Early life ==
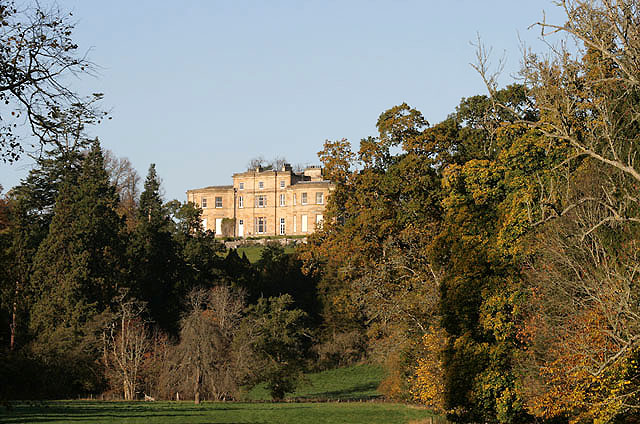
Newton Don as rebuilt in 1820

Alexander was baptised on 5 May 1780. He was the oldest son of Sir Alexander Don, 5th Baronet, and Lady Harriet Cunningham, daughter of William Cunningham, 13th Earl of Glencairn.

== Career ==
Alexander was a captain in the Roxburgh militia in 1802 and from 1803 to 1810, he lived the high life in Verdun in France.

He served in the Berwick Yeoman Cavalry from 1810 until 1813. He served as captain in the Roxburgh Yeomanry from 1814 and was promoted to major in 1821.

On Kirkwood's map of Edinburgh dated 1817 he is marked as owner of West Coates House and a large area south of it (now an area north of Haymarket Station). In 1820 he employed Robert Smirke to rebuild his mansion at Newton Don.

=== Political career ===
He was a Catholic-sympathising Tory politician, and was elected to represent Roxburghshire on the Buccleuch interest on 25 July 1814 (at his second attempt) and represented the burgh until 11 April 1826.

He attended the Parliament erratically and made no major speeches.

== Personal life ==
Sir Alexander married first in 1809, Lucretia Montgomerie (died 1817), daughter of George Montgomerie (formerly Molineux) of Garboldisham Hall, Norfolk. She died without any surviving children.

In 1824, Sir Alexander married Grace Jane Stein (1802-1878), who was twenty-two years his junior. Grace was a daughter of John Stein, a banker and distiller, of 37 Heriot Row, Edinburgh. Before his sudden death, they were the parents of two children:

- Sir William Henry Don, 7th Baronet (1825–1862), the actor who married twice.
- Alexina Harriet Don, who married Sir Frederick Milbank, 1st Baronet, son of Mark Milbank, MP for Camelford, and Lady Augusta Vane (a daughter of the 1st Duke of Cleveland).

He died very suddenly of a stomach complaint at Newton Don House near Kelso on 11 April 1826. After his death Grace married Sir James Maxwell Wallace of Ainderby Hall near Northallerton. On his son's departure to Australia, his estates passed to John Wauchope of Edmonstone and Niddrie, who thereafter took the name of Don-Wauchope.

== Other Sources ==
- Escott, Margaret (2009), "DON, Sir Alexander, 6th bt. (?1780–1826), of Newton Don, Berwick", in Fisher, D.R. (ed.), The History of Parliament: the House of Commons 1820–1832, Cambridge University Press

Parliament of the United Kingdom
Preceded by Gilbert Elliot-Murray-Kynynmound	Member of Parliament for Roxburghshire; 1814 – 1826	Succeeded by Henry Hepburne-Scott
Baronetage of Nova Scotia
Preceded by Alexander Don	Baronet (of Newton); 1815–1826	Succeeded by William Don
