= Jock Murray =

Jock Murray may refer to:

- Thomas John Murray (born 1938), Canadian neurologist, medical historian and author
- Jock Murray (publisher) (1941-1993), John Murray VI of John Murray publishing house
