= Shepherd Dawson =

British psychologist and author

Dr Shepherd Dawson FRSE (1880 – 1935) was a British psychologist and author. He specialised in a deeper understanding of Encephalitis lethargica and in the effects of childhood epilepsy upon intelligence. He was a strong believer in the use of statistics to demonstrate clinical conclusions. He served as president of the Psychological section of the British Medical Association.

== Life ==
Dawson was born in Whitehaven on the north-west coast of England.

He studied at Owen's College, Manchester graduating MA in 1902 and gaining a DSc after postgraduate study at King's College, London. Whilst in London he studied statistics under Karl Pearson and became fascinated by their use within clinical psychology. From 1910 he was Principal Lecturer in Psychology and Logic & Ethics at Jordanhill College in Glasgow. He was concurrently the Consulting Psychologist for the Royal Hospital for Sick Children in Glasgow.

In 1931 he was elected a Fellow of the Royal Society of Edinburgh. His proposers were James Drever, Sir William Wright Smith, Sir Godfrey Hilton Thomson, and James Hartley Ashworth.

He died in a Glasgow nursing home on 26 March 1935.

== Publications ==
From 1921 to 1927 he was joint editor of the Psychological Index. He also made numerous contributions to the British Journal of Psychology. His books include:

- Introduction to the Computation of Statistics (1933)
- Archives of Disease in Childhood (1934)
