= Jack Murray (Australian footballer) =

Australian rules footballer

Personal information
- Full name: John Francis Murray
- Born: 15 July 1913; Western Australia

Playing career
Years	Club	Games (Goals)
1935–1949	Swan Districts	170 (37)

Career highlights
- WA State Team (4 times); Swan Medal (1939,1947)

John Francis Murray (born 15 July 1913, date of death unknown) was an Australian rules footballer who played in the West Australian National Football League (WANFL).

Murray played 170 games from 1935 to 1940 and from 1945 to 1949, as either a ruckman or a defender, for the Swan Districts Football Club. "Had his career not been shortened by the war, he would almost certainly have been the Swans’ first ever 200 game footballer."

He made his interstate debut at the 1937 Perth carnival. against South Australia. In the period prior to World War Two, he played in 8 of Western Australia’s 9 matches, and after the war made a 9th appearance.

Murray won the fairest and best award at Swan Districts Football Club in 1939 and 1947 and was selected in the Swan Districts Team of the Century in the back pocket.
