= James Maxwell Wallace =

British Army general

General Sir James Maxwell Wallace KH
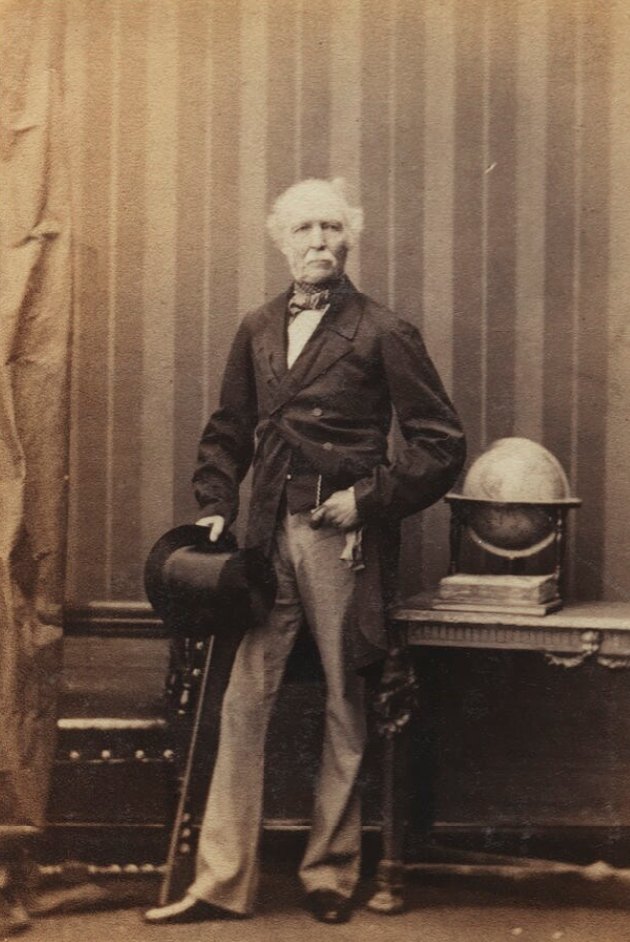
- Photograph of Wallace, 1861
- Born: 21 February 1783
- Died: 3 February 1867 (aged 83) Ainderby Hall, Northallerton, North Riding of Yorkshire, England

General Sir James Maxwell Wallace, KH (21 February 1783 – 3 February 1867), of Ainderby Hall, near Northallerton, was a British Army officer.

== Biography ==
James Maxwell was born the fifth son of John Wallace of Kelly, Renfrewshire, a Scottish landowner and owner of plantations in the West Indies. On his father's death in 1805, James succeeded to "half of his plantation of Biscany in the island of Jamaica". Robert Wallace (1773–1855) was his elder brother.

He entered the British Army as a cornet, and receiving a lieutenant's commission in 1806, was promoted as captain in the following year. While serving at the Cape of Good Hope as captain of the 21st Light Dragoons, he, in command of a squadron, accompanied Brigadier-General John Graham's expedition, which, after a struggle of seven months, drove the Xhosa across the Great Fish River.

He served in the campaign of 1815, and was present at the Battle of Quatre Bras, the retreat on 17 June, and the Battle of Waterloo. On 10 June 1815, he was appointed orderly officer to assist his brigade-major, and when that officer fell at Waterloo, he was promoted as his successor. In January 1817, he was advanced as Major, and in September 1823 was appointed Lieutenant-Colonel of the 5th Dragoon Guards (when Prince Leopold, afterwards king of the Belgians, was colonel). In 1831 he received the honour of knighthood.

When commanding the troops at Birmingham during the First Reform Bill agitation, the Riot Act was read and the troops were preparing to fire, when Sir James by a good humoured speech gained the ear of the mob, who dispersed peaceably.

Sir James was promoted as Colonel on 28 June 1838 and as Major-General on 11 November 1851. In January 1854 he was appointed Colonel for life of the 17th Lancers and made full General on 8 June 1863. On 24 June 1861, he was chosen to lead the procession attendant on the ceremonial of founding the National Monument in honour of the great hero of his house (William Wallace).

He died at his residence, Ainderby Hall, Northallerton, on 3 February 1867.

== Family ==
General Sir James Maxwell Wallace married, firstly, in 1818, Eliza Maria Hodges, daughter of Parry Hodges Esq. of Eastcourt in Wiltshire, who died without children on 4 September 1834.

He married, secondly, in April 1836, Grace Stein, daughter of John Stein, M.P. for Bletchingley, an Edinburgh banker and distiller. Grace was the young widow of Sir Alexander Don, 6th Baronet of Newton Don. As a composer and literary writer, Lady Grace Wallace attained eminence. She died on 12 March 1878 without any children by her second marriage.
