= The Haining =

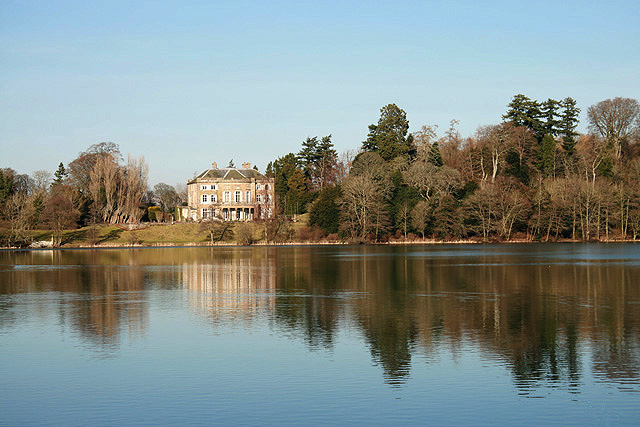
- The Haining across the loch

- Location in the Scottish Borders
- 55.5430°N 2.8431°W

Listed Building – Category A
- Designated: 16 March 1971
- Reference no.: LB15190

Inventory of Gardens and Designed Landscapes in Scotland
- Official name: The Haining
- Designated: 1 July 1987
- Reference no.: GDL00362

The Haining is a country house and estate in Selkirk in the Scottish Borders. The present house dates from the 1790s, and was a property of the Pringle family. In 2009, the house and grounds were bequeathed to The Haining Charitable Trust which manages the estate for the benefit of the people of Selkirkshire and the wider public. The Haining Charitable Trust is now working on developing the building as a centre for exhibitions and events, highlighting art, culture and history. The House is currently being refurbished and will be let out for various events and functions. The Old Coach House and Stable outbuildings have been refurbished and now offer six brand new artists studios. Holiday apartments, The Ettrick, and The Yarrow, and the two-bedroomed, Dairy Cottage, are also now available within the grounds available for booking via Visit Scotland. The "Old Ginger" statue is located in the kennel yard.

The house is protected as a category A listed building, and the grounds are included in the Inventory of Gardens and Designed Landscapes in Scotland, the national listing of significant gardens.

== History ==
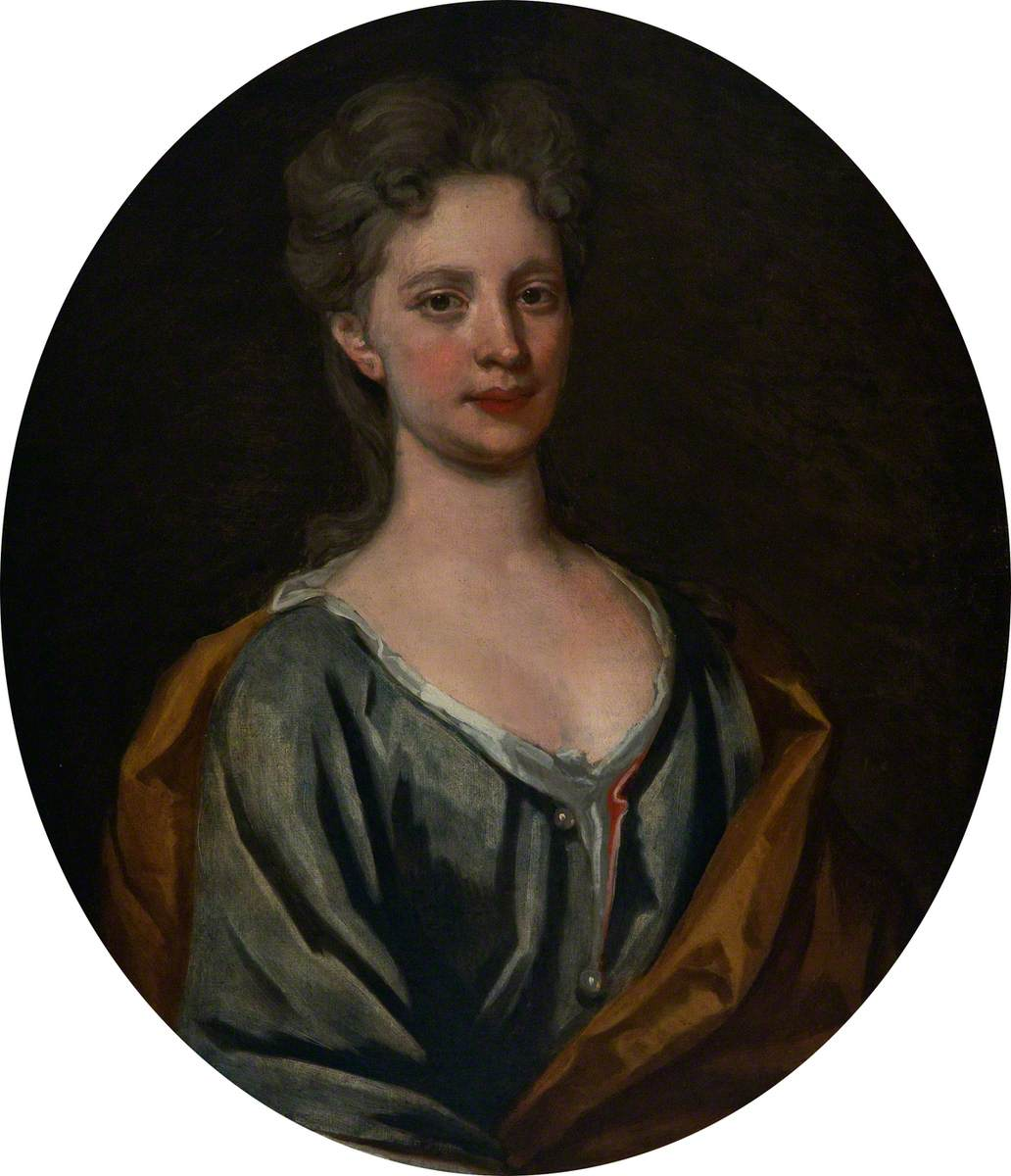
Portrait of Magdalene Riddell (wife of David Erskine, Lord Dun), by William Aikman

A motte to the north-east of the present house is the site of Selkirk Castle, first recorded in 1119. It was rebuilt by Edward I of England in 1301, during the Wars of Scottish Independence, with Sir Alexander de Balliol of Cavers in command. It was taken by the Scots the following year, but recaptured by the English before 1311. By 1334 it had been demolished.

The Haining is recorded in the 15th century as a property of the Scott family. In 1625 Lawrence Scott sold it to Andrew Riddell, of Riddell, who built up the estate in the 17th century. It passed to John Riddell, whose only child was Magdalene Riddell, who married David Erskine, Lord Dun. As the Erskine's already owned the House of Dun, they sold the estate to Andrew Pringle of Clifton in 1701 for his second son, John Pringle, a lawyer. The "old" house may have been commissioned by John Pringle, or it may have already been in place when he arrived. The designed landscape was begun by John, and extended during the 18th and 19th centuries, with extensive tree planting carried out.

In 1754 it was passed by Andrew Pringle's older son to John Pringle, merchant in Madeira, a younger brother of Andrew. It was passed in 1792 to the merchant's great nephew Mark Pringle. In 1794, Mark began construction of a new classical-style house, adjacent to the older house on the north shore of the loch. This new building has been attributed to Kelso-based architect and builder William Elliot. Mark died in 1812 and around 1820, his son John Pringle, who had inherited, remodelled the new house with an Ionic portico and loggia, to designs by architect Archibald Elliot. Further extensions were planned to replace the old house, but these were never carried out. Marble statues were installed on the garden terrace at this time, and several estate buildings including the stables were erected. Capt. John Pringle kept a menagerie on the estate, including a bear, wolf and monkey, whose cages still stand.

On John's death in 1831, the estate passed to his brother Robert, also a soldier, then their sister Margaret. Her daughter Anne Pringle-Pattison left The Haining to a relative, Andrew Seth (1856–1931), a philosopher at the University of Edinburgh, who subsequently took the name Pringle-Pattison. During these years the house was leased, until 1939, when the estate was split up and sold. The house was requisitioned by the military during the Second World War, and was occupied by Free Polish soldiers, including their mascot, Wojtek the bear. The adjoining old house burnt down in 1944, and was demolished in the late 1950s.

In 1959 The Haining was bought by Elina Pringle-Pattison, daughter of Andrew Seth Pringle-Pattison, and her husband Francis Nimmo-Smith.

== Present use ==
Andrew Nimmo-Smith, son of Eline Pringle-Pattison and Francis Nimmo-Smith, lived in the house until his death in 2009, when he left The Haining, including 160 acres (65 ha) of grounds, "for the benefit of the community of Selkirkshire and the wider public." Ownership of the house passed to the Haining Charitable Trust, which outlined its vision for the site in 2010. The Trust relies on volunteers for the operation and maintenance of the estate and house.

The Haining overlooks the Haining Loch, around which there is a circular walk which can be enjoyed by the public.

New public walking paths in the grounds were laid out in 2011.

On 26 September 2012, the house featured on the BBC Two programme Antiques to the Rescue.

The "Old Ginger” statue was unveiled on June 4, 2017 in The Haining's kennel yard (the kennels utilised the cages of The Haining's original menagerie). “Old Ginger” was created by Alexander Stoddart following a fund raising initiative organised by Dandie Dinmont Terrier enthusiasts. Alexander Stoddart has been the Queen's Sculptor in Ordinary in Scotland since 2008. "Old Ginger" was born at The Haining on June 4, 1842 and today every Dandie Dinmont Terrier can trace its breeding back through its male line to "Old Ginger". "Old Ginger" was the offspring of "Old Pepper", a dog caught in a trap and rescued by a gamekeeper at nearby Bowhill House.

Dandie Dinmont Terriers are amongst the oldest and rarest of dog breeds. The breed originates from the Scottish Borders and is on the UK Kennel Club's Vulnerable Native Breeds list. The Haining Kennels are unique in being the only fully traceable founding kennels of a dog breed in the world.

In February 2020 a tree fell over "Old Ginger" during Storm Dennis. The statue was undamaged, however, the tree and another in the kennel yard had to be felled. To replace them the Dandie Dinmont Terrier Club of Canada donated a Canadian Maple "friendship" tree and 3 flowering cherry trees to be planted in the kennel yard.

On the first Saturday in June each year The Dandie Derby takes place. This is an informal social event for Dandie owners and on average 70 Dandies attend. The terriers race in four lanes set up in the grounds in front of The Haining. The event was featured on ITV’S Secret Life of Dogs in 2017.

Since 2018 the Trust has operated a wedding venue with a marquee next to the house. Concerts, exhibitions, art classes, yoga classes, charity events, celebrations, plays, funeral wakes and sundry other events are also hosted at The Haining.

Extensive tree works and upgrades to footpaths around the loch and estate commenced in 2019 following a grant award of £200,000 from the Forestry Commission's 'Woodlands in and Around Towns' (WIAT) fund.
