= Don-Wauchope baronets =

Baronetcy in the Baronetage of Nova Scotia

The Don, later Don-Wauchope Baronetcy, of Newton, is a title in the Baronetage of Nova Scotia. It was created on 7 June 1667 for Alexander Don. The sixth Baronet sat as Member of Parliament for Roxburghshire The seventh Baronet was an actor. On his early death in 1862 the title passed to his kinsman John Wauchope, the eighth Baronet, who resumed the surname of Don in addition to that of Wauchope. He was the son of Lieutenant-Colonel John Wauchope, great-great-grandson of Patrick Don (husband of Anne, sister of Andrew Wauchope), third son of the first Baronet.

The "ch" in Wauchope is pronounced as in "Loch"; commented upon as a "puzzle in pronunciation" in the case of Andrew Wauchope during his 1892 political campaign against William Ewart Gladstone, when it was reported that he was "spoken of as Walk-up, Walk-hope, Wok-up, Watch-up, and Woochop ... the proper pronunciation appears to be Woke-up."

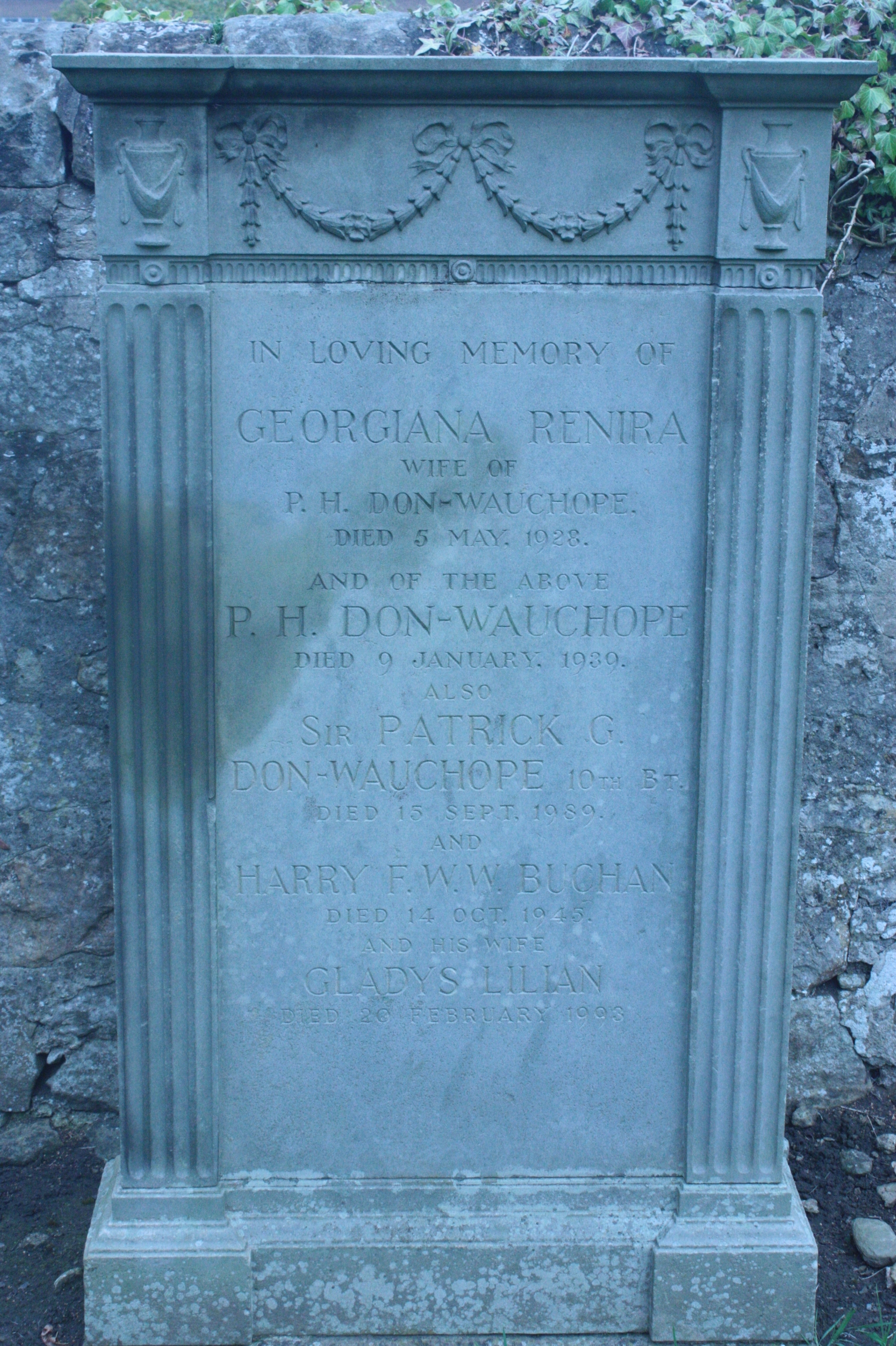
The grave of Patrick George Don-Wauchope, Comely Bank Cemetery

== Don, later Don-Wauchope baronets, of Newton (1667) ==
- Sir Alexander Don, 1st Baronet (died 1687)
- Sir James Don, 2nd Baronet (died c. 1710)
- Sir Alexander Don, 3rd Baronet (died 1749)
- Sir Alexander Don, 4th Baronet (died 1776)
- Sir Alexander Don, 5th Baronet (died 1815)
- Sir Alexander Don, 6th Baronet (1779–1826)
- Sir William Henry Don, 7th Baronet (1825–1862)
- Sir John Don-Wauchope, 8th Baronet (1816–1893)
- Sir John Douglas Don-Wauchope, 9th Baronet (1859–1951)
- Sir Patrick George Don-Wauchope, 10th Baronet (1898–1989)
- Sir Roger Hamilton Don-Wauchope, 11th Baronet (born 1938)

The heir apparent is the present holder's eldest son Andrew Craig Don-Wauchope (born 1966). His heir apparent is his son Alexander John Don-Wauchope (born 2000).

== Coat of arms ==
Escutcheon of the Don-Wauchope baronets

Coat of arms of Don-Wauchope baronets
Crest 1, A garb Or (Wauchope). 2, A pomegranate ppr. (Don). Escutcheon Quarterly, 1st and 4th, Azure two mullets in chief and a garb in base Or, a crescent for difference (Wauchope). 2nd and 3rd, Vert, on a fesse Argent three mascles Sable (Don). Motto Industria ditat and Non deerit atler aureus

== Sources ==
- Kidd, Charles, Williamson, David (editors). Debrett's Peerage and Baronetage (1990 edition). New York: St Martin's Press, 1990.
- Leigh Rayment's list of baronets
