= Selkirkshire (UK Parliament constituency) =

Parliamentary constituency in the United Kingdom, 1801–1868

- Former county constituency for the House of Commons
- Subdivision: Selkirkshire

1708–1868
- Seats: One
- Replaced by: Peebles & Selkirk; Hawick Burghs

Selkirkshire was a Scottish county constituency represented in the House of Commons of Great Britain from 1708 and after 1801 the House of Commons of the Parliament of the United Kingdom until 1868, when it was combined with Peeblesshire to form Peebles and Selkirk.

== Creation ==
The British parliamentary constituency was created in 1708 following the Acts of Union, 1707 and replaced the former Parliament of Scotland shire constituency of Selkirkshire.

== Boundaries ==
The constituency covered the whole county of Selkirkshire except for the county town of Selkirk which was represented separately as part of the Lanark Burghs constituency until 1832 when it was combined with Selkirkshire.

== History ==
The constituency elected one Member of Parliament (MP) by the first past the post system until the seat was abolished for the 1868 general election. It was combined with Peeblesshire to form Peebles and Selkirk.

== Members of Parliament ==
| Election | Member | Party | Notes |
|---|---|---|---|
| 1708 | John Pringle I | | appointed Lord of Session in 1729, as Lord Haining |
| 1730 by-election | James Rutherford | | |
| 1734 | John Murray | | Previously MP for Lanark Burghs 1725–34. Hereditary Sheriff of Selkirk 1708–34. |
| 1753 by-election | Gilbert Elliot | | |
| 1765 by-election | John Pringle II | | second son of Lord Haining |
| 1786 by-election | Mark Pringle | | |
| 1802 | John Rutherfurd | | |
| 1806 | William Eliott-Lockhart | Tory | |
| 1830 | Alexander Pringle | Tory | |
| 1832 | Robert Pringle | Whig | |
| 1835 | Alexander Pringle | Conservative | |
| 1846 by-election | Allan Eliott-Lockhart | Conservative | |
| 1861 by-election | The Lord Henry Montagu-Douglas-Scott | Conservative | Later 1st Baron Montagu of Beaulieu. MP for South Hampshire 1868–84. |
| 1868 | constituency abolished. See Peebles and Selkirk | | |

== Election results ==
=== Elections in the 1830s ===
General election 1830: Selkirkshire
| Party | Candidate | Votes | % |
|---|---|---|---|
| Tory | Alexander Pringle | Unopposed | |
| Registered electors | | 53 | |
| Tory hold | | | |

General election 1831: Selkirkshire
| Party | Candidate | Votes | % |
|---|---|---|---|
| Tory | Alexander Pringle | Unopposed | |
| Registered electors | | 53 | |
| Tory hold | | | |

General election 1832: Selkirkshire
| Party | Candidate | Votes | % |
|---|---|---|---|
| Whig | Robert Pringle (MP) | 133 | 51.8 |
| Tory | Alexander Pringle | 124 | 48.2 |
| Majority | | 9 | 3.6 |
| Turnout | | 257 | 91.5 |
| Registered electors | | 281 | |
| Whig gain from Tory | | | |

General election 1835: Selkirkshire
| Party | Candidate | Votes | % | ±% |
|---|---|---|---|---|
| Conservative | Alexander Pringle | 206 | 54.1 | +5.9 |
| Whig | Robert Pringle (MP) | 175 | 45.9 | −5.9 |
| Majority | | 31 | 8.2 | N/A |
| Turnout | | 381 | 90.1 | −1.4 |
| Registered electors | | 423 | | |
| Conservative gain from Whig | | Swing | +5.9 | |

General election 1837: Selkirkshire
| Party | Candidate | Votes | % | ±% |
|---|---|---|---|---|
| Conservative | Alexander Pringle | 262 | 54.9 | +0.8 |
| Whig | Robert Pringle (MP) | 215 | 45.1 | −0.8 |
| Majority | | 47 | 9.8 | +1.6 |
| Turnout | | 477 | 85.0 | −5.1 |
| Registered electors | | 561 | | |
| Conservative hold | | Swing | +0.8 | |

=== Elections in the 1840s ===
General election 1841: Selkirkshire
| Party | Candidate | Votes | % | ±% |
|---|---|---|---|---|
| Conservative | Alexander Pringle | Unopposed | | |
| Registered electors | | 612 | | |
| Conservative hold | | | | |

Pringle was appointed a Lord Commissioner of the Treasury, requiring a by-election.

By-election, 21 September 1841: Selkirkshire
| Party | Candidate | Votes | % | ±% |
|---|---|---|---|---|
| Conservative | Alexander Pringle | Unopposed | | |
| Conservative hold | | | | |

Pringle resigned after being appointed Clerk of Sasines, causing a by-election.

By-election, 12 February 1846: Selkirkshire
| Party | Candidate | Votes | % | ±% |
|---|---|---|---|---|
| Conservative | Allan Eliott-Lockhart | 223 | 100.0 | N/A |
| Whig | John Nesbitt-Murray | 0 | 0.0 | New |
| Majority | | 223 | 100.0 | N/A |
| Turnout | | 223 | 35.9 | N/A |
| Registered electors | | 622 | | |
| Conservative hold | | | | |

General election 1847: Selkirkshire
| Party | Candidate | Votes | % | ±% |
|---|---|---|---|---|
| Conservative | Allan Eliott-Lockhart | Unopposed | | |
| Registered electors | | 622 | | |
| Conservative hold | | | | |

=== Elections in the 1850s ===
General election 1852: Selkirkshire
| Party | Candidate | Votes | % | ±% |
|---|---|---|---|---|
| Conservative | Allan Eliott-Lockhart | Unopposed | | |
| Registered electors | | 497 | | |
| Conservative hold | | | | |

General election 1857: Selkirkshire
| Party | Candidate | Votes | % | ±% |
|---|---|---|---|---|
| Conservative | Allan Eliott-Lockhart | Unopposed | | |
| Registered electors | | 362 | | |
| Conservative hold | | | | |

General election 1859: Selkirkshire
| Party | Candidate | Votes | % | ±% |
|---|---|---|---|---|
| Conservative | Allan Eliott-Lockhart | Unopposed | | |
| Registered electors | | 361 | | |
| Conservative hold | | | | |

=== Elections in the 1860s ===
Eliott-Lockhart resigned, causing a by-election.

By-election, 1 August 1861: Selkirkshire
| Party | Candidate | Votes | % | ±% |
|---|---|---|---|---|
| Conservative | Henry Douglas-Scott-Montagu | 158 | 53.7 | N/A |
| Liberal | William Napier | 136 | 46.3 | New |
| Majority | | 22 | 7.4 | N/A |
| Turnout | | 294 | 81.4 | N/A |
| Registered electors | | 361 | | |
| Conservative hold | | Swing | N/A | |

General election 1865: Selkirkshire
| Party | Candidate | Votes | % | ±% |
|---|---|---|---|---|
| Conservative | Henry Douglas-Scott-Montagu | 227 | 53.7 | N/A |
| Liberal | William Napier | 196 | 46.3 | N/A |
| Majority | | 31 | 7.4 | N/A |
| Turnout | | 423 | 84.3 | N/A |
| Registered electors | | 502 | | |
| Conservative hold | | Swing | N/A | |

== Sources ==
- Craig, F. W. S. (1989) [1977]. British parliamentary election results 1832–1885 (2nd ed.). Chichester: Parliamentary Research Services. p. 604. ISBN 0-900178-26-4.
- History of Parliament: constituencies
- Leigh Rayment's Historical List of MPs – Constituencies beginning with "S" (part 2)
