= Lady Agatha Russell =

English editor

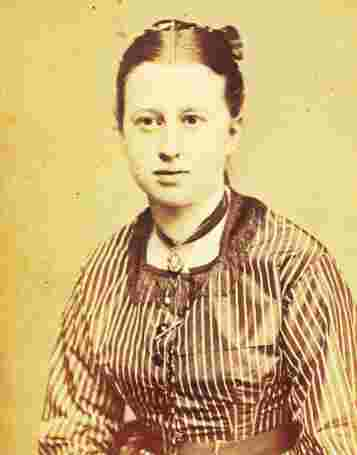
- Lady Agatha Russell
- Born: 28 March 1853; London, England
- Died: 23 April 1933 (aged 80); Hindhead, Surrey, England
- Parents: John Russell (father); Frances Elliot-Murray-Kynynmound (mother)
- Relatives: John Russell (brother); Rollo Russell (brother)

Lady Mary Agatha Russell (28 March 1853 – 23 April 1933) was an English editor.

She was born at Pembroke Lodge, Richmond Park, the daughter of the 1st Earl Russell and Frances, Countess Russell, and the aunt of Bertrand Russell. She was the co-editor of her mother's posthumously published memoirs, Lady John Russell: A Memoir with Selections from Her Diaries and Correspondence.

In 1912, Russell published a compilation of quotations and selections from authors, philosophers, poets, etc. entitled Golden Grain: Thoughts of Many Minds. The entries in Golden Grain are organized by date through a single year. It was prefaced by Frederic Harrison and published by James Nisbet and Company of London in 1912.

She died at Rozeldene, Hindhead, after a short illness.
