= Frances Russell, Countess Russell =

Wife of UK Prime Minister John Russell (1815-1898)

The Right Honourable The Countess Russell
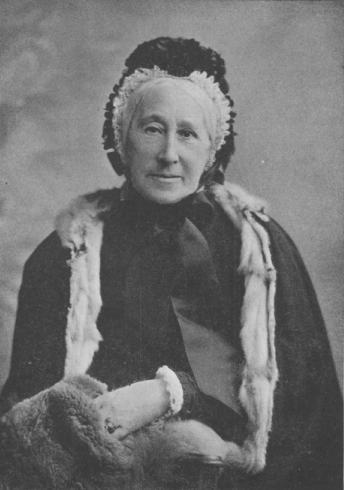
- Lady Russell in 1884
- Born: Lady Frances Elliot-Murray-Kynynmound; 15 November 1815; Minto, Roxburghshire, Scotland
- Died: 17 January 1898 (aged 82); Richmond-upon-Thames, England
- Resting place: Chenies, Buckinghamshire
- Known for: Spouse of the prime minister of the United Kingdom (1846–52; 1865–66)
- Spouse: John Russell, 1st Earl Russell (m. 1841; died 1878)
- Children: 4, including John Russell, Viscount Amberley and Rollo Russell; 6 stepchildren
- Parents: Gilbert Elliot-Murray-Kynynmound, 2nd Earl of Minto (father); Mary Elliot-Murray-Kynynmound, Countess Minto (née Brydone) (mother)

Frances Anna Maria Russell, Countess Russell (née Elliot-Murray-Kynynmound; 15 November 1815 – 17 January 1898), was the second wife of two-time Prime Minister of the United Kingdom John Russell, 1st Earl Russell. Between 1841 and 1861 she was known as Lady John Russell.

== Life ==
Frances was born in Minto, Roxburghshire, the second daughter of the Earl and Countess of Minto. She spent her early years at the family home of Minto House before moving to Berlin in 1832 when her father was made Minister to Prussia. In September 1835 her father was made First Lord of the Admiralty in the government of Lord Melbourne, which saw the family move to London. In 1840, at the age of 24, Frances received an offer of marriage from her father's cabinet colleague, Lord John Russell, who had been widowed two years previously. She initially rejected Lord John's proposal, before reconsidering and accepting. They were married on 20 July 1841 in the drawing room at Minto House.

Upon marriage Frances became stepmother to Lord John's two daughters from his first marriage, Georgiana and Victoria, as well as to his four stepchildren (the orphaned children of his first wife Adelaide and her first husband). They had four children of their own:

- John Russell, later Viscount Amberley (10 December 1842 – 9 January 1876)
- George Gilbert William Russell (14 April 1848 – 27 January 1933)
- Francis Albert Rollo Russell, known as Rollo (11 July 1849 – 30 March 1914)
- Mary Agatha Russell, known as Agatha (1853 – 23 April 1933)

In 1847, during Lord John's first term as prime minister, the Russells were granted the use of Pembroke Lodge, Richmond Park by Queen Victoria. It would remain the Russells' family home until Frances died in 1898.

In 1861 Lord John Russell was elevated to the peerage as Earl Russell and Frances henceforth became known as Countess Russell.

In 1876 the Russells' eldest son, Viscount Amberley, died from bronchitis, leaving two orphaned sons (their mother, Katharine Russell, Viscountess Amberley having died in 1874). They were John ("Frank") Russell (aged 10), who became 2nd Earl Russell, upon the death of his grandfather in 1878, and the future philosopher Bertrand Russell (aged 3). In his will, Amberley had named Douglas Spalding and T. J. Cobden-Sanderson as Frank and Bertrand's guardians, not wishing his children to be raised as Christians, but Lord and Lady Russell successfully contested the stipulation and assumed full guardianship of their grandsons. The deeply pious Lady Russell, notwithstanding her undoubted disapproval of some of its content, made sure that her son's book An Analysis of Religious Belief (which took a critical view of Christianity and other religions) was published a month after his death. Two years later Earl Russell died, leaving Lady Russell as Frank and Bertrand's sole guardian. In later life Bertrand Russell recalled his grandmother as: "the most important person to me throughout my childhood. She was a Scotch Presbyterian, Liberal in politics and religion...but extremely strict in matters of morality."

Countess Russell died at Pembroke Lodge on 17 January 1898 at the age of 82, having survived her husband by almost twenty years. She was buried alongside her husband in the Russell family chapel at St. Michael's Church, Chenies.

== Character ==
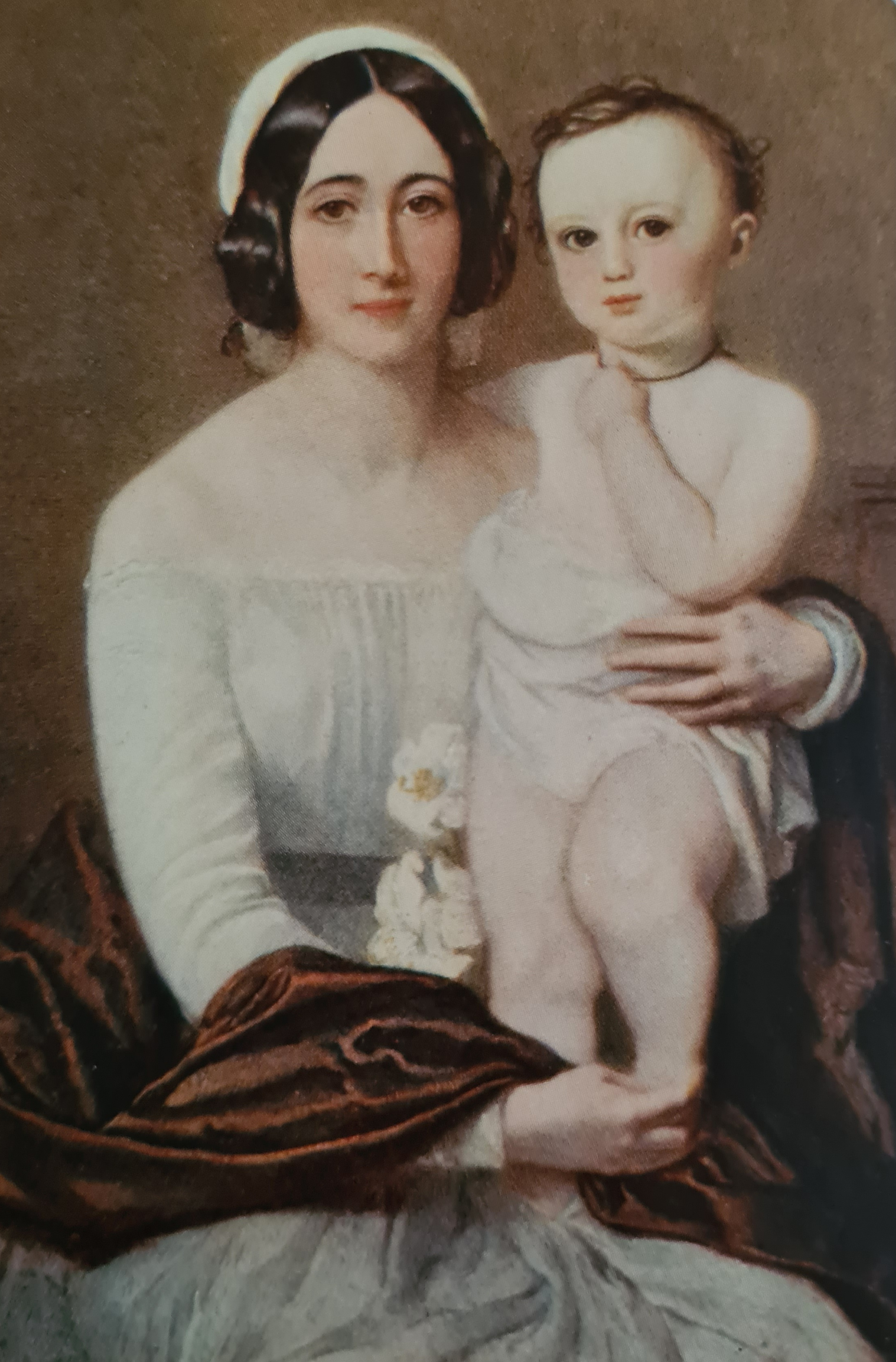
Lady John Russell depicted in 1844 with her eldest son

Lady Russell was a woman of strong religious and political convictions. She was raised as a Presbyterian before becoming a Unitarian in later life. The daughter of a Whig peer, she took an interest in politics from an early age. She was a supporter of liberal causes such as Italian Unification and Irish Home Rule and supported the North in the American Civil War out of an abhorrence of slavery.

Bertrand Russell, recalling his grandmother in later life, wrote that she was "completely unworldly" and "despised those who thought anything of worldly honours." According to Russell his grandmother lived austerely, disliked wine, hated tobacco, ate only the plainest food and "was always on the verge of becoming a vegetarian." While he found her strict Victorian morality excessive, Russell recalled Lady Russell as an affectionate grandmother and admired what he described as "her fearlessness, her public spirit, her contempt for convention, and her indifference to the opinion of the majority."

Lady Russell was fluent in French, German and Italian. She was well-versed in classic English and European literature but, according to Bertrand Russell, she had no interest in modern European literature. From the age of 15 she kept a diary, which she discontinued on the death of her husband forty-eight years later. After her death portions of the diary were edited and published by her daughter Agatha.
