= Gilbert Elliot-Murray-Kynynmound, 2nd Earl of Minto =

British diplomat and politician

The Right Honourable The Earl of Minto GCB PC
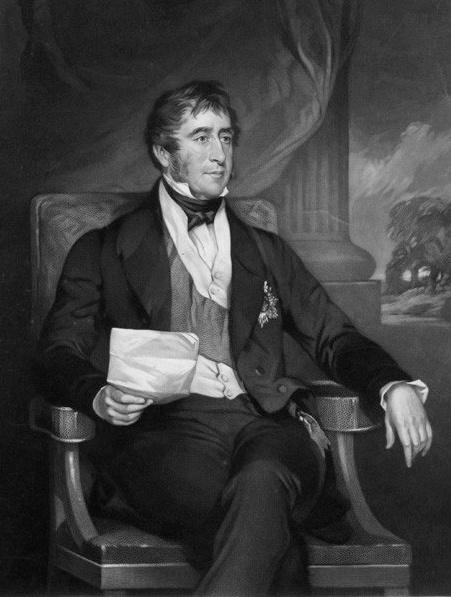

First Lord of the Admiralty
- In office 15 September 1835 – 30 August 1841
- Monarchs: William IV; Queen Victoria
- Prime Minister: The Viscount Melbourne
- Preceded by: The Lord Auckland
- Succeeded by: The Earl of Haddington

Personal details
- Born: 16 November 1782
- Died: 31 July 1859 (aged 76)
- Party: Whig
- Spouse: Mary Brydone (d. 1853)
- Children: 10; Frances Elliot-Murray-Kynynmound (daughter)
- Parent(s): Gilbert Elliot-Murray-Kynynmound, 1st Earl of Minto; Anna Maria Amyand
- Education: Eton College
- Alma mater: St. John's College, Cambridge; University of Edinburgh

Gilbert Elliot-Murray-Kynynmound, 2nd Earl of Minto, GCB, PC (/kɪˈnɪnmənd/; 16 November 1782 – 31 July 1859), styled as Viscount Melgund between 1813 and 1814, was a British diplomat and Whig politician.

== Background and education ==
Minto was the eldest son of the Gilbert Elliot-Murray-Kynynmound, 1st Earl of Minto, and Anna Maria, daughter of Sir George Amyand, 1st Baronet. He was educated at Eton, St John's College, Cambridge and University of Edinburgh.

== Diplomatic and political career ==
Minto was returned to Parliament for Ashburton in Devon in 1806, a seat he held until 1807, and then represented Roxburghshire between 1812 and 1814. He took a dim view of the Prince Regent and his government. The latter year he succeeded his father in the earldom and took his seat in the House of Lords. He was admitted to Privy Council in 1832.

From 1832 to 1834 he was Minister to Prussia. In 1835 he was appointed First Lord of the Admiralty under Lord Melbourne, a post he held until 1841, and later served as Lord Privy Seal under Lord John Russell from 1846 to 1852. In his youth, Elliot had gone to Corsica where his father was viceroy and he developed an abiding affection for Italy. He served as special envoy to Switzerland, Sardinia, Tuscany, Rome, Sicily in 1847–8. His influence in the Whig party was partly because his daughter, Lady Frances, was the wife of Lord John Russell.

== Family ==
Lord Minto married Mary, daughter of Patrick Brydone, in 1806. They had at least five sons and five daughters. Lady Minto died in July 1853. Lord Minto survived her by six years and died in July 1859, aged 75. He was succeeded in the earldom by his eldest son, William.

- Lady Charlotte (died 1899), married the Conservative MP Melville Portal.
- Harriet Anne Gertrude (d. 9 Feb. 1855). Died young
- William, 3rd Earl of Minto
- Lady Mary Elizabeth married Ralph Abercromby, 2nd Baron Dunfermline. They had one daughter who married the brother of Coutts Trotter.
- Hon. Sir Henry Elliot was a diplomat
- Sir Charles Elliot was an Admiral of the Fleet.
- Frances Anna Maria (1815–1898) married John Russell, later Prime Minister.
- Hon. George Francis (9 October 1822 – 14 February 1901), was a barrister. Died unmarried.
- Lady Elizabeth Amelia Jane (c. 1823 – 18 Jan. 1892), who married Lt.-Col. Frederick Romilly, son of Samuel Romilly. They had issue.
- Lt-Col. Hon. Gilbert (23 May 1826 – 25 May 1865), who married Katherine Anne Gilbert, daughter of Ashurst Gilbert, Bishop of Chichester. They had no issue.

== Arms ==
Coat of arms of Gilbert Elliot-Murray-Kynynmound, 2nd Earl of Minto
Crest A dexter arm embowed issuant from clouds, throwing a dart, all proper.. Escutcheon Quarterly : 1st and 4th grand quarters, quarterly; 1st and 4th, argent, a hunting-horn sable, stringed gules, in the dexter chief point a crescent of the last; on a chief wavy azure, three mullets of the field (Murray of Melgund); 2nd and 3rd, azure, a chevron argent, between three fleurs-de-lis or (Kynynmound of that ilk); 2nd and 3rd grand quarters, gules, on a bend engrailed or, a baton azure, within a bordure vair (Elliot, of Minto); over all, a chief of augmentation argent, charged with a Moor's head couped in profile proper., being the arms of Corsica. Supporters Dexter, an Indian sheep, sinister, a fawn, all proper. Motto Non eget arcu (He needs not the bow); Below: Suaviter et fortiter (Mildy and firmly).

Parliament of the United Kingdom
Preceded by Walter Palk; Sir Hugh Inglis, Bt	Member of Parliament for Ashburton; 1806–1807; With: Walter Palk	Succeeded by Walter Palk; Lord Charles Bentinck
Preceded by John Rutherfurd	Member of Parliament for Roxburghshire; 1812–1814	Succeeded by Sir Alexander Don, Bt
Diplomatic posts
Preceded by George Chad	British Minister to Prussia; 1832–1834	Succeeded by Sir George Shee, Bt
Political offices
Preceded by The Lord Auckland	First Lord of the Admiralty; 1835–1841	Succeeded by The Earl of Haddington
Preceded by The Earl of Haddington	Lord Privy Seal; 1846–1852	Succeeded by The Marquess of Salisbury
Peerage of the United Kingdom
Preceded by Gilbert Elliot-Murray-Kynynmound	Earl of Minto; 1814–1859	Succeeded by William Elliot-Murray-Kynynmound
