= Rollo Russell =

English meteorologist (1849–1914)

The Honourable Rollo Russell
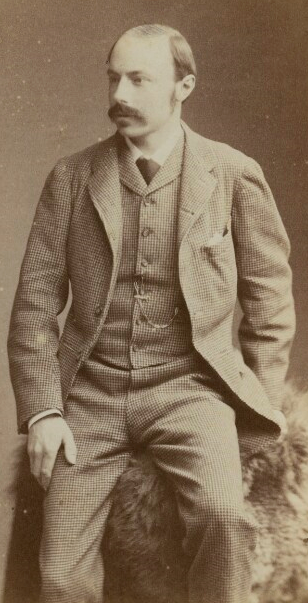
- Russell in the 1890s
- Born: Francis Albert Rollo Russell; 11 July 1849; Pembroke Lodge, Richmond Park, England
- Died: 30 March 1914 (aged 64); Holland Street, Kensington, London, England
- Occupations: Meteorologist; writer
- Spouses: Alice Sophia Godfrey (m. 1885; died 1886) Gertrude Ellen Cornelia Joachim (m. 1891)
- Children: 3
- Parents: John Russell, 1st Earl Russell (father); Lady Frances Elliot-Murray-Kynynmound (mother)
- Relatives: Bertrand Russell (nephew)

Francis Albert Rollo Russell (11 July 1849 – 30 March 1914) was an English meteorologist and scientific writer. Russell was also an alternative cancer treatment advocate who promoted the idea that cancer is caused by excessive consumption of meat, alcohol, coffee and tea.

== Biography ==
Russell was born at Pembroke Lodge, Richmond Park. He was the third son of then-serving Prime Minister Lord John Russell and was the uncle of Bertrand Russell. His mother was Lord Russell's second wife, Lady Frances. Russell was educated at Christ Church, Oxford and graduated with distinction in natural science in 1872. He worked as clerk for the British Foreign Office. Russell was reclusive and a shy man. He suffered from poor eyesight, resigned from the British Civil Service in 1888 and took up scientific writing. He studied the relationship between atmosphere and disease.

Russell married Alice Sophia Godfrey in 1885; they had a son Arthur. She died within a year and Russell married Gertrude Ellen Cornelia Joachim (sister of Harold H. Joachim) in 1891. They had a son John and a daughter Margaret. Russell was a Unitarian and a founding member of the Unitarian Christian Church in Richmond, in 1888. Russell has been described as an "advocate of vegetarianism".

The Nature journal positively reviewed Russell's Epidemics, Plagues and Fevers as a valuable service to public health for collecting important facts concerning preventable diseases.

Bertrand Russell in his autobiography noted that Rollo Russell stimulated his scientific interests. He wrote that Rollo Russell "suffered all his life from a morbid shyness so intense as to prevent him from achieving anything that involved contact with other human beings. But with me, so long as I was a child, he was not shy, and he used to display a vein of droll humour of which adults would not have suspected in him."

Russell died at Holland Street, Kensington from septicaemia. He is buried in the churchyard at Steep, Hampshire.

== Meteorology ==
Russell contributed to the Quarterly Journal of the Royal Meteorological Society and Symon's Meteorological Magazine. He authored an influential pamphlet London Fogs, in 1880, in which he argued that "smoke in London has continued probably for many years to shorten the lives of thousands". It was a prophetic warning, more than 70 years before the Great London Smog of 1952 killed an estimated 12,000 people. Apart from documenting the effects of fog on health, such as lung diseases, it also listed the damage caused to buildings and monuments.

Russell became a Fellow of the Royal Meteorological Society in 1868. He served on the council from 1879 to 1892 and in 1914, and was Vice-President 1893–1894. He co-authored an important meteorological paper on the global effects of the 1883 eruption of Krakatoa. His paper, On the Unusual Optical Phenomena of the Atmosphere, 1883–1886 co-authored with E. Douglas Archibald was published in the volume The Eruption of Krakatoa and Subsequent Phenomena by the Krakatoa Committee of the Royal Society.

== Cancer research ==
Russell argued from medical literature and statistical data that cancer is prevalent in communities where meat, alcohol, coffee and tea are excessively consumed. He recommended that governments should educate the public in restricting the consumption of these products as they increase the occurrence of cancer. In his book Notes on the Causation of Cancer, Russell commented that "I have found of twenty-five nations eating flesh largely, nineteen had a high cancer rate and only one had a low rate, and that of thirty-five nations eating little or no flesh, none had a high rate."

Russell examined cancer incidence and mortality in Benedictine and Cistercian monasteries. The monks abstained from meat or it only consisted of a small part of their diet. Russell found that the monks had a lower rate of cancer mortality compared to the general population and this confirmed the health benefits of a vegetarian diet. His statistical data was criticized by Sydney Copeman and Major Greenwood for lacking precision. In 1926, Copeman and Greenwood commented that:

It was, of course, obvious that his statistical evidence lacked precision; the age distributions and exact numbers of those exposed to risk were not available, and the evidence that deaths from cancer had really not occurred was hardly conclusive. But the author was, in our opinion, working on the right lines and had gone as far as a non-medical writer without special facilities for the consultation of official unpublished statistics would be able to go.

Russell's Notes on the Causation of Cancer received a mixed reception from the medical community. A review in the Medical Record disagreed with Russell that excessive alcohol or meat consumption causes cancer and concluded that the book "cannot be recommended as authoritative either to the lay public or to the medical profession." However, a review in the New York Medical Journal found his arguments valid and suggested that the book "demand[ed] the attention of the medical profession." A positive review in The New England Journal of Medicine stated that "though doubtless not conclusive, such a work is of value as a contribution to the study and ultimate solution of the great problem."

His book Preventable Cancer was positively reviewed in the Journal of the American Medical Association, which concluded that "many interesting facts, figures and opinions on cancer are collected and set forth in this book." Conversely, the New York Medical Journal attacked his statements as inaccurate and dismissed the book because Russell was not qualified in medicine. A review in the Nature journal criticized the book, noting that "Mr. Russell has made the mistake of comparing statistics which are no way comparable." However, statistician Frederick Ludwig Hoffman positively reviewed the book, commenting that it contained "some exceptionally valuable observations on the relation of diet to cancer frequency, the temperature of food, the increase of excessive alimentation, and a rough outline of certain supposed factors accountable for cancer occurrence."

== Selected publications ==
- London Fogs (1880)
- On the Unusual Optical Phenomena of the Atmosphere, 1883–1886 (With E. Douglas Archibald, 1888)
- Psalms of the West (1889)
- Smoke in Relation to Fogs in London (1889)
- Epidemics, Plagues and Fevers: Their Causes and Prevention (1892)
- Break of Day and Other Poems (1893)
- On Hail (1893)
- The Atmosphere in Relation to Human Life and Health (1896)
- Strength and Diet (1906)
- The Artificial Production of Persistent Fog (1906)
- Distribution of Land (1907)
- The Reduction of Cancer (1907)
- Preventable Cancer: A Statistical Research (1912)
- Early Correspondence of Lord John Russell, 1805–40 (1913)
- Notes on the Causation of Cancer (With a Preface by Dr. Dawtrey Drewitt, 1916)

== See also ==
- Pea soup fog
