= GHQ Liaison Regiment =

WW2 British special operations unit

- Active: 1939–1945
- Country: United Kingdom
- Branch: British Army
- Type: Special reconnaissance unit
- Role: Airborne force; Direct action; Forward observer; Long-range penetration; Special reconnaissance
- Garrison/HQ: Pembroke Lodge, Richmond Park
- Nickname: "Phantom"
- Engagements: Dunkirk evacuation; Operation Overlord; Operation Market Garden

Commanders
- Notable commanders: George Hopkinson; Alexander (Sandy) McIntosh

GHQ Liaison Regiment (known as Phantom) was a special reconnaissance unit of the British Army first formed in 1939 during the early stages of World War II. The regiment's headquarters were at The Richmond Hill Hotel in Richmond, Surrey (now in London); its base (including the officers' mess and billet) was at Pembroke Lodge, a Georgian house in Richmond Park, London.

== History ==
It had its origins as the No 3 British Air Mission in France in 1939. Moving with the Belgian General Staff, its role was to report information about the Allied forward positions from Belgian GHQ to the Advanced Air Striking Force HQ so as to pinpoint the changing locations of "bomb lines". These were the battle areas not occupied by Allied troops and suitable targets for bombs and shells.

In November 1939, Lieut-Col George 'Hoppy' Hopkinson was sent as a military observer to the No 3 British Air Mission and subsequently changed the method of operations to focus upon greater use of wireless communications and mobility to provide assessment from the front line. 'Phantom', the collective code name for these missions, was chosen by themselves and later became an official term.

After the Dunkirk evacuation, the unit was re-formed as No 1 GHQ Reconnaissance Unit. As such, it was intended to have a key intelligence role following any Nazi invasion of Britain. In January 1941, the Reconnaissance Corps was established and Phantom was re-named GHQ Liaison Regiment to avoid confusion. Phantom recruited men with various talents, linguists, drivers and mechanics – and undertook rigorous training in wireless communication and cipher.

In January 1944, the Reconnaissance Corps was absorbed into the Royal Armoured Corps and with it the Phantom GHQ Liaison Regiment. Phantom was disbanded in 1945 and then reborn as the Army Phantom Signals Regiment (Princess Louise's Kensington Regiment) until 1960, when it was clear that technology provided for alternative solutions.

=== Operation Overlord ===
During Operation Overlord, in June 1944, many patrols from Phantom came to Normandy on D+1. Their task was to go around day and night to find all the British, Canadian and American units they could, marking their locations on a map, and passing the information to the main HQ.

=== Operation Market Garden ===
During Operation Market Garden, in September 1944, the only communication between the surrounded airborne troops at Arnhem and headquarters was via a Phantom patrol. This included the famous, desperate, message from Major-General Roy Urquhart that "... unless physical contact is made with us early 25 Sept...consider it unlikely we can hold out long enough ..." Two Phantom officers were awarded the Military Cross for maintaining these vital communications during the operation. Phantom units also operated with XXX Corps and with General Browning whose HQ was next to the 82nd Airborne HQ in Groesbeek.

== Organisation ==
Phantom deployed in squadrons in north-west Europe, south-east Europe, North Africa and Italy. Each squadron supported an Army and consisted of a squadron HQ (SHQ) and a number of patrols (one per corps and a further ten further forward of corps). Each patrol consisted of an officer, an NCO and up to nine other ranks. They were typically equipped with Norton motorcycles, Jeeps, Morris 15cwt trucks and White M3 A1 Scout cars and carried a 107 Receiver, 52 and 22 sets. The patrols either embedded with other formations or went on special missions from their Army HQs. The patrols' role was to provide collection, passage and dissemination of contemporaneous information on the progress of battle to corps HQ.

For Operation Overlord, one patrol was assigned to each divisional HQ of I and XXX Corps to land with main divisional HQ. Thus on D-Day, three Patrols (5, 8 and 14) landed with the 3rd British, 50th Northumbrian and 3rd Canadian Divisions. Some patrols undertook parachute drops with the Special Air Service (SAS) to provide communications with SAS Brigade HQ. Later, with Phantom efficiency proven and with US forces under the leadership of the 12th US Army Group, similar arrangements were made for Phantom to provide communications with US corps.

== Officers ==
Famous Phantom officers included the actors Major David Niven (who initially commanded A Squadron and who remarked in a letter, "these were wonderful days which I would not have missed for anything"), Tam Williams and Willoughby Gray; the MPs Sir Jakie Astor, the Hon. Michael Astor, Peter Baker, Sir Hugh Fraser, Maurice Macmillan (Viscount Macmillan), Sir Carol Mather and Christopher Mayhew (Lord Mayhew); Law Lord Nigel Bridge, Baron Bridge of Harwich. The journalist Sir Peregrine Worsthorne and Metropolitan Police Commissioner Sir Robert Mark. Others, such as Michael Oakeshott and John Hislop, excelled in the fields of academe or athletics.
