= Pembroke Lodge, Richmond Park =

Coordinates: 51°26′33″N 0°17′40″W

Pembroke Lodge
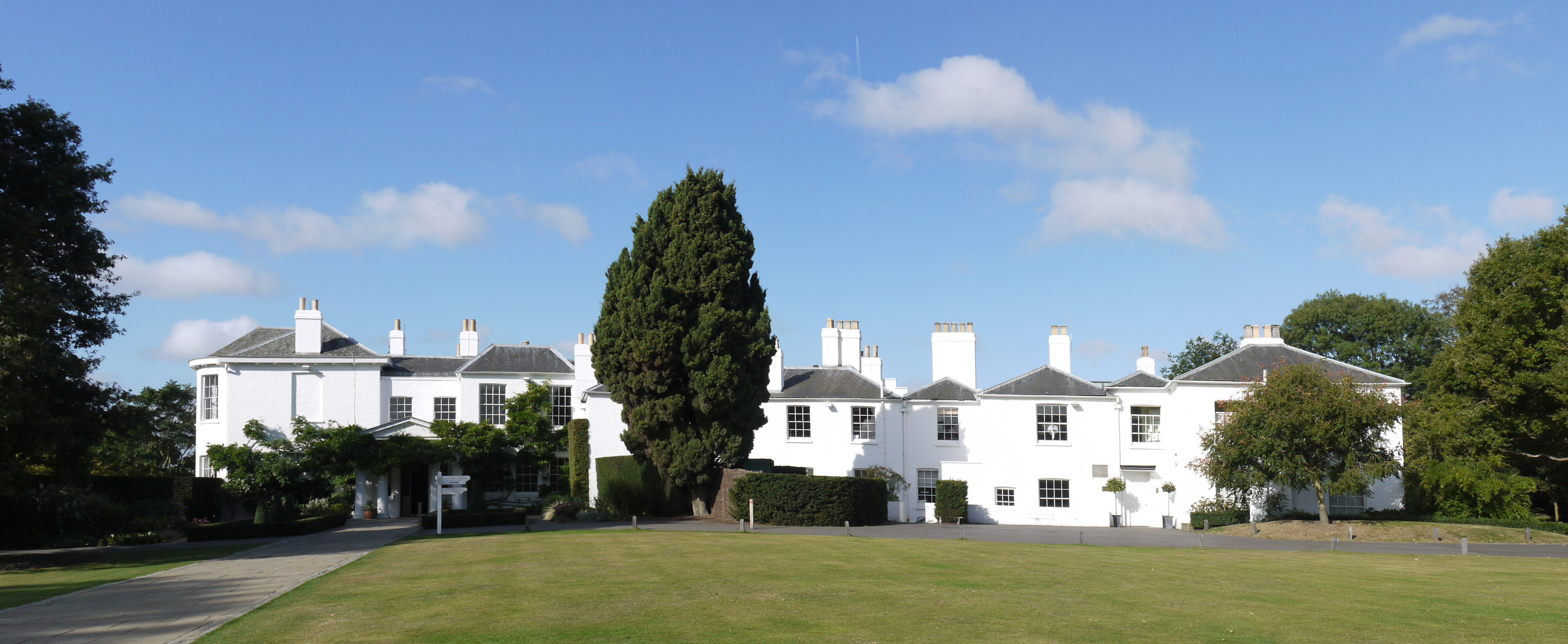
- Pembroke Lodge
- Interactive map of Pembroke Lodge
- Location: Richmond Park, TW10 5HX (London Borough of Richmond upon Thames), England, UK

History
- Built: mid-18th century

Site notes
- Area: Eleven acres (45,000 m²)of surrounding grounds
- Architectural style: Georgian
- Restored: 2005
- Restored by: The Royal Parks and the Hearsum Family
- Governing body: Crown Estate

Listed Building – Grade II
- Official name: Pembroke Lodge
- Designated: 25 May 1983
- Reference no.: 1263437

Pembroke Lodge is a Georgian two-storey large house in Richmond Park in the London Borough of Richmond upon Thames. It sits on high ground with views across the Thames valley to Windsor, the Chilterns and hills in the Borough of Runnymede. It has 11 acres (4.5 ha) of landscaped grounds, including part of King Henry's Mound from which there is a protected view of St Paul's Cathedral in the City of London. The grounds also include memorials to the 18th-century poet James Thomson and the 20th-century rock-and-roll singer and lyricist Ian Dury.

Grade II-listed with English Heritage, Pembroke Lodge is of historical interest, having housed British prime minister Lord John (later, Earl) Russell and the childhood home of his grandson, philosopher and logician Bertrand Russell. GHQ Liaison Regiment ("Phantom") used the premises during World War II. The lodge is part of the Crown Estate and is currently privately run as a catering facility and a conference and wedding venue on a long lease from The Royal Parks. It also houses a heritage charity, The Hearsum Collection.

== History ==
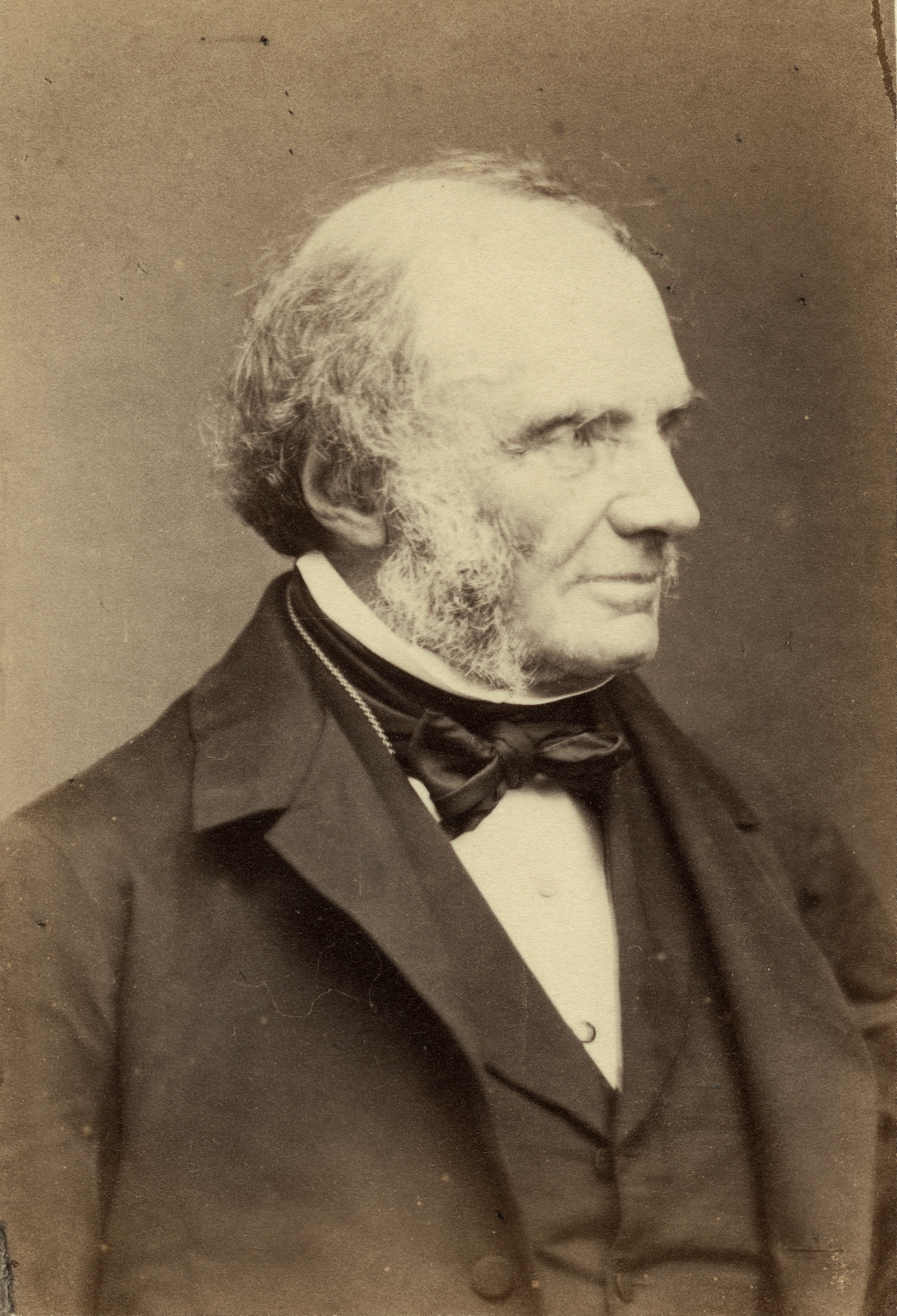
Lord John Russell

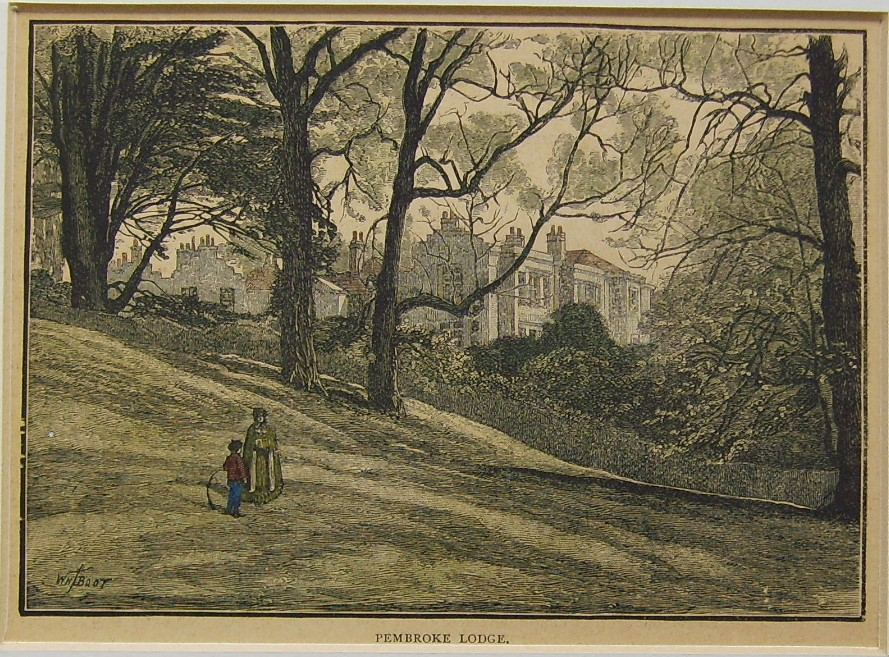
Pembroke Lodge in the 1880s

The lodge is first mentioned in 1754, when it was a one-roomed cottage occupied by a molecatcher. He was employed to eradicate molehills that were impeding the sport of deer hunting. The cottage was enlarged to become a house with four principal rooms and was renamed Hill Lodge.

It was granted to Elizabeth Herbert, Countess of Pembroke and Montgomery, a "close friend" of King George III, at her request in 1787. Between 1788 and 1796 she extended the building, to a design by Sir John Soane, to form the entire Georgian wing and part of the north wing. She died, aged 93, at Pembroke Lodge in 1831. After the Countess of Pembroke's death the Lodge was occupied by William Hay, 18th Earl of Erroll.

In 1847, Queen Victoria granted the lodge to Lord John Russell, then Prime Minister, who conducted much government business there and entertained Queen Victoria, foreign royalty, aristocrats, writers (Dickens, Thackeray, Longfellow, Tennyson) and other notable people of the time, including Garibaldi. Lord John was much taken with the Lodge – "an asset that could hardly be equalled, certainly not surpassed in England". Earl Russell (as he had become) died there on 28 May 1878; Fanny, his second wife, in 1898. Their daughter Lady Agatha Russell left the inscribed memorial stone that stands in the rose garden:

Pembroke Lodge 1847–1902 — In loving memory of my Father and Mother, Lord and Lady Russell and of our supremely happy home at Pembroke Lodge

Lord John Russell's grandson, Bertrand Russell, the mathematician, philosopher and social activist, grew up there between 1876 and 1894. At Pembroke Lodge, he wrote, "I grew accustomed to wide horizons and to an unimpeded view of the sunset".

From 1903, until her death there in February 1929, Pembroke Lodge was tenanted by Georgina, Dowager Countess of Dudley, a close friend of Queen Alexandra. There is a headstone in Pembroke Lodge's gardens to the grave of her dog, Boy, who died in 1907.

From 1929 to 1938, John Scott Oliver, a wealthy industrialist, lived at Pembroke Lodge. During World War II, the GHQ Liaison Regiment (also known as Phantom) established its regimental headquarters nearby at The Richmond Hill Hotel, with its base (including the officers' mess and billet) at Pembroke Lodge. Some of the members of the squad went on to become privy councillors, law lords, judges, MPs, a commissioner of the Metropolitan Police (Sir Robert Mark) and actors – including David Niven, who remarked in a letter, "these were wonderful days which I would not have missed for anything". After World War II, Pembroke Lodge became a government-run tea room.

== Current use ==
In 1997 Daniel Hearsum (1958–2021) took over Pembroke Lodge, then a run-down catering facility, restoring it and developing it into a successful cafe and wedding venue. Pembroke Lodge is open to the public for refreshments, weddings and conferences. Pembroke Lodge is also the home of The Hearsum Collection, a registered charity that collects and preserves the heritage of Richmond Park and is seeking to build a new purpose-built heritage centre to provide full public access to its holdings.
