= Kirkton, Scottish Borders =

Village in Scottish Borders, Scotland

Coordinates: 55.4166°N 2.7291°W

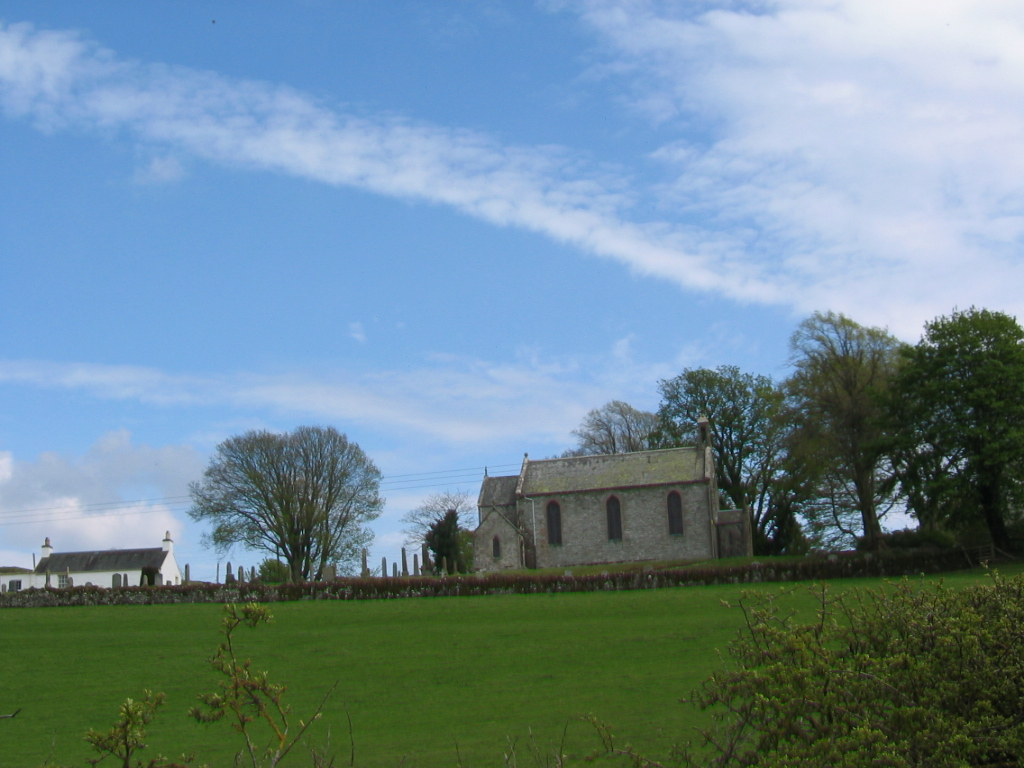
Kirkton Church, near Hawick

Kirkton is a village in the Scottish Borders area of Scotland, off the A6088, near Hawick. Grid Ref. NT5413.

It is a former parish, amalgamated into the parish of Cavers in 1895.

Places nearby include Abbotrule, Bedrule, Bonchester Bridge, Denholm, Hallrule, Hobkirk, Wilton Dean and the Wauchope Forest.

== See also ==
- List of places in the Scottish Borders
- List of places in Scotland
