= Rubers Law =

Hill in Scotland

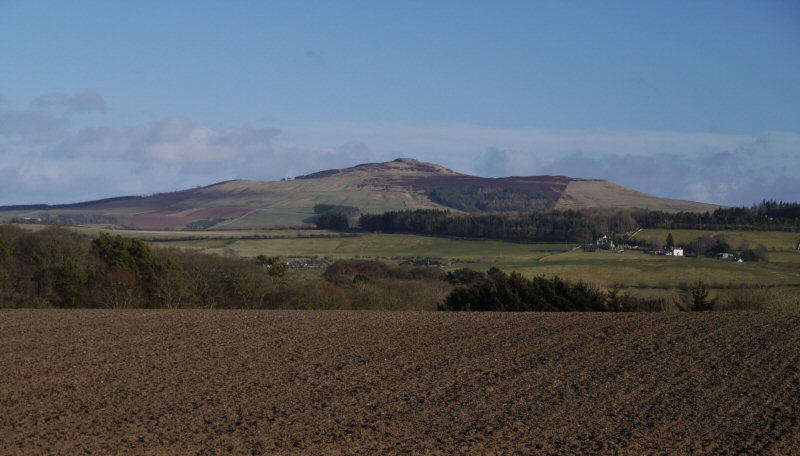
- Rubers Law, seen from the edge of Hawick

Highest point
- Elevation: 424 m (1,391 ft)
- Prominence: 196 m (643 ft)
- Parent peak: Peel Fell
- Listing: Marilyn
- Coordinates: 55°25′56″N 2°39′53″W

Geography
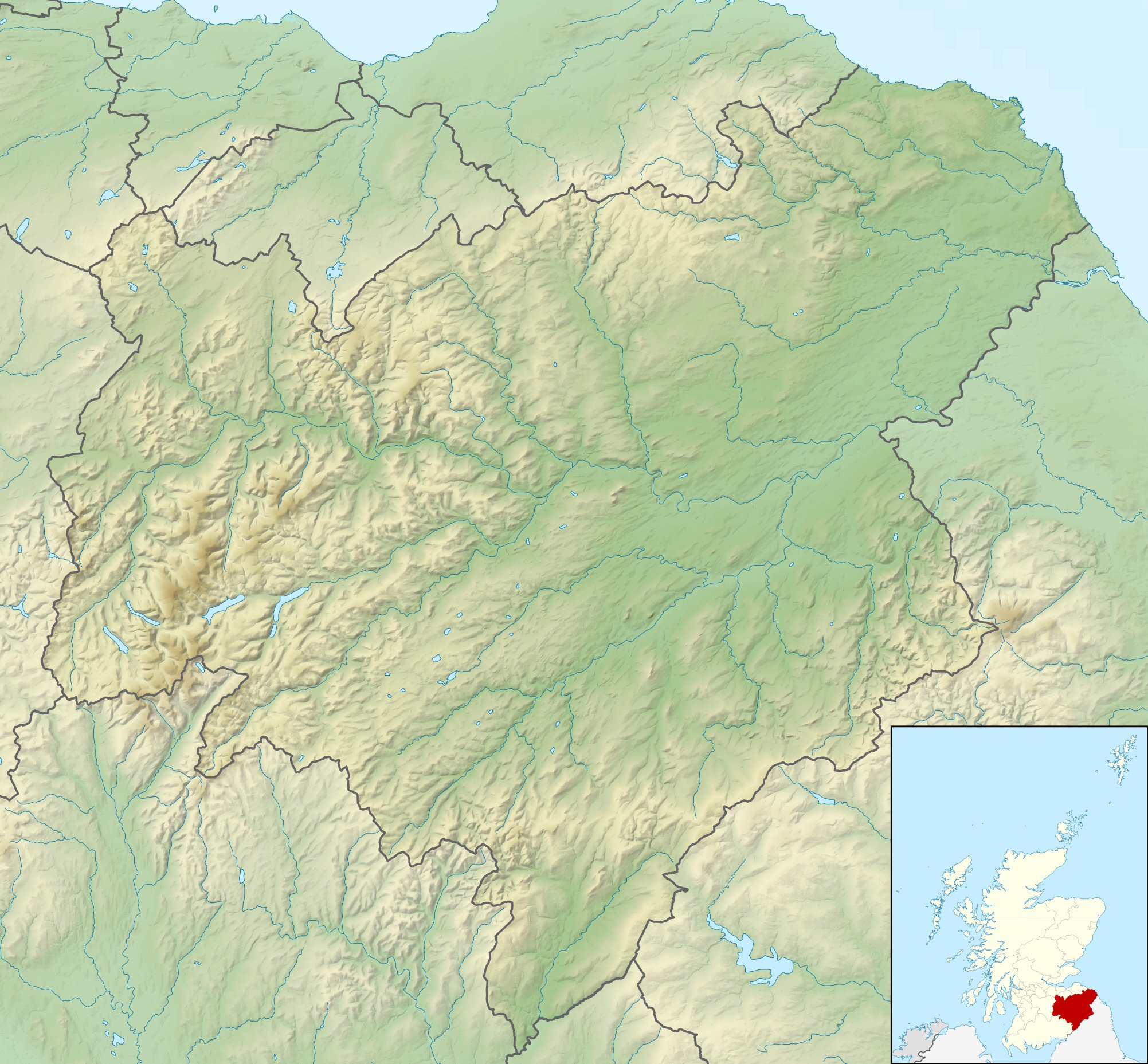
- Location within Scottish Borders
- Parent range: Cheviot Hills
- OS grid: NT 58032 15569
- Topo map: OS Explorer 331, Landranger 80

Rubers Law (or locally probably more often Ruberslaw) is a prominent, conical hill in the Scottish Borders area of south-east Scotland. It stands on the south bank of the River Teviot, between the towns of Hawick and Jedburgh, and south of the village of Denholm. The hill is on the border between the historic parishes of Cavers and Hobkirk, and until 1975 it stood within the historic county of Roxburghshire.

Much of the hill is agricultural land with coniferous plantations, and with rough grazing land around the top. A number of routes to the rocky summit of the hill are possible for walkers, from which there is a wide view in all directions. The summit rocks represent the remains of a volcano, formed by a volcanic eruption during the Carboniferous Period, roughly 330 million years ago. On and around the summit are the remains of several historical structures: an Iron Age hill fort, a Roman signal station, and a "nuclear fort" of the Early Middle Ages. Alexander Peden may have preached to illegal conventicles of Covenanters from a place known as "Peden's Pulpit" among the summit rocks. The poet Dr John Leyden, who was born in Denholm, climbed the hill in his youth, and described it in a poem of 1803.

== Name ==
Law is a common word for a hill in the south-east of Scotland, especially in Lothian (the Lothians) and The Borders. It comes from the Anglo-Saxon word hlāw (tumulus or hill). The origin and meaning of the first element of the name, Rubers, is not known.

== Topography ==
Rubers Law is a conical hill, elongated in a north–south direction. While it stands in relative isolation, it is linked to Peel Fell by a ridge of high ground, and so forms a northern projection of the Cheviot Hills which straddle the Anglo-Scottish border. It stands on the south bank of the River Teviot and forms a conspicuous landmark from much of Teviotdale. It rises to 424 m and has a prominence of 196 m above the col to its south. This is well in excess of the 150 m prominence needed to classify it as a Marilyn. All sides of the hill drain into the Teviot. The southern and eastern slopes do so via the Rule Water, and the western slopes via the Dean Burn.

The summit of the hill is rocky. The summit ridge is surrounded by cliffs 40 to 50 feet (12 to 15 m) high except to the north-east. Two lower rock ridges lie beside it, separated from the summit ridge by large gullies. A plateau stretches round the south and east sides of the summit, and 50 feet (15 m) lower a natural terrace passes round the hill from the south and east. A chasm splits the cliff above the plateau, and is known as Peden's Pulpit.

From the summit there is a wide view all round, from the Cheviot Hills to the south and east, the Eildon Hills to the north with the Lammermuir Hills in the distance, Hawick to the west with the hills of Liddesdale and Selkirkshire beyond it.

== Land use ==
Most of Rubers Law is agricultural land, divided into a patchwork of fields by dry stone walls and fences, along with strips and patches of coniferous woods. The summit is surrounded by rough grazing pasture. The presence of shooting butts and reports of walkers show that the land is also used for pheasant shooting. In 2021 Red Deer began to be raised on the ground surrounding Rubers Law. A commercial camp site has options for isolated pitches in some of the woods on the hill.

== Routes ==
Borders Abbeys Way crosses the north-east flank of the hill, between Denholm and Bedrule. There are no other recognised footpaths on the hill, but Scottish access rights allow responsible access to the land.

From Denholm routes may begin either on Dean Road (south of the village post office) to a track up the hill which begins by an electricity sub-station, or by following the Borders Abbeys Way and then going through Denholmhill Wood. Both routes then continue through (or beside) the strip of woodland leading south. From the end of the woods a well-used path leads to the summit. From the west a farm track leads from Whitriggs Farm part of the way. A number of fields must then be crossed beside another strip of woodland. From the east, near West Lees or the Billerwell road end, routes can follow a track through the trees of West Lees Plantation, or cross a series of fields south of the woods. These routes lead to paths to the summit.

== Geology ==
Most of Rubers Law is made of red sandstones and other sediments which used to be known as the Upper Old Red Sandstone. These rocks, now assigned to the Stratheden or Inverclyde groups (undifferentiated), were formed during the late Devonian or early Carboniferous Periods from the sand and gravel deposits of ancient river systems.

This sedimentary deposition was followed by a period of volcanic eruptions which produced a series of basaltic lavas, some of which are now found near Kelso. The summit rocks of Rubers Law were formed within a volcanic vent. There is a small area of volcanic agglomerate, formed in the vent by an explosive eruption of magma from the volcano. The rest of the summit rocks are microgabbro (previously known as dolerite), the remains of a volcanic plug formed from magma which solidified within the vent. Another microgabbro plug is located among the trees of Denholmhill Wood, 2 km north of the summit.

== Geodesy ==
Up to 1919 Rubers Law was the origin (meridian) of the 6 inch and 1:2500 Ordnance Survey maps of Roxburghshire. After that the maps of Roxburghshire were drawn according to the meridian of Lanark Church Spire in Lanarkshire.

== History ==
A number of structures have been built on or around the summit of Rubers Law. The earliest may have been an Early Iron Age hill fort or oppidum, represented by the remains of an outer wall, running at the same level around the hilltop, enclosing an area of 7 acres (2.8 ha) with a well-marked entrance to the south. No Roman masonry has been incorporated into this wall, suggesting an early date, though it is also possible that it could be the wall of a cattle compound associated with a later post-Roman fort.

A Roman signal station on the hilltop may be inferred from the presence of many Roman dressed sandstone blocks on the hill, many decorated with a diamond pattern. The same pattern was found on stones at the Roman site of Castlecary on the Antonine Wall. These leave no doubt that a Roman building once stood on the hilltop, and in that position this could only have been a signal station. A workman digging field drains on the south-east side of the hill in 1863, 400 feet (120 m) below the summit, discovered a hoard of bronze vessels of Roman age. These included a beautifully decorated handle of a bronze ewer, and the handles, rims and fragments of about a dozen other vessels. These are now held in Hawick Museum.

A post-Roman fort, consisting of an inner enclosure or citadel on the summit of the hill, and an annex to the south including the southern rock ridge and the plateau, was built of loose boulders but also incorporated masonry from the earlier Roman building. The citadel measured 235 by 105 feet (72 by 32 m) and the annex was 300 feet (91 m) long. The structure is one known as a "nuclear fort" of the Early Middle Ages. A hut circle within the citadel was excavated in 1907 but no remains were found apart from small quantities of charcoal and burnt bones.

In the 17th century Alexander Peden may have preached to a conventicle of Covenanters from a chasm in the cliffs on Rubers Law which is known as Peden's Pulpit. The restoration of King Charles II of Scotland in 1660 was followed by an attempt to impose Episcopal polity upon the Church of Scotland. The Covenanters were those who vigorously sought to maintain the Kirk's Presbyterian polity. Ministers ejected from the Kirk, like Peden, preached to illegal conventicles of their followers in the open air between 1660 and 1688.

On Easter Day in 2000 another open-air service of worship was held on the summit of Rubers Law. People from Bedrule, Denholm and Minto churches met there to commemorate both the two thousandth anniversary of the birth of Jesus Christ, and earlier Christians who had worshipped in that place. The event is recorded by a metal plate fixed to the summit rocks of the hill. Bedrule church holds a service of worship on Rubers Law each Easter Day.

== Poetry ==
The Scottish romantic poet Dr John Leyden (1775-1811), who was born in Denholm, described going up Rubers Law in his poem Scenes of Infancy (1803).

Oft have I wandered, in my vernal years,
Where Ruberslaw his misty summit rears,
And, as the fleecy surges closed amain,
To gain the top have traced that shelving lane,
Where every shallow stripe of level green,
That, winding, runs the shattered crags between[16]

In another passage he described a storm on the hill, and the presence of eagles (known as erne) on it.

Dark Ruberslaw, that lifts his head sublime,
Rugged and hoary with the wrecks of time!
On his broad misty front the giant wears
The horrid furrows of ten thousand years;
His aged brows are crowned with curling fern,
Where perches, grave and lone, the hooded Erne,
Majestic bird! by ancient shepherds stiled
The lonely hermit of the russet wild,
That loves amid the stormy blast to soar,
When through disjointed cliffs the tempests roar,
Climbs on strong wing the storm, and, screaming high,
Rides the dim rack, that sweeps the darkened sky.[16]

== See also ==
- List of places in the Scottish Borders
- List of Marilyns in the Scottish Lowlands
