= Southdean =

Coordinates: 55.3761°N 2.5835°W

Southdean: Scots: Soothdean
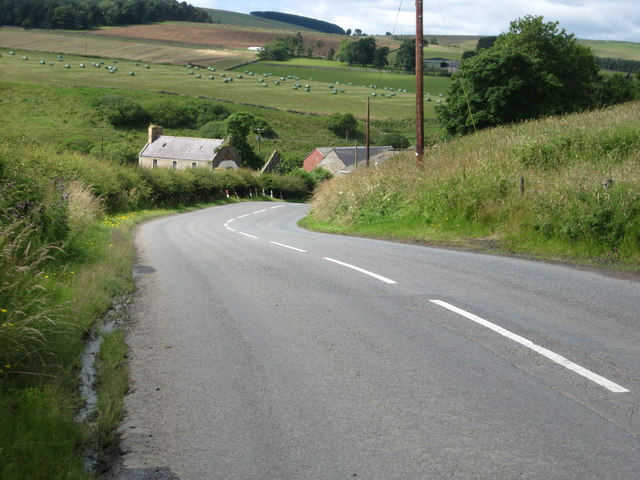
- A6088 road through Southdean

- Location within the Scottish Borders
- Language: English; Southern Scots
- OS grid reference: NT631092
- Council area: Scottish Borders
- Lieutenancy area: Roxburgh, Ettrick and Lauderdale
- Country: Scotland
- Sovereign state: United Kingdom
- Post town: HAWICK
- Postcode district: TD9
- Dialling code: 01450
- Police: Scotland
- Fire: Scottish
- Ambulance: Scottish
- UK Parliament: Berwickshire, Roxburgh and Selkirk
- Scottish Parliament: Ettrick, Roxburgh and Berwickshire

Southdean is a hamlet in the Scottish Borders area of Scotland, on the A6088, by the Jed Water and in the Wauchope Forest area. Other settlements nearby include Abbotrule, Bedrule, Bonchester Bridge, Denholm, Hallrule, Hobkirk and the Swinnie Forest.

Ruins which can be seen nearby include the remains of Southdean Old Parish Church, the remains of Dykeraw Tower, and the remains of Slack's Tower.

James Telfer (1802 - 1862) was born in Southdean, and he became a teacher. He wrote ballads about farming life.

== See also ==
- List of places in the Scottish Borders
- List of places in Scotland
