= Spittle (disambiguation) =

Spittle may refer to:

- Another term for saliva
- Fasting spittle used a cure
- The Spittles coastline in Dorset, UK
- Spittle bug, a type of Hemipteran insects
- Spittle (surname)

== See also ==
- Spital (disambiguation)
- Spittler (surname)
