= Spitler =

Spitler is a surname. Notable people with the surname include:

- Austin Spitler (born 1986), American football linebacker
- Johannes Spitler (1774–1837), American furniture painter
- Mann Spitler (1825–1889), American politician from Virginia
- Mark Spitler, American scientist

== See also ==
- Spittle (surname)
- Spittler, surname
