= Bonchester =

Bonchester (Scots: Binster) may refer to:

- Bonchester Bridge, hamlet in the Scottish Borders area of Scotland
  - Bonchester cheese, soft Scottish cheese, named after the above hamlet
