= Fulton Tower =

Ruined 16th-century tower house in the Scottish Borders

Coordinates: 55.4346°N 2.6251°W

Fulton Tower is a ruined 16th century tower house, about 4.5 miles (7.2 km) south west of Jedburgh, Scottish Borders, Scotland, and about 2 miles (3.2 km) south of Bedrule, east of the Rule Water.

Alternatively the castle may be called Rule Water or Fulton Farm.

== History ==
The castle belonged to the Homes. Margaret Hume of Cowdenknowes was life-rented in the lands of Fulton in 1570, before her marriage to William Turnbull, son and heir of Thomas Turnbull of Bedrule. The lands then passed to the Turnbulls.

The castle was burnt during the war now known as the Rough Wooing. The English commander Lord Hertford reported that on 16 September 1545, "I sent forth a good band to the number of 1500 light horsemen in the leading of me [and] Sir Robert Bowes, which from 5 a.m. till 3 p.m., forayed along the waters of Tyvyote and Rowle, 6 or 7 miles beyond Jedburgh, and burnt 14 or 15 towns and a great quantity of all kinds of corn". A list of twelve places on the Rule Water burnt during the raid comprises "Rowle, Spittel, Bedrowle (Bedrule Castle), Rowlewood, The Wolles, Crossebewghe, Donnerles, Fotton (Fulton), West Leas, Two walk mylnes (two fulling mills), Troonyhill, Dupligis".

== Structure ==
Fulton Tower is an L-plan castle

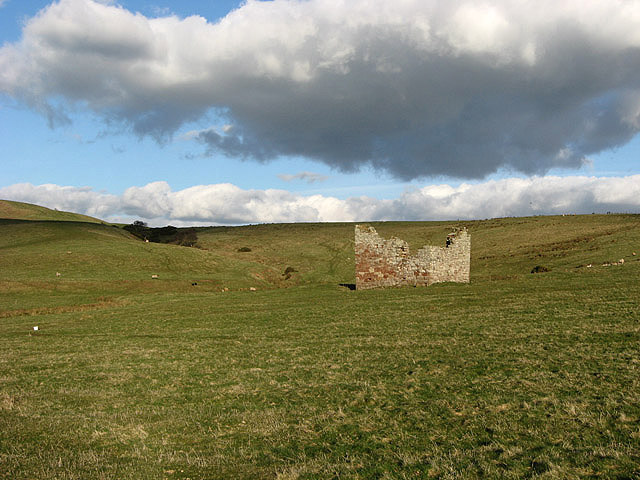

The tower is oblong but has a circular stair-tower projecting from the east angle. It measures 22.75 feet (6.93 m) from north west to south east by 30.5 feet (9.3 m) from north east to south west. The two surviving storeys, which are incomplete, are not vaulted. The south east wall has been demolished, as has most of the stair-tower. The other walls, built of roughly coursed harled rubble, remain to an average height of 18 feet (5.5 m). There is no trace of the entrance. There are two oval gunloops facing north west on the ground floor. A fireplace survives in the south west gable, while on the floor above the remains of a window facing north east can be seen, with a fireplace, with a locker in one jamb, opposite to it.

== See also ==
- Castles in Great Britain and Ireland
- List of castles in Scotland
