= Hallrule =

Village in Scottish Borders, Scotland

Coordinates: 55.4183°N 2.64427°W

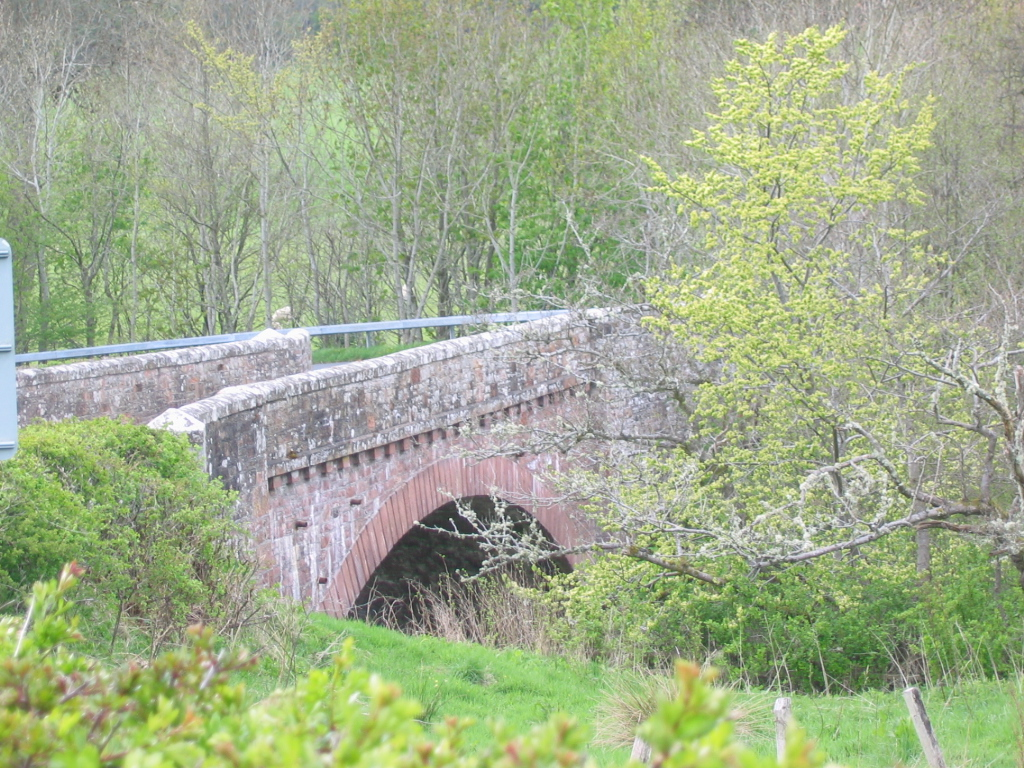
Bridge over the Rule Water at Hallrule

Hallrule is a hamlet on the B6357 road, in the Scottish Borders area of Scotland, on the Rule Water, near Abbotrule, Bedrule, Bonchester Bridge, Denholm, Hobkirk, Ruletownhead and to the south, the Wauchope Forest. It belongs to Hobkirk parish and lies in Roxburghshire (Scottish Gaelic: Siorrachd Rosbroig).

The feudal barony of Hallrule in the Baronage of Scotland is one of the older ones, dating back to at least the early 16th century. The settlement and the possibility to accommodate important guests are far older: Edward 1st of England (Longshanks) stayed in "Rule" in 1298 after the Battle of Falkirk.

The renownedly fierce border Clan Turnbull had its seat around Rule, mainly in Bedrule with further lands in Wells and the hamlet of Hallrule Mill as well as in Hallrule itself. The village's name in 1502 was Hawroull, however, earlier recordings suggest the main town in the area to have been "Rule", probably located at the site of today's Town-o Rule-farm. The fortified Tower house "Hallrule Tower" was held by George Turnbull. It was burned in 1523 and again in 1544 by the army of Lord Hertford.

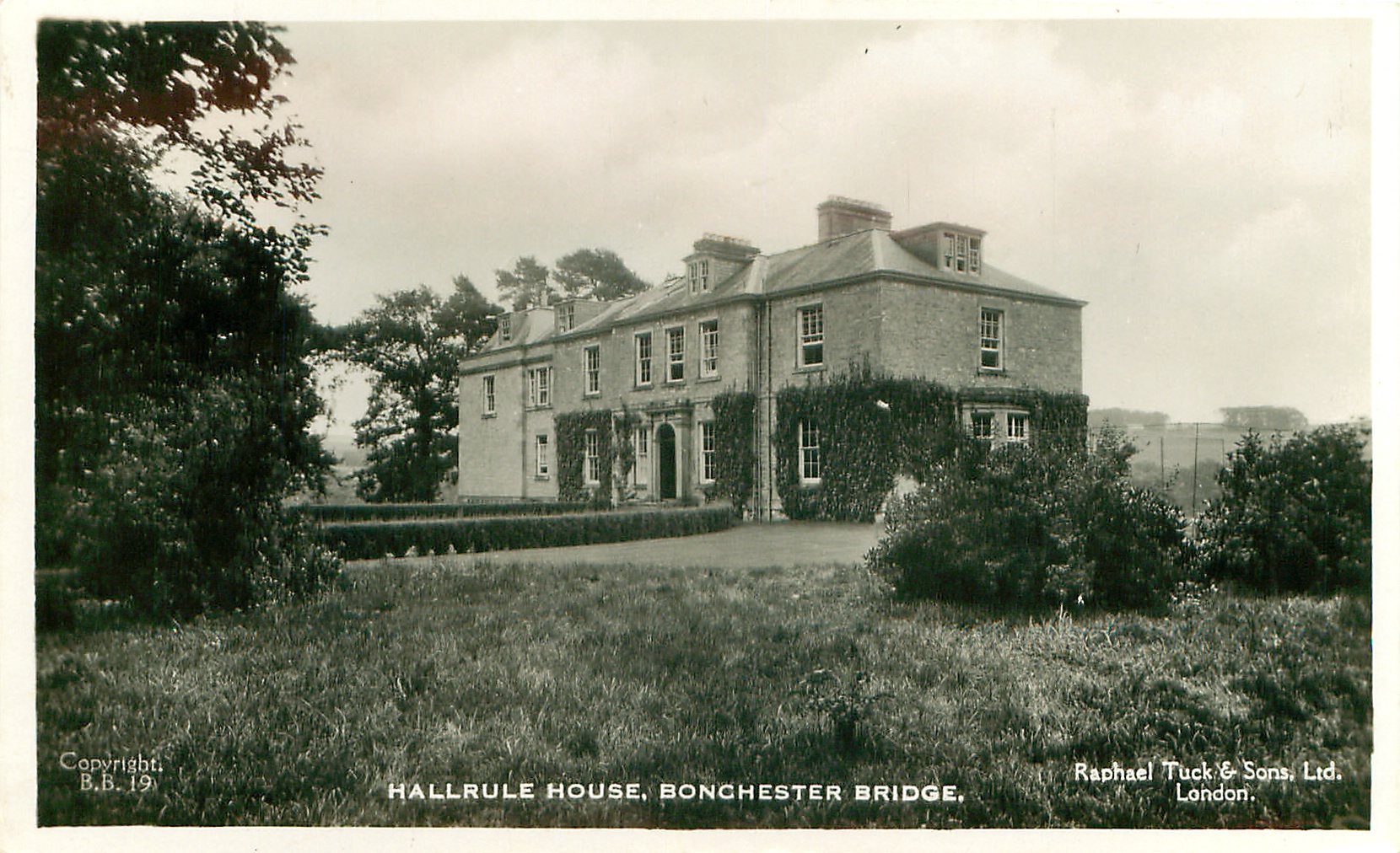
Hallrule manor house

Hallrule is a name associated with Border Collie and Rough Collie breeding, Hemp of Hallrule being a well-known name in Border Collie pedigrees. The nearby manorial Hallrule House, dating to the early 1800s, was the seat of Sir Robert Usher, owner of the Hallrule and Wells estates. It became the home of Sir Stuart Usher and his family in 1950 until the house of Usher had to sell it in 1995.

Hallrule farm, now a holiday site as well as farming venison, was also the site of a burial cairn, indicating a prehistoric settlement around Hallrule but removed in the 19th century. Prehistoric occupation of the area is also suggested by the proximity of the Bonchester hillfort.

== See also ==
- List of places in the Scottish Borders
- List of places in Scotland
- List of Scottish feudal baronies
