= William Veitch =

Scottish classical scholar

William Veitch LL.D. (1794–1885) was a Scottish classical scholar.

== Life ==
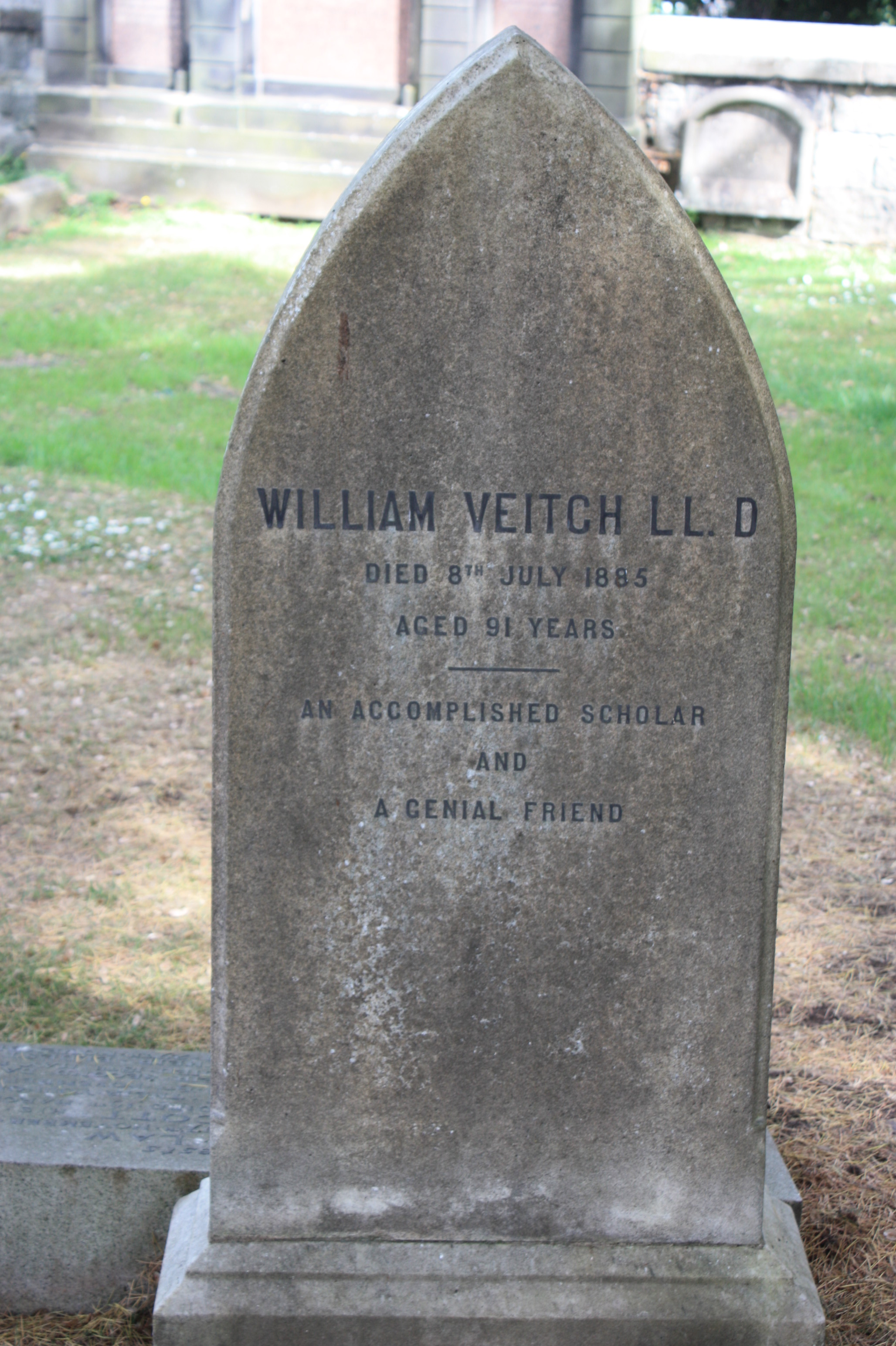
The grave of William Veitch, Dean Cemetery, Edinburgh

He was born in Spittal-on-Rule in Roxburghshire, his family being one of the three main farming families in the area. He attended school in Jedburgh then went to Edinburgh University to study divinity alongside Edward Irving. He received a licence to preach and did so until the Disruption of 1843. However, his great love was in scholastic study. In 1851 he stood unsuccessfully for the Greek chair at Edinburgh University, losing to John Stuart Blackie.

In 1866 he received an honorary doctorate (LLD) from his alma mater, recognising his contributions to scholastic literature. He rented rooms in Edinburgh and had a holiday cottage in Langton to the south.

He died on 8 July 1885. He is buried in a southern section of Dean Cemetery in western Edinburgh. He never married and had no children.

== Artistic recognition ==
His portrait by James Irvine is held by the Scottish National Portrait Gallery.

== Publications ==
- Greek Verbs, Irregular and Defective. Oxford, 1848 ; 1866^{2} ; 1871^{3} ; 1879^{4} ; 1887 . Repr. (1887 ed.) Hildesheim: Georg Olms, 1967
- Greek Lexicon
- Latin-English Dictionary (with Smith)
- The Iliad (1852)
- Revision to Daniel Keyte Sandford's Extracts from Greek Authors
