= James Telfer =

Scottish poet

- Born: 3 December 1800; Southdean, Roxburghshire
- Died: 18 January 1862 (aged 61)
- Occupation: Poet

James Telfer (3 December 1800 – 18 January 1862) was a Scottish poet.

== Biography ==
Telfer was the son of Isabella and John Telfer who was a shepherd. James was born in the parish of Southdean, Roxburghshire, on 3 December 1800. He at first followed his father's career but he gradually educated himself to become a schoolmaster. He taught first at Castleton, Langholm, Dumfriesshire, and then for twenty-five years conducted a small adventure school at Saughtrees, Liddisdale, Roxburghshire. On a very limited income he supported a wife and three daughters, and found leisure for literary work. He was an admirer and imitator of James Hogg, the Ettrick Shepherd, who befriended him. As a writer of the archaic and quaint ballad style illustrated in Hogg's ‘Queen's Wake,’ Telfer eventually attained a measure of ease and even elegance in composition, and in 1824 he published a volume entitled ‘Border Ballads and Miscellaneous Poems.’ The ballad, ‘The Gloamyne Buchte,’ descriptive of the potent influence of fairy song, is a skilful development of a happy conception. Telfer contributed to Wilson's ‘Tales of the Borders,’ 1834, and in 1835 he published ‘Barbara Gray,’ an interesting prose tale. A selected volume of his prose and verse appeared in 1852. He died on 18 January 1862.
