= Spital =

Spital or Spittal may refer to:

== Places ==
=== Austria ===
- Spital (Weitra), a hamlet in the Waldviertel, Lower Austria, notable for being the origin of some of Adolf Hitler's family
- Spital am Pyhrn, a municipality in Upper Austria
- Spital am Semmering, a municipality in Styria, in the southeast
- Spital (Schäffern), a hamlet of the municipality of Schäffern in Styria, in the southeast
- Spittal an der Drau, a town in Carinthia, in the southwest
- Bezirk Spittal an der Drau, an administrative district (Bezirk) in the state of Carinthia, whose main city is Spittal an der Drau

=== Bermuda ===
- Spittal Pond Nature Reserve

=== United Kingdom ===
==== England ====
- Spital, Berkshire, a part of Windsor
- Spital, Derbyshire, part of Chesterfield
- Spittal, East Riding of Yorkshire, a location
- Spitalfields, an area in London
- Spital-in-the-Street, a hamlet in Lincolnshire
- Spital, Merseyside, on the Wirral Peninsula
  - Spital railway station
- Spittal, Northumberland, a seaside resort
- Spital, Tamworth, a Ward of Tamworth Borough Council
- Spital Tongues, an area of Newcastle upon Tyne
- Spital Brook, a tributary of the River Lea in Hertfordshire

==== Scotland ====
- Spittal, Auchterderran, a town in Fife
- Spittal, Dumfries and Galloway, a location
- Spittal, East Lothian
- Spittal of Glenshee in eastern Perth and Kinross
- Spittal, Highland
- Spittal, South Lanarkshire, a neighbourhood of Rutherglen
- Spittal, Kilmaronock, a location in Stirling council area
- Spittal, a part of Stirling, an historic town
- Spittal-on-Rule, Scottish Borders

==== Wales ====
- Spittal, Pembrokeshire, a village in the southwest

== Surname ==
- Hermann Josef Spital (1925–2007), bishop of Trier 1981–2001
- Charles Spittal (1874–1931), Canadian athlete and soldier
- Ian Spittal (born 1965), Scottish footballer
- Blair Spittal (born 1995), Scottish footballer
- Sir James Spittal (1769–1842), Lord Provost of Edinburgh 1833–1837

== Other uses ==
- SV Spittal, an association football club based in Spittal an der Drau, Austria

== See also ==
- Spittle (disambiguation)
