= Usher baronets =

Baronetcy in the Baronetage of the United Kingdom

The Usher baronetcy, of Norton in Ratho in the County of Midlothian, and of Wells in Hobkirk in the County of Roxburgh, is a title in the Baronetage of the United Kingdom. It was created on 29 August 1899 for John Usher, a whisky distiller and benefactor, brother of Andrew Usher (1826–1898). The brothers founded Andrew Usher & Co, and later the North British Distillery Company. John Usher was a founder of the John Usher Institute of Public Health, and of a chair in public health, at the University of Edinburgh in 1898.

== Usher baronets, of Norton and Wells (1899) ==
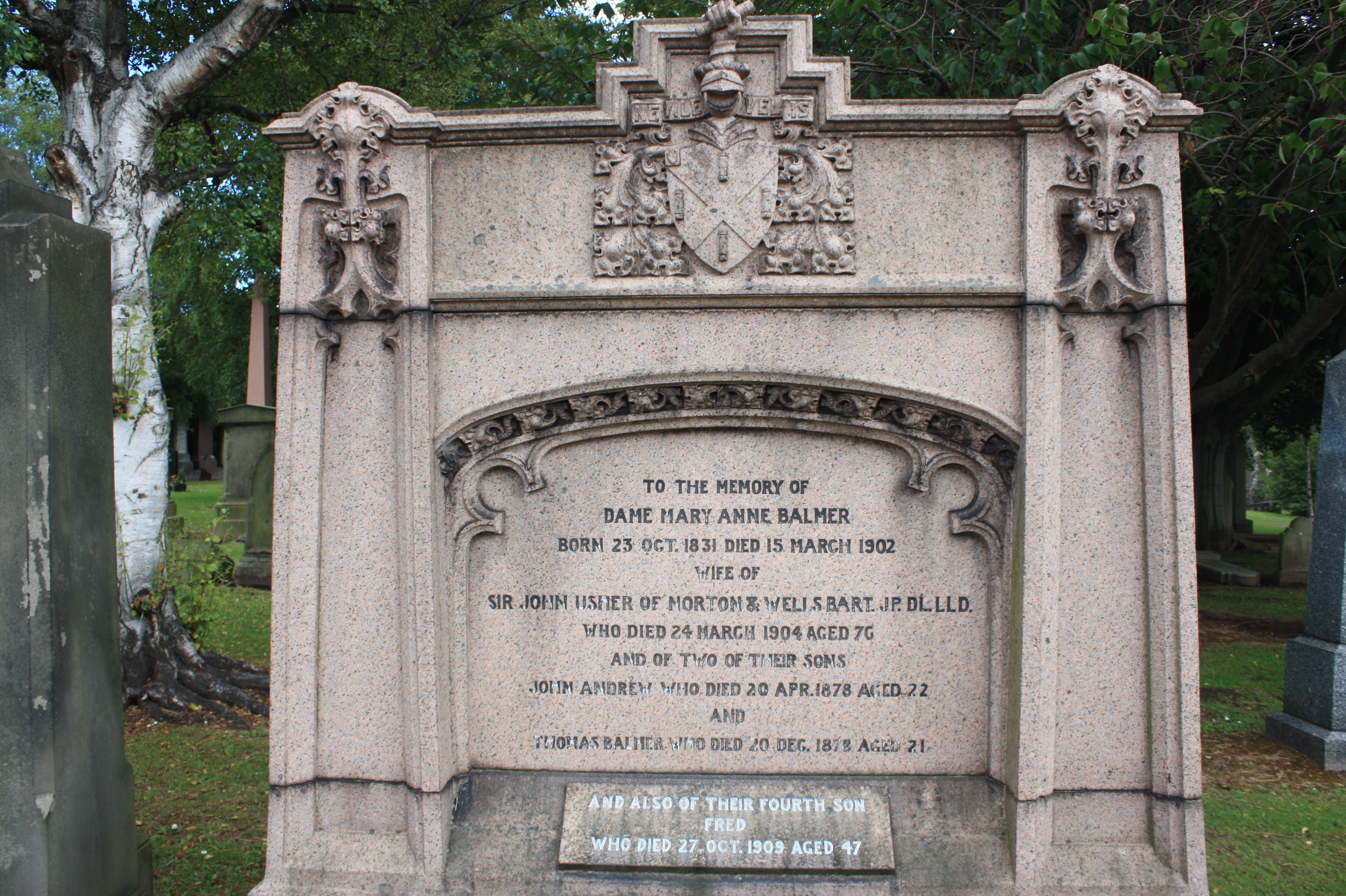
The grave of Sir John Usher, Baronet, Grange Cemetery

- Sir John Usher, 1st Baronet (1828–1904)
- Sir Robert Usher, 2nd Baronet (1860–1933)
- Sir John Turnbull Usher, 3rd Baronet (1891–1951)
- Sir Robert Stuart Usher, 4th Baronet (1898–1962)
- Sir Peter Lionel Usher, 5th Baronet (1931–1990)
- Sir Robert Edward Usher, 6th Baronet (1934–1994)
- Sir William John Tevenar Usher, 7th Baronet (1940–1998)
- Sir Andrew John Usher, 8th Baronet (born 1963)

The heir apparent to the baronetcy is Rory James Andrew Usher, eldest son of the 8th Baronet (born 1991).

== Notes ==
Baronetage of the United Kingdom
Preceded by Burdon-Sanderson baronets	Usher baronets of Norton and Wells; 29 August 1899	Succeeded by Webster baronets
