= Spittler =

Spittler is a German surname. Notable people with the surname include:

- Carl Spitteler (1845-1924), Swiss poet
- Kerstin Spittler (born 1963), East German rower
- Ludwig Timotheus Spittler (1752–1810), German historian
- Torsten Spittler (born 1962), German football manager

== See also ==
- Spitler, surname
- Spittle (surname)
