= Roxburghshire =

Coordinates: 55°30′N 2°30′W

Roxburgh
- Historic county
- Country: Scotland
- County town: Jedburgh

Area
  - Total: 666 sq mi (1,725 km^{2})
- Ranked 12th of 34
- Chapman code: ROX

Roxburghshire or the County of Roxburgh is a historic county and registration county in the Southern Uplands of Scotland. It borders Dumfriesshire to the west, Selkirkshire and Midlothian (historic) to the northwest, and Berwickshire to the north. To the southwest it borders Cumberland and to the southeast Northumberland, both in England.

It was named after the Royal Burgh of Roxburgh, a town which declined markedly in the 15th century and is no longer in existence. Latterly, the county town of Roxburghshire was Jedburgh.

The county has much the same area as Teviotdale, the basin drained by the River Teviot and tributaries, together with the adjacent stretch of the Tweed into which it flows. The term is often treated as synonymous with Roxburghshire, but may omit Liddesdale as Liddel Water drains to the west coast.

== History ==
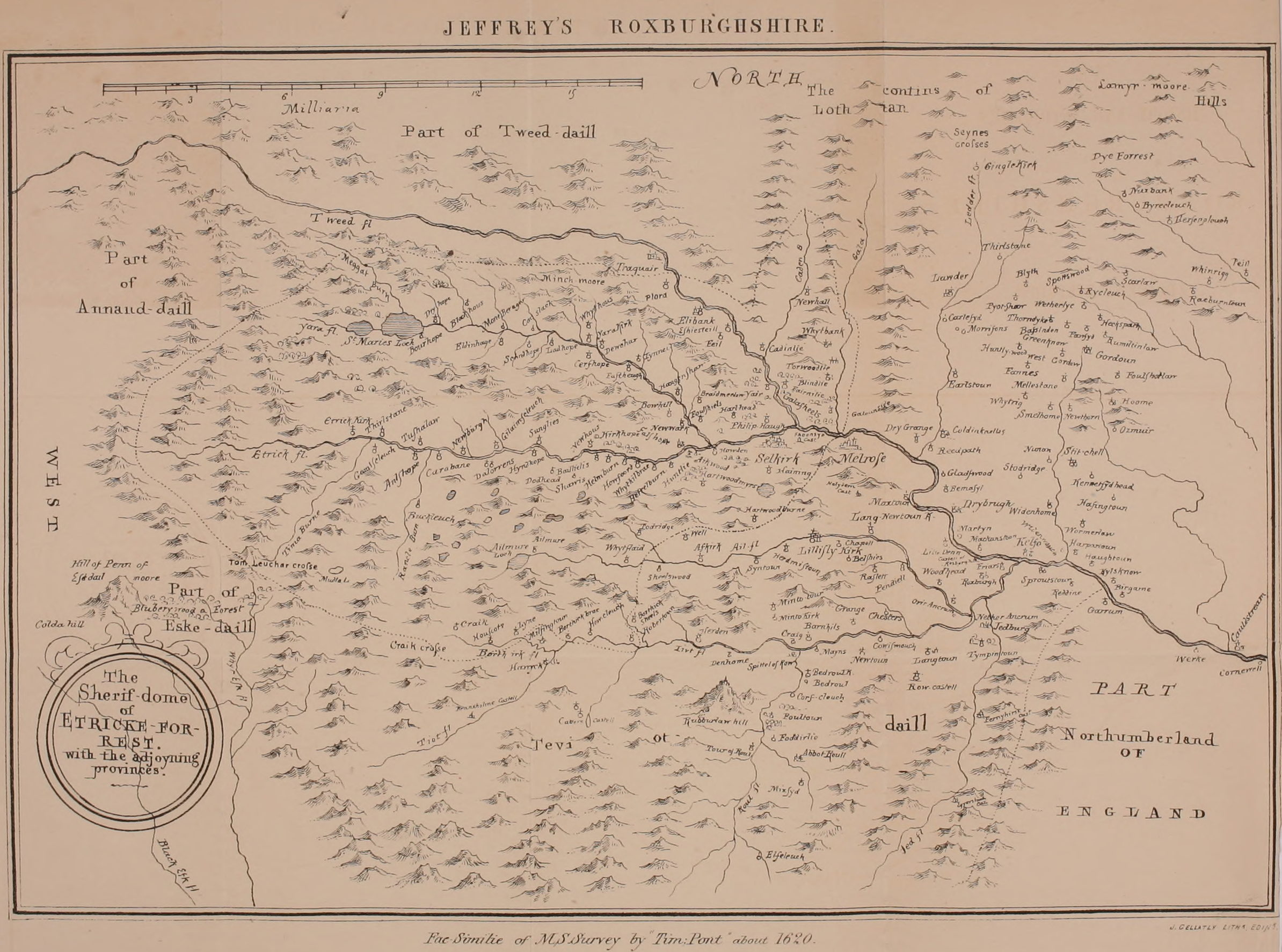
Jeffrey's Roxburghshire

The county appears to have originated in the 12th century with the creation of the sheriffdom of Roxburgh. The first known sheriff is Gospatric (sheriff of Roxburgh). The hereditary sheriffship of Roxburghshire was possessed by the family of Douglas until the abolition of heritable jurisdictions in the 18th century.

The county was constantly fought over in the Middle Ages as part of the Anglo-Scottish Wars, before the border settled into roughly its modern form with the Treaty of York in 1237. The violence and lawlessness of these times gave rise to the Border Reivers.

The ancient royal burgh of Roxburgh, from which the county had taken its name, fell into decay by the fifteenth century. After the demise of the town of Roxburgh, the county administration was based in Jedburgh, the county town. County Buildings were erected near the market place in 1812, in which the different courts met and the county officials transacted their business.

In 1855 Alexander Jeffrey published his book The history and antiquities of Roxburghshire and adjacent districts, from the most remote period to the present time. It ran to four volumes.

== Geography ==
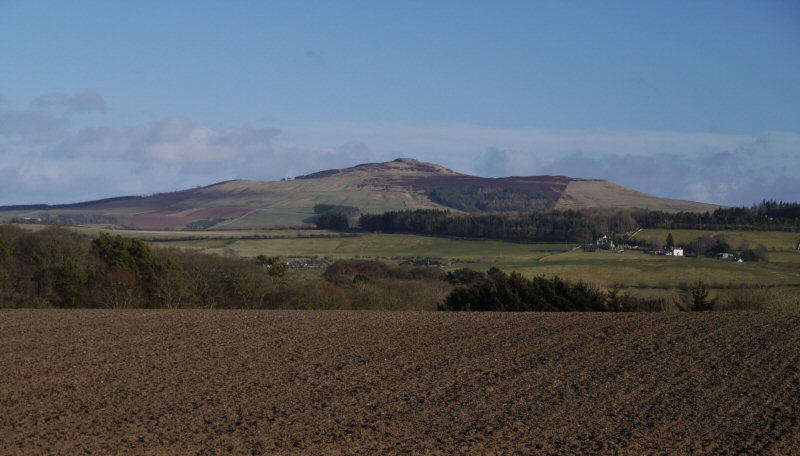
Rubers Law in central Roxburghshire

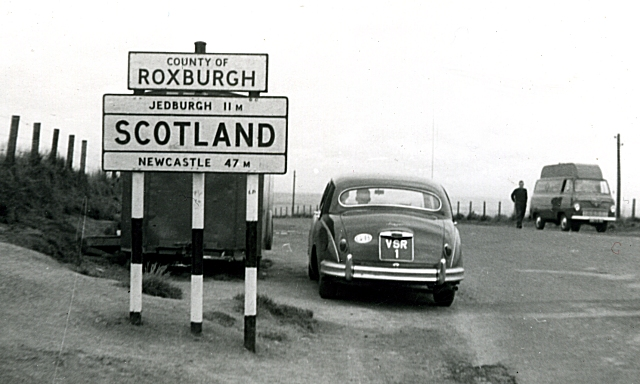
Roxburghshire sign at the border with England at Carter Bar, 1960

Roxburghshire is a predominantly rural county, consisting of low hills rising to the Cheviot Hills along the border with England. Just to the south of Melrose can be found Eildon Hill, a prominent local landmark. There are a few scattered lochs, though none of any significant size.

== Transport ==
Other than terminus of the recently re-opened Borders Railway, of which two stations (Galashiels and Tweedbank) lie within the county, there are no railways in Roxburghshire. There were formerly a number of lines serving the county, however these closed as a result of the Beeching cuts.

== Demographics ==
The county has a population of 48,639 (in 2011), which is 43% of the population of the Scottish Borders area.

Today, the main towns in the county are (population in 2011):

- Jedburgh — 4,030
- Hawick — 14,294
- Kelso — 5,639
- Melrose — 2,307

Hawick is now by far the largest town, with 29% of the county's population. More than half the population live in the two parishes of Hawick and Melrose.

== Administration ==
Today, Roxburghshire is within the Scottish Borders council area for local government purposes and contains the administrative centre of the area, the small town of Newtown St Boswells. It retains official status as a registration county, and falls within the Roxburgh, Ettrick and Lauderdale lieutenancy area for ceremonial purposes.

=== County ===
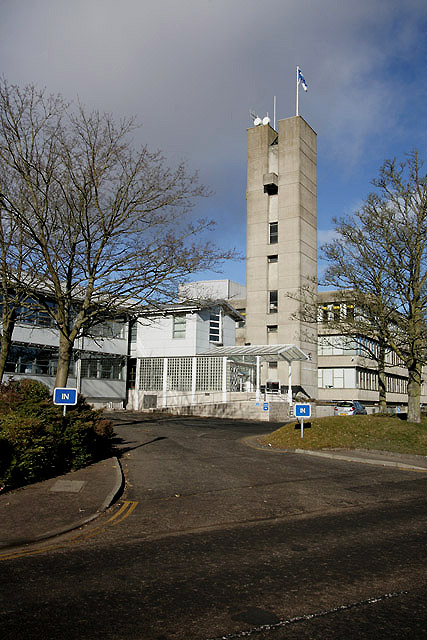
County Offices, Newtown St Boswells, the former headquarters of Roxburgh County Council

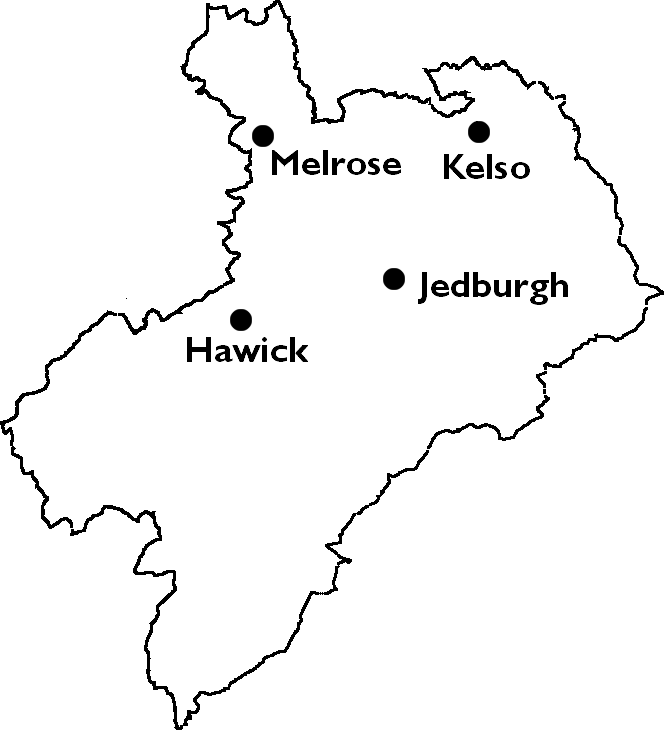
Burghs in Roxburghshire, 1975

Until 1975, Roxburghshire was used for local government. The original county town of Roxburgh was abandoned following the destruction of Roxburgh Castle in 1460 during the Anglo-Scottish Wars. Jedburgh then became the county town, serving as the location for the sheriff court and meeting place of the Commissioners of Supply, which were established in 1667 as the county's main administrative body. The County Buildings on Castlegate in Jedburgh were built in 1812 to hold the sheriff court and be the meeting place for the commissioners.

The county council was created in 1890, taking most of the commissioners' functions. From 1890 until 1930 the council met at the County Buildings in Jedburgh. In 1930 the council moved its meeting place and headquarters to Newtown St Boswells. The council already had a branch office on Bowden Road in Newtown St Boswells, which it had built in 1896, and in 1930 the council inherited an adjoining building which had been built in 1928 for the short-lived Roxburghshire Education Authority. The complex became known as the County Offices. A large new building designed by Peter Womersley was added to the site in 1968.

Roxburghshire County Council was abolished in 1975, when local government in Scotland was reorganised into upper-tier regions and lower-tier districts. Roxburghshire became part of the Borders region. The County Offices at Newtown St Boswells became the headquarters for the new Borders Regional Council. The Duke of Buccleuch and the Duke of Roxburghe between them had held the convenership of Roxburgh County Council for 43 years between 1900 and 1975.

At the time of the county council's abolition in 1975, the county contained four burghs and four districts (the districts generally covering the rural areas surrounding the town after which they were named):

- Hawick Burgh
- Jedburgh Royal Burgh
- Kelso Burgh
- Melrose Burgh
- Hawick District
- Jedburgh District
- Kelso District
- Melrose District

=== District ===
Roxburgh
- District
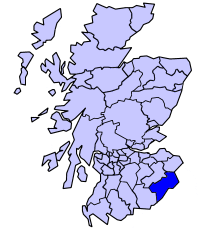
- History
  - Created: 16 May 1975
  - Abolished: 31 March 1996
  - Succeeded by: Scottish Borders
  - HQ: Hawick
- Contained within
  - Region: Borders

The Local Government (Scotland) Act 1973 abolished the county council and incorporated its area into the Borders Region. Borders was divided into four districts, one of which was named Roxburgh. Roxburgh District's borders broadly resembled those of the historic county, but included the parish of Nenthorn from Berwickshire, and excluded the parishes of Bowden, Lilliesleaf, Maxton, Melrose, and St Boswells, which went instead to the new Ettrick and Lauderdale District. For lieutenancy purposes, the last lord-lieutenant of the county of Roxburghshire was made lord-lieutenant for the district of Roxburgh when the reforms came into effect in 1975.

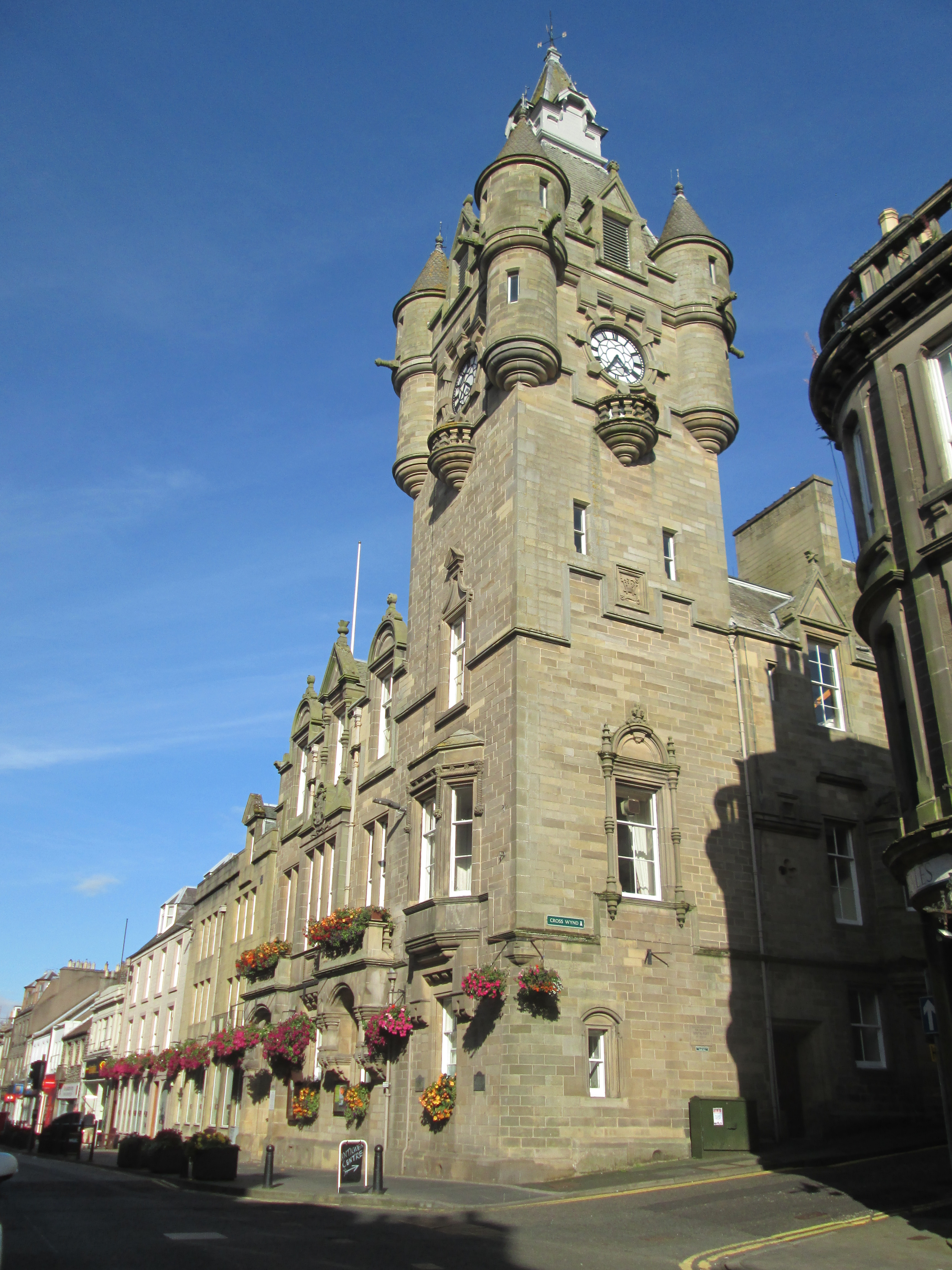
Hawick Town Hall

Roxburgh District Council was based at Hawick Town Hall which had been built in 1886 for the former Hawick Town Council.

The region and four district councils were abolished in 1996, merging to form the present Scottish Borders council area. A new lieutenancy area was created at the same time, called Roxburgh, Ettrick and Lauderdale, covering the combined area of the abolished districts of Roxburgh and neighbouring Ettrick and Lauderdale.

==== Political control ====
The first election to the district council was held in 1974, initially operating as a shadow authority alongside the outgoing authorities until it came into its powers on 16 May 1975. Political control of the council from 1975 until its abolition in 1996 was as follows:

Party in control	Years
Independent	1975–1984
No overall control	1984–1988
Independent	1988–1992
No overall control	1992–1996

=== Coat of arms ===
The County of Roxburgh was the first Scottish county to receive a grant of arms. This was made by Lord Lyon King of Arms on 9 July 1798. The coat of arms seems to have been granted for the use of the volunteer and militia units then being organised under the authority of the county's lord lieutenant. When the county council was formed in 1890, the arms passed to them.

The shield depicted a unicorn, a national symbol of Scotland. At the top of the shield was a hunting horn between two helmets: probably a reference to the border reivers, one of whom featured in the arms of the royal burgh of Jedburgh. The crest above the shield was an armoured arm brandishing a scimitar. The Latin motto was Ne Cede Malis Sed Contra Audentior Ito or Yield not to misfortunes (evil things) but go on more boldly against them., it was a quotation from Virgil's Aeneid 6, 95.

On 6 May 1975 the coat of arms was regranted to Roxburgh District Council, without the crest. When the district council was abolished in 1996, the arms reverted to The Crown.

Coat of arms of Roxburghshire County Council 1890–1962.

Coat of arms of Roxburghshire County Council 1962–1975.

Coat of arms of Roxburgh District Council 1975–1996.

=== Civil parishes ===
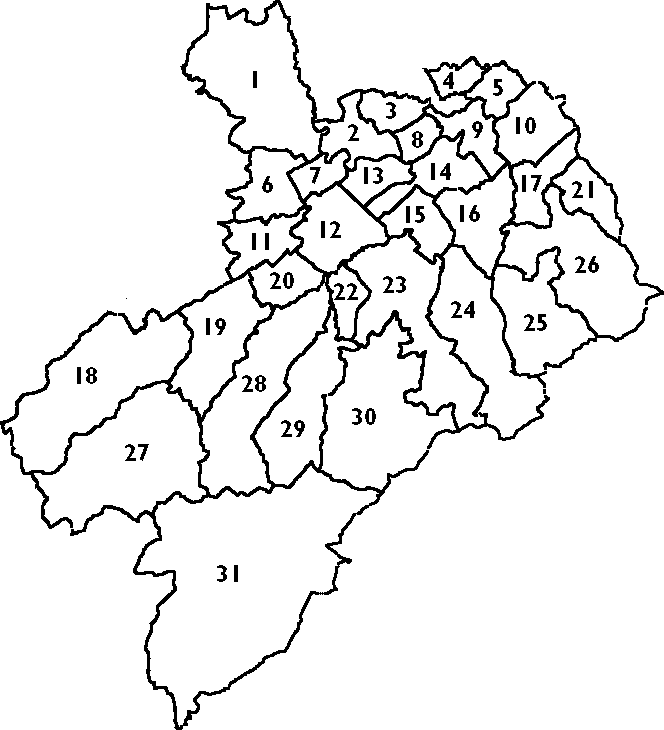
civil parishes of Roxburghshire c 1930

Following the boundary changes carried out under the Local Government (Scotland) Act 1889, the county of Roxburgh contained 30 civil parishes:

- Ancrum (No.12 on map)
- Bedrule (22)
- Bowden (6)
- Castleton aka Liddesdale (31)
- Cavers (28)
- Crailing (15)
- Eckford (16)
- Ednam (5)
- Hawick (19)
- Hobkirk (29)
- Hownam (25)
- Jedburgh (23)
- Kelso (9)
- Lilliesleaf (11)
- Linton (17)
- Makerstoun (8)
- Maxton (13)
- Melrose (1)
- Minto (20)
- Morebattle (26)
- Oxnam (24)
- Roberton (18)
- Roxburgh (14)
- Smailholm (3)
- Southdean (30)
- Sprouston (10)
- St. Boswells (7)
- Stichill (4)
- Teviothead (27)
- Yetholm (21)

==== Defunct parishes and amalgamations ====
In medieval times there were 47 parishes, making the area the most densely parished in Scotland.

- Abbotrule: divided between Bedrule and Southdean in 1806.
- Ettleton and Wheelkirk: absorbed into Castleton
- Hassendean: divided between Minto, Roberton and Wilton, 17th century.
- Jedworth, Old Jedworth and Upper Crailing: united to form the parish of Jedburgh.
- Kirkton or Cavers Parva: absorbed into Cavers in 1895.
- Lempitlaw: absorbed into Sprouston at the Reformation.
- Longnewtown: absorbed into Ancrum in 1684.
- Maxwell, Roxburgh Holy Sepulchre and Roxburgh St James: absorbed into Kelso (aka Kelso St Mary's), date unknown.
- Mow: absorbed into Morebattle in 1672.
- Nisbet and Spital: absorbed into Crailing 1606.
- Rutherford: absorbed into Maxton.
- Wilton: absorbed into Hawick post-1900.

== Settlements ==
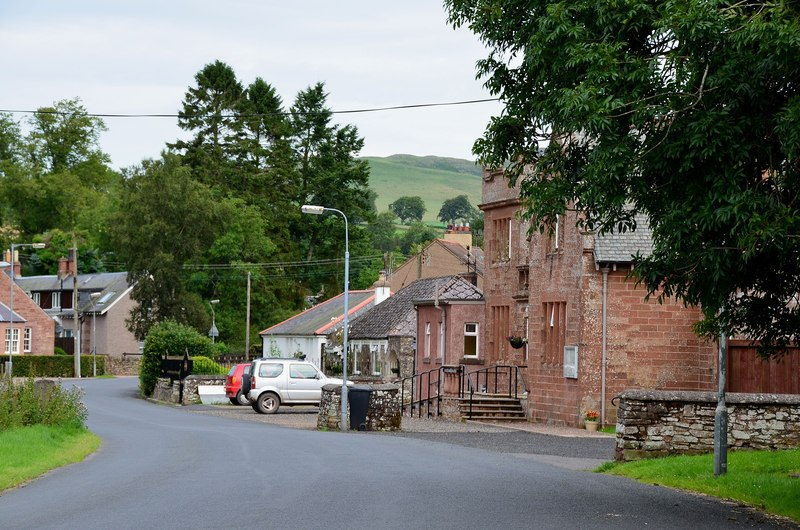
Bonchester Bridge

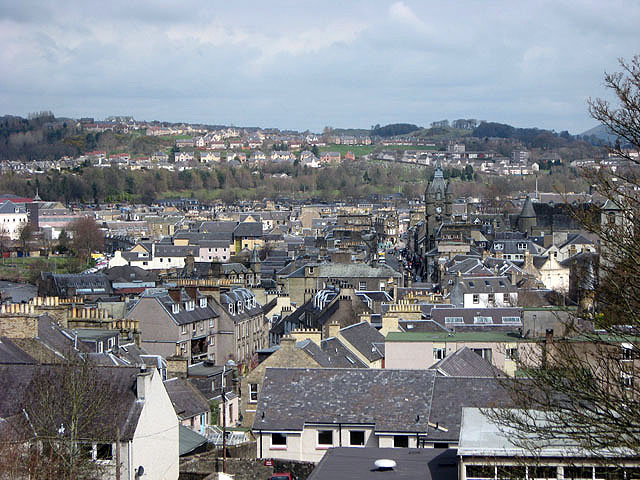
Hawick

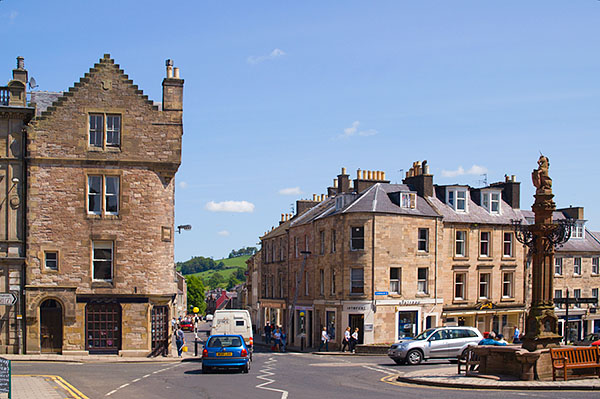
Jedburgh

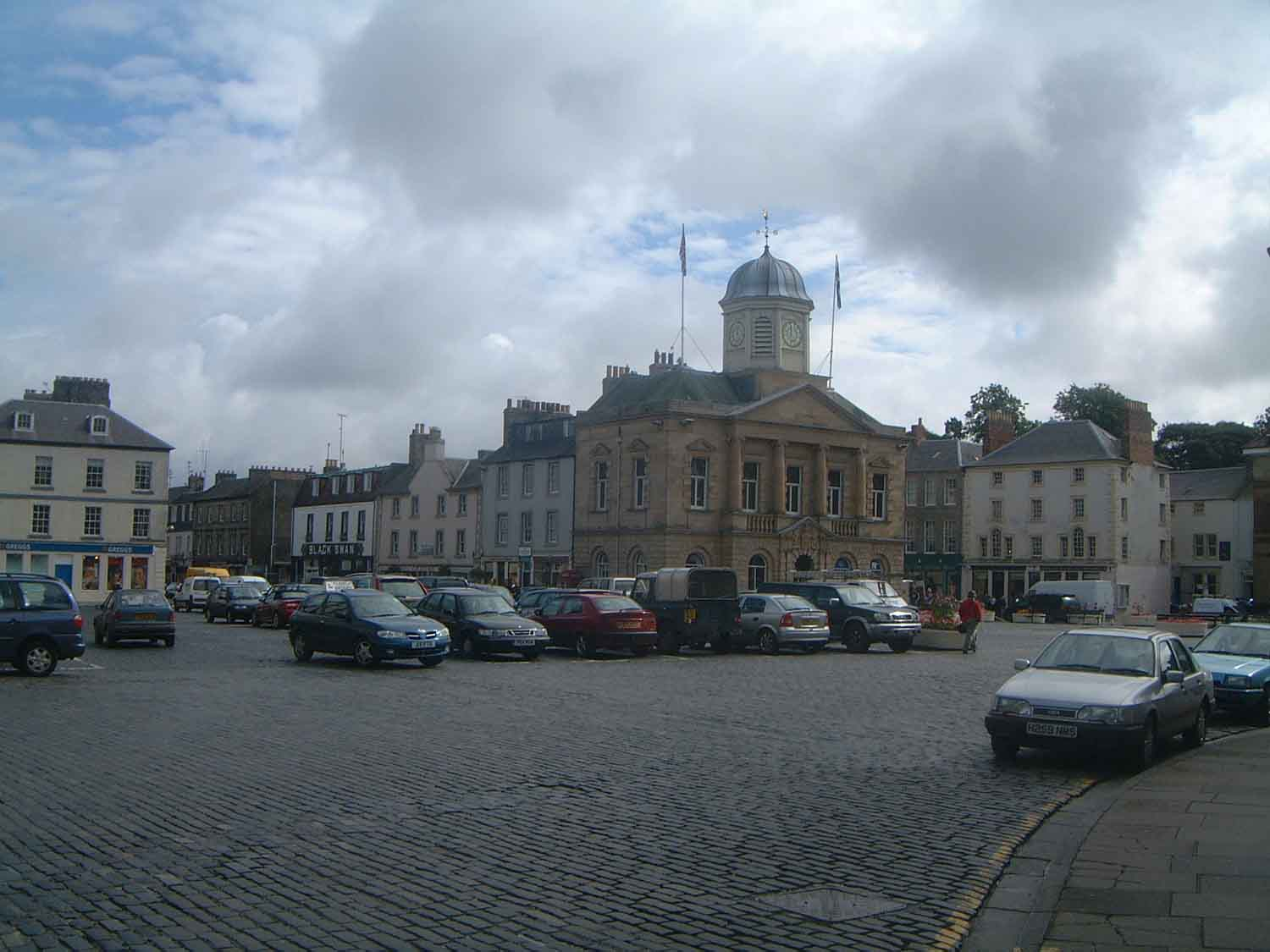
Kelso

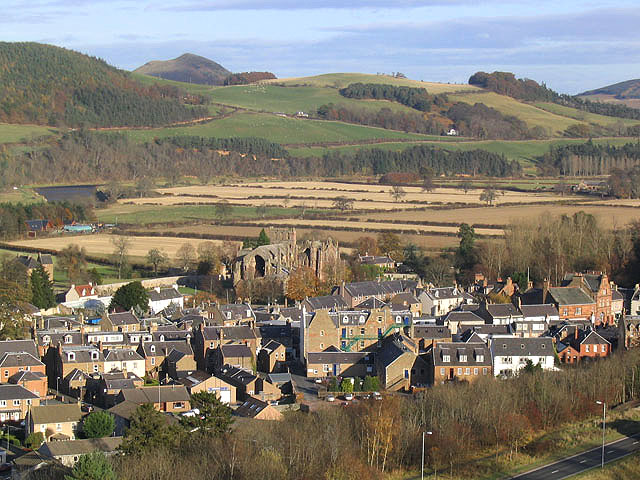
Melrose

- Abbotrule
- Ancrum
- Appletreehall
- Ashkirk
- Bairnkine
- Bedrule
- Bonchester Bridge
- Bowden
- Branxholme
- Broadhaugh
- Burnfoot
- Camptown
- Crailing
- Crailinghall
- Darnick
- Denholm
- Eckford
- Edgerston
- Ednam
- Eildon
- Galashiels (shared with Selkirkshire)
- Gattonside
- Hallrule
- Hawick
- Heiton
- Hobkirk
- Hownam
- Jedburgh
- Kelso
- Kirkton
- Kirk Yetholm
- Lempitlaw
- Lilliesleaf
- Lindean
- Linton
- Longnewton, Roxburghshire
- Maxton
- Melrose
- Midlem
- Minto
- Morebattle
- Newcastleton
- Newstead
- Newtown St Boswells
- Nisbet
- Oxnam
- Roxburgh
- St Boswells
- Smailholm
- Southdean
- Spittal-on-Rule
- Sprouston
- Stichill
- Town Yetholm
- Tweedbank
- Wilton
- Wilton Dean

== Notable residents ==
- Robert Livingston the Elder, (1654–1728), born in Ancrum, was the Secretary for Indian affairs of the New York Province and the first lord of Livingston Manor.
- Robert Kerr (1757–1813), surgeon, writer on scientific and other subjects, and translator, was born in Roxburghshire.
- Thomas Pringle the nineteenth century Scottish writer, poet and abolitionist was born at Blakelaw, a 500-acre (2.0 km^{2}) farmstead four miles (6 km) to the south of the town of Kelso where his father was the tenant.
- Henry Scott Riddell (1798–1870), the poet, was buried at Teviothead and is commemorated by a monument on a nearby hill.
- "Chief" Robert Riddell (1820–1921), brother of the poet, born in Teviotdale, was a Scottish-Canadian pioneer and veteran of the Upper Canada Rebellion. He is noted for having pioneered the township of Beverly in Ontario.
- Thomas B. Scott (1829–1886), President Pro Tem of the Wisconsin State Senate.
- Sheila Anderson-Hardy (b. 1956), artist textile designer and illustrator, has lived on a farm near Jedburgh since 2014.

== See also ==
- List of places in the Scottish Borders
