= Bedrule Castle =

Scottish castle

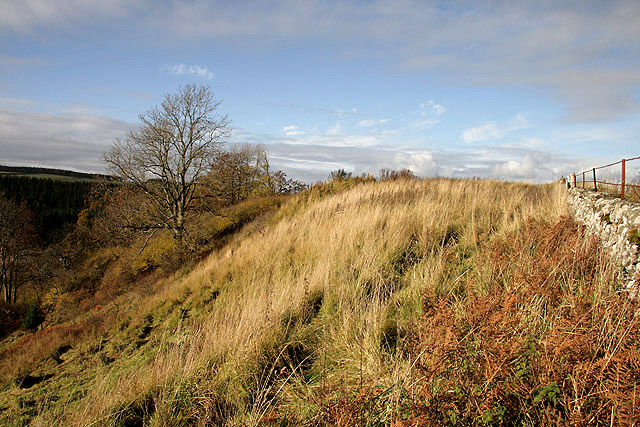
- The site of Bedrule Castle in Roxburghshire

- Location of Bedrule Castle in The Scottish Borders
- 55.4547°N 2.6369°W
- Location: Scottish Borders, Scotland

Bedrule Castle is a ruined 13th-century castle in the Rule Valley, in the Scottish Borders.

The castle was built in the 13th century by the Comyn family. During the 1st Wars of Scottish Independence Edward I of England (Longshanks) stayed one night in "Rule" on the 30th of September 1298. This was after the Battle of Falkirk and the follow-up actions of the English army during August 1298 in Ayrshire and Dumfriesshire. He had spent September resting and resupplying in friendly Carlisle and was on his way to besiege Jedburgh castle which surrendered on the 17th of October 1298.[1]

On the forfeiting of the Comyn lands in 1306, the castle passed to the Douglas family. The Douglases made the Turnbull family their tenants.

== Bedrule and the Turnbulls at war ==
On 8 November 1511, James IV of Scotland came to do justice in the Rule Valley. He captured several leading members of the Turnbull family and took them to Jedburgh. They submitted to the king with naked swords in their hands and withies about their neck. They were sent as prisoners to be warded in distant castles. In 1516, the Turnbulls joined Lord Home to rebel against Regent Albany.

The young James V issued a remission or pardon in November 1516 which names several members of the Turnbull family.

In July 1544, during the war now known as the Rough Wooing, Bedrule and 15 or 16 other steads or farms were burnt by Master Clefforth and English soldiers with men from Tynedale and Redesdale. The raiding party took 300 cattle and 600 sheep from the Rule valley and captured three field cannon called "basses" from the Laird of Ferniehirst.

On 16 September 1545, Bedrule Castle was attacked by the English again, as a response to the Scottish victory at the battle of Ancrum Moor back in February 1545. Lord Hertford reported that "I sent forth a good band to the number of 1500 light horsemen in the leading of me [and] Sir Robert Bowes, with from 5 a.m. till 3 p.m., forayed along the waters of Tyvyote and Rowle, 6 or 7 miles beyond Jedburgh, and burnt 14 or 15 towns and a great quantity of all kinds of corn". A list of burnt places includes, "Rowle, Spittel, Bedrowle, Rowlewood, Wolles, Crossebewghe, Donnerles, Fotton (Fulton Tower), West Leas", with two walk mills for fulling cloth, and "Tromyhill" and Dupligis".

After the Rising of the North in England, in January 1570 Catholic fugitives were welcomed by Thomas Turnbull at Bedrule, including Tristram Fenwyk, Robert Shafto, and Thomas Ogle. An English agent, Robert Constable, met Turnbull and Fenwick by chance in the night, and Turnbull said he was welcome at Bedrule, thinking he was also a fugitive.

"Bedrowell, a howse of Sir Andrew Trumble" (Andrew Turnbull), was burnt again by an English army commanded by the Earl of Sussex on 19 April 1570, during the Marian Civil War. Lord Hunsdon wrote, "we burnt also Bedrowle, which was the first house that Leonard Dacres took for his succor, when he fled out of England". Elizabeth I and her ministers claimed that this invasion was not an intervention of behalf of the infant James VI against Mary, Queen of Scots, but only a raid to punish and capture English border outlaws and fugitives and those who received them.

The Turnbulls themselves were supporters of Regent Lennox and his grandson James VI. On 29 August 1571 the Laird of Bedrule (Thomas Turnbull) and his son (William), with many other lairds, were declared forfeited for treason by the supporters of Mary, Queen of Scots. In February 1572 Thomas Turnbull signed a band at Jedburgh to join with other lairds to support James VI and keep order on the English border, and resist the king's enemies, especially Thomas Kerr of Ferniehirst. The later historian David Hume of Godscroft describes how the Hume lairds met the Earl of Morton at Leith, and were reluctant to sign a band to join with the lawless and notorious Turnbulls of Bedrule. Soon after, the Turnbulls ransacked the house of Robert Ker of Woodhead at Ancrum and carried off his household goods, clothes, and farmstock.

In November 1572 Thomas Turnbull attended the convention at Edinburgh when the Earl of Morton was elected as Regent. Andrew Turnbull of Bedrule was involved in the Raid of the Redeswire in 1575, and Hunsdon requested he be sent into England as a pledge or hostage for the English prisoners held by Regent Morton at Dalkeith Palace. During the struggle at Redeswire, his companion, Robert Shafto, an English follower of the rebel Earl of Northumberland, was shot dead.

For a time the Turnbull family lost Bedrule. In May 1594 Harry Home of Coldenknowes sold the Castle and its lands back to Walter Turnbull and his son William Turnbull.

== Archaeology ==
Today, the site of Bedrule castle has been reduced to a series of grassy mounds with protruding stones. Bedrule Castle was built atop a partially artificial mound, which provided it an advantageous defensive position with a sweeping view of the surrounding countryside. Rule Water runs along the western side of the bluff that the Castle was built on, and the parish church is located 200 yards southeast of the site of Bedrule Castle.

The entrance to Bedrule Castle was located on the northwest side of the site, and the entrance seems to have been protected by two towered gatehouses. When the castle was built in the 13th century by the Comyn family, it was likely surrounded by an oval-shaped curtain wall, which would have also contained houses and smaller enclosures. The curtain wall would have measured 200 meet from northeast to southeast, and 130 feet across transversely. On the southeast end of the Castle there would have been a circular tower, as well as two intermediate circular towers to the Castle's west and southwest. These towers would have made up the Castle's defense system. It is likely that there would have been two more towers on the northeastern half of the Castle corresponding to the western and southwestern towers, but they have not survived to present day.

Today, the site is unequally divided in two by a wall running northeast from the circular tower in the southwest part of the site. The castle's enclosure is incomplete, cultivation northeast of the wall has destroyed remains of the castle in that portion.

Excavations of the site were undertaken in 2021 and 2022, and geophysical surveys were undertaken in 2022. The excavations were undertaken to improve understanding of the English raid that took place in 1545 following the defeat at the Battle of Ancrum and its aftermath. Historical records indicate that at least four dozen towers and castles in Rule Valley were destroyed in this raid, and Bedrule Castle was the largest of these buildings to be attacked. Bedrule Castle may not have been destroyed completely during the attack, but excavations indicate that the castle had been abandoned for good in the 16th century.

== Geophysical surveys ==
In October 2022 Rose Geophysics carried out a geophysical survey consisting of gradiometer and resistance surveys at the site of Bedrule Castle and in the adjacent field. Both survey methods detected a well-defined curvilinear feature. The location and shape of the feature are consistent with the eastern portion of Castle's enclosure earthwork, but there is no clear indication of the potential/predicted northeastern tower. A second larger, more ephemeral curving feature was also detected, and it appears to enclose the main castle earthwork. This feature may be continuation of the earthwork feature visible to the west of the wall dividing the site, but it is uncertain whether this feature was contemporary to castle or predated it.

In the area west of the wall that bisects the site several well defined rectangular features were detected. It is believed that these features are the remains of the Castle's keep.

A series of magnetic and resistance anomalies detected in northern part of the survey area suggest the possible presence of structural remains or walled enclosures that were later added to the larger outer enclosure wall.

In the southern half of the eastern field a higher level of background resistance was observed. Within this area of higher resistance, there were several areas with well defined areas of high resistance, though the source of this resistance is unclear. It is possible that this resistance is a result of rubble spreads or structural remains, but it is uncertain if these would have been contemporary to the Castle or part of an earlier earthwork.

In the southern part of the survey area a series of linear trends were detected, possibly indicating the presence of drainage features or trackways. The period that these features date to is unknown.

== Excavation ==
Two seasons of excavations have occurred at Bedrule Castle, one in November 2021 and one taking place from September to October 2022. These excavations were undertaken as part of the Twelve Towers of Rule project, which has been ongoing since 2020 through Archaeology Scotland's Adopt-a-Monument scheme. Excavation was undertaken in partnership with the campaign for the Scottish Borders National Park. Excavations were carried out by teams of volunteers, students, and local young people. The archaeological investigations of Bedrule Castle were undertaken A total of five trenches have been excavated at site of the Castle. Further excavation has been planned for the 2024 dig season, which will take place from August to September 2024.

=== Trench 1 ===
Trench 1 measures 1x6.5 metres and is positioned along the curvilinear bank that runs from the southeast to the northwest. Excavations in Trench 1 revealed a series of linear arrangements of stones in the northeast and northwest, which are possibly the remains of tumbled walls. Due to time constraints, no conclusive evidence confirming the nature of the feature was found, and the trench was not excavated to natural subsoil or bedrock.

=== Trench 2 ===
Trench 2 was excavated in 2021 and focused on the southwest corner of a square shaped earthwork feature, which archaeologist generally interpret as being the remains of the Castle's keep. In 2022 the excavation of Trench 2 continued and the trench was extended 2 metres to the northwest, resulting in a trench measuring 4x2 metres. The topsoil was removed and an area of stone with a mix of tumbled material. Additionally, the remains of two unmortared masonry walls were revealed. These walls were each about two metres thick and made up the southwest corner of the Castle. There is evidence of stone robbing, and many of the cut stones from the Castle, such as facing stones from walls, flagstones from the floors, or lintels from doors and windows were reused in the nearby church and manse, as well as some dykes in the surrounding area. Soil deposits within the structure suggest that the destruction of at least one part of the Castle was followed by a period of abandonment. This period of abandonment would have allowed the buildup of soils prior to the collapse of the walls.

=== Trench 3 ===
Trench 3 measured 3x2 metres and ran northwest to southeast across a raised earthwork feature. Trench 3 ran northwest to southeast, across a raised earthwork feature with some exposed stones on its surface. Due to time constraints, the trench was not excavated down to natural subsoil. Nevertheless, excavation allowed the features to be revealed and recorded. A series of rubble layers were revealed, as well as a linear arrangement of irregular stones, the latter of which may be the remains of a partially collapsed wall. The excavation of the rubble layers revealed evidence that the tumbled stone had been disturbed after the castle had been destroyed or fallen out of use. These disturbances were most likely the result of locals scavenging for cut stone to reuse in other structures.

=== Trench 4 ===
Trench 4 measured 2x4 metres and ran across the space between two small banks on the northeastern corner of the Castle. Trench 4 was not fully excavated, but it did reveal archeological features which were recorded. A rough cobbled surface overlaid by a layer of gravel clay was uncovered, which may be the remains of the entryway into a large tower. Additionally, several sherds of post-medieval pottery were found.

=== Trench 5 ===
Trench 5 measured 5.5x1 metres and ran across the southern wall of another square shaped feature located within the curtain walls. The stonework was found to be part of a 1.8 metre thick wall, which has been interpreted as being part of the early fourteenth century phase of the Castle. Further excavation of the exterior of the wall revealed large facing stones. It was found that these facing stones were the remains of the initial phase of the wall and likely dated from the mid to late thirteenth century.
