= David Dickson (surgeon) =

Scottish naval surgeon

David James Hamilton Dickson
- Born: 1780; Bedrule
- Died: 1850 (aged 69–70); Plymouth
- Other names: Sir David Dickson
- Occupation: British naval surgeon

Sir David James Hamilton Dickson OSV FRSE FRCSE FRCPE FLS (1780–1850) was a Scottish naval surgeon, medical author and amateur botanist, serving during the Napoleonic Wars and War of 1812 between Britain and the United States.

He was present as senior Physician looking after the British naval forces under Sir Alexander Cochrane at the Battle of New Orleans in 1815.

== Life ==
He was born in the manse Bedrule in the Scottish Borders in 1780, being the son of the local minister, Rev George Dickson. He was educated locally then studied medicine at Aberdeen University. He received a licence to practice medicine from the Royal College of Physicians of Edinburgh in 1798.

He joined the Royal Navy in 1799 as Britain's war with France began to escalate. Initially he served in Holland and in 1801 was posted to Egypt. He was later present at the capture of the French and Dutch islands in the West Indies. In 1806 he was formally accepted as a full doctor (MD) and became Physician and Inspector of Ships and Hospitals on the Leeward Islands in the West Indies, where he was at that time serving. On return to Britain in 1813 he was appointed Superintendent (of medical matters) to the Russian Fleet in Medway whilst also being official Physician to the British Mediterranean Fleet (a critical role at this period). The Czar of Russia awarded him the Order of St Vladimir for his contribution. In 1814 he requested a transfer from the Mediterranean to the very different climate of Halifax, Nova Scotia. In 1824 he became senior Physician at the Royal Naval Hospital in Plymouth, concurrently being Inspector of Hospitals and Fleets to the entire Royal Navy. His lifelong interest in botany led to his being elected a Fellow of the Linnean Society. He was elected a Fellow of the Royal Society of Edinburgh in 1817. His proposers were Sir William Arbuthnot, James Russell, and James Hamilton. He was knighted by King William IV on 20 August 1834.

In 1840, he is listed as one of the two senior Physicians out of a total of ten at the main naval hospital in Plymouth. Upon retiral from the Royal Navy (c.1841) he became a physician in Clifton, Bristol. He is thought to have fully retired around 1845 and returned to Plymouth where many of his naval friends and colleagues remained. In this period he seems to have been much responsible for the improvement of the Naval Library in Plymouth.

He died at Lower Durnford Street in Stonehouse, Plymouth, the main English naval port, on 2 January 1850. His will is held by the National Archives at Kew.

== Family ==
His third daughter, Ann Rose Honour Dickson, married Rev. James Jubilee Reynolds, author of Confessions of a Pencil Case, in 1859 and did much "missionary work" to promote the integration of Jews into East End London society. She died in 1887.

Dickson's son, Rev G D W Dickson MA, married Eliza Bennett Hunt in February 1861.
