= Bonchester cheese =

Scottish gastronomical specialty

Bonchester
- Country of origin: Scotland
- Region: Roxburghshire
- Town: Bonchester Bridge
- Source of milk: Jersey cows
- Pasteurised: No
- Named after: Bonchester Bridge

Bonchester cheese is a soft Scottish cheese, made from unpasteurised Jersey cows' milk. It is produced at Bonchester Bridge, Roxburghshire.

During production, the cheese develops a white rind.

Its production in Europe is regulated under protected designation of origin laws.

== See also ==
- List of British Cheeses
