= Cavers, Scottish Borders =

Coordinates: 55.432453°N 2.7273144°W

Cavers
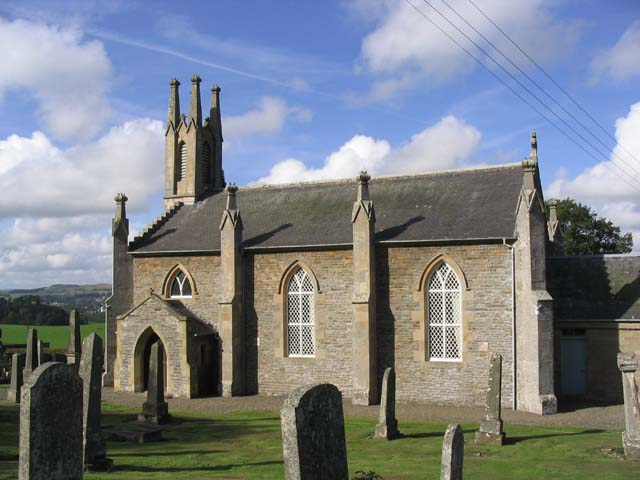
- Cavers Church

- Location within the Scottish Borders
- Population: 1,085
- OS grid reference: NT5407415636
- Council area: Scottish Borders
- Lieutenancy area: Roxburgh, Ettrick and Lauderdale
- Country: Scotland
- Sovereign state: United Kingdom
- Post town: Hawick
- Postcode district: TD9
- Dialling code: 01450
- Police: Scotland
- Fire: Scottish
- Ambulance: Scottish
- UK Parliament: Berwickshire, Roxburgh and Selkirk
- Scottish Parliament: Ettrick, Roxburgh and Berwickshire

Cavers is a parish in the Scottish Borders area of Scotland, in the former county of Roxburghshire, south and east of Hawick. The largest village in the parish is Denholm.

The name means "enclosure".

== History ==
Robert The Bruce rewarded ‘The Good’ Sir James Douglas with lands spread across Scotland. The Emerald Charter of 1320 does not mention Cavers, although is commonly assumed to include it. Sir James had been Bruce's trusted lieutenant at Bannockburn in 1314, and was key to his power base in southern Scotland.

The lands were controlled by James, 2nd Earl of Douglas in right of his wife, and he, like so many other Douglases, was not to die in his bed, but on the field of battle, at Otterburn in 1388. James's sons and (a) daughter(s) were all illegitimate. To ensure their succession, he granted the lands of Drumlanrig (see Marquess of Queensberry) to his bastard son William and it is assumed that Cavers was granted to Archibald, but this happened several years after James' death.

Cavers remained in Douglas hands until 1878, and then through the female line until 1975 when James Palmer-Douglas moved away from Cavers and the remaining lands of the once vast estates in Roxburghshire were put on the market, James having slowly sold off much of the estate after the death of his grandmother in 1949.

== Cavers Castle ==
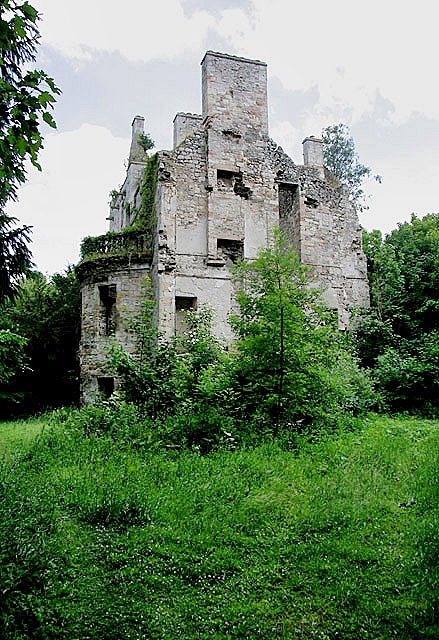
Ruins of Cavers Castle

Although little remains of the original structure, the masonry of the basement level is consistent with it being constructed in the later 15th or early 16th century as a five storey high tower, which was referred to in the 19th century as the "Warden's Tower". Although commonly said to incorporate part of a 13th-century castle this is not the case, and the stone bearing the date 1200 high up on the tower only dates to c1900.

In 12th-13th centuries the castle was possessed by the Baliols, but in 1352-3 passed to William, Lord Douglas, with the barony, by grant of Kind David II. In 1511, King James IV granted a new charter to James Douglas for the town and lands of Cavers including the castle, manor and mill. The castle in this charter probably refers to the existing tower and this is again mentioned in a charter of 1576.

The tower was subsequently modernised and the removal of a vault above the first floor in 1890 revealed a fine 13th Century piscina-niche. This feature is commonly said to be in its original position, indicating that part of the tower wall is older than the tower itself, but photographs predating the baronial works show that there was a window at this location previously. This is not a vestige of a Baliol castle, but was most likely removed from Melrose Abbey.

The upper two storeys were altered in 17th century and an extension was added to the tower on its north side from 1750, such that between 1750 and 1884 a classical mansion was formed known as Cavers House. This had a symmetrical seven bay front, which faced east and a three windowed semi-circle at the centre.

The building was remodelled in the Scottish Baronial style in 1885-7 by Kinnear and Peddie, reducing the semi-circular centre to two storeys, adding attics to the tower and north wing, and constructing a new north-west wing. However this new wing and part of the north wing were demolished in 1953.

The roof was removed in 1953, but the tower (including the 13th-century remains) and a substantial part of Cavers House still remains, up to its eaves.

== Parish Churches ==
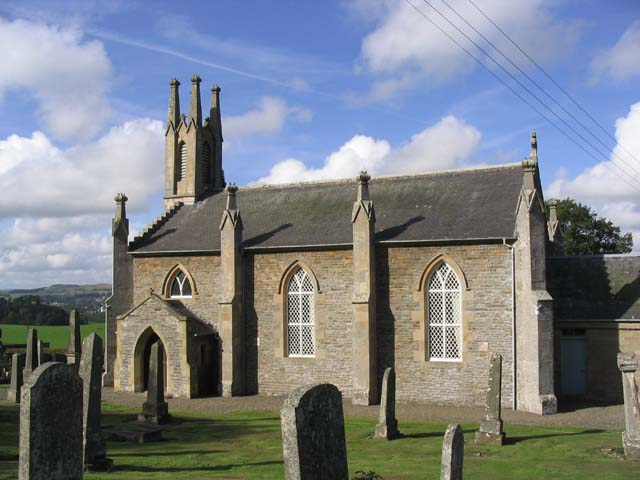
Cavers Church

The old church of Cavers (dedicated to St. Cuthbert), which dates from 12th century, was rebuilt in 1662, although parts of the east gable, north wall and north-west corner survived from the original building. The church stands within the grounds of Cavers House.

This church building was superseded by a modern church in 1822, although the old church was used as a parochial hall into the 20th century.

Kirkton Church, built in 1841, is a simple but well-proportioned church standing on an elevated site near the north-eastern boundary of the old parish of Kirkton. It is a conspicuous feature in the landscape. It replaced an older church of unknown date which had become dilapidated.

Currently, the Church of Scotland parish comprises Cavers and Kirkton linked with Hawick.

== Denholm ==
Denholm was and is the only village in the civil parish of Cavers and is situated in the north-east corner of the parish.

== History of the parish ==
The parish of Cavers corresponded exactly or closely to the barony of the same name. A barony in later medieval Scotland was a common franchise, increasingly defined as an estate to which specific ‘baronial’ powers attached. In general the barons had essentially the same criminal and civil jurisdiction within their barony as the sheriffs had within the sheriffdom. This Barony together with the lands of Cavers, and also the hereditary sheriffship of Roxburghshire, were possessed by the family of Douglas from the early 15th century until the abolition of heritable jurisdictions in the 18th century. In 1325 Robert I bestowed on the Sir James Douglas many lands, erecting the whole into a regality. The charter, by which the king made the grant is called the " Emerald Charter", but does not mention Cavers, which probably passed to the Earl of Mar, Bruce's brother-in-law as the Countess of Mar was the individual who made the first grant of Cavers to her nephew, Archibald Douglas, in the reign of King Robert III.

Parishes of Cavers and Kirkton, 1895 (parish boundary shown in blue)

Originally the parish of Cavers was very irregular in shape, being almost cut in two by the parish of Kirkton

The parish of Kirkton was bounded by the parishes of Hawick and Teviothead in the west and by Cavers on all the other sides. It had a length of 8½ miles, from north-east to south-west, and its width (east-west) varied from half a mile to almost two miles. The Kirk of Kirkton was in the north–east and Stobs station (Waverley line) was in the south–west of the parish. Area 6,222 acres.

The two parts of the parish of Cavers were joined by a narrow strip east of Kirkton and south-west of Rubers Law. In the northern division was the village of Denholm, 5 miles north-east of Hawick, while in the southern division was Shankend station (on the Waverly Route) 7 miles south of Hawick. The parish was 13 miles long with a width varying from 4 miles to 70 yards. Area 18,352 acres

From the 19th century there was a single school board covering both parishes, which ran three schools.

In December 1894 an inquiry was held in Hawick regarding representations made by the Parochial Board of Cavers that an Order be issued under the Local Government (Scotland) Act 1889 amalgamating the Parishes of Cavers and Kirkton. Following the inquiry, the parishes were amalgamated on 15 May 1895 and a new parish council was established covering both areas.

At that time (1891 census) Kirkton had a population of 320, while Cavers had 1,211 of which 475 were in Denholm.

Civil parishes in Scotland, as units of local government, were abolished in 1929 but persist for censuses, administrative records and other purposes.

The parish of Cavers comes within the area of Denholm and District Community Council, whose area south of the Teviot lies within Cavers, except for the Bedrule area in the east. The southern less populated part of the parish comes within the Upper Teviotdale and Borthwick Water Community Council area.

The parish has a population of 1,085 (in 2011), of which 653 live in Denholm.

== See also ==
- John Leyden
- List of places in the Scottish Borders
- List of places in Scotland
