= Abbotrule =

Hamlet in Scottish Borders, Scotland

Coordinates: 55°24′30″N 2°37′03″W

- Country: Scotland
- Sovereign state: United Kingdom
- Police: Scotland
- Fire: Scottish
- Ambulance: Scottish

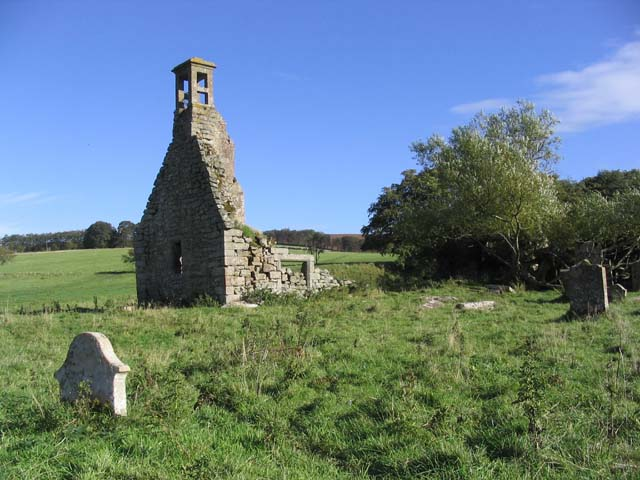
Ruins of Abbotrule Church, deroofed in the late 1770s

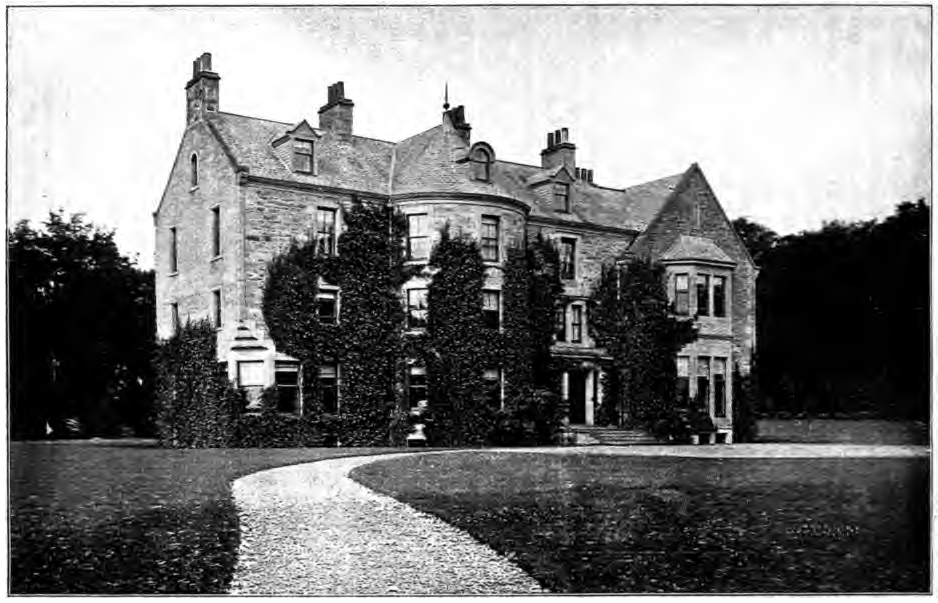
Abbotrule House, seat of the owners of Abbotrule, demolished in 1956

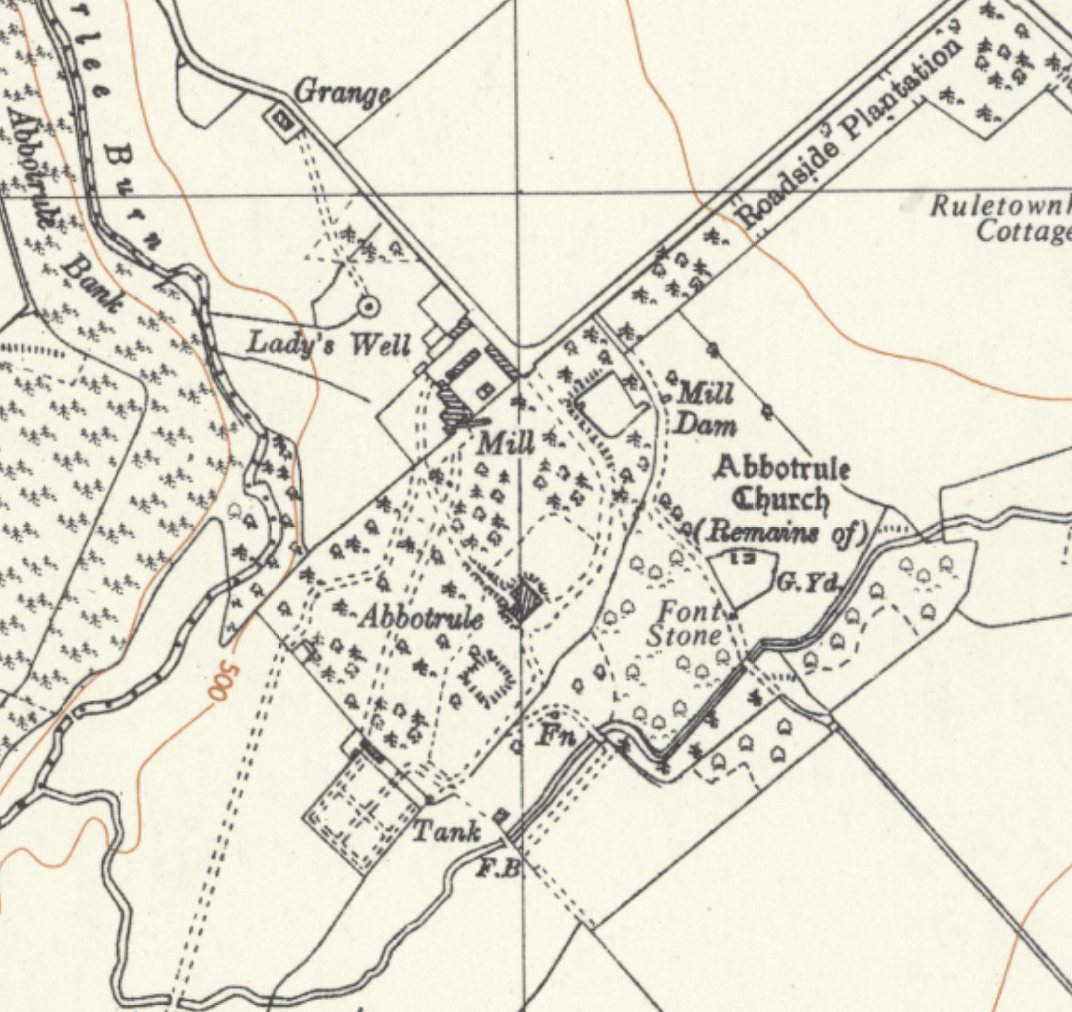
Abbotrule, depicted on a 1957 Ordnance Survey map

Abbotrule is a hamlet south of the B6357 road, in the Scottish Borders area of Scotland, on Rule Burn, east of the Rule Water. Places nearby include Bedrule, Hallrule, Spittal-on-Rule, Ruletownhead, Bonchester Bridge, Denholm, Southdean, Hobkirk, Ferniehirst Castle and the Wauchope Forest.

Abbotrule was the property of the church from the 12th-Century to 1560, and thereafter a country estate successively owned by Kerrs, Hendersons and Cunninghams. By 1956, the estate seat, Abbotrule House, had been demolished. Abbotrule was a parish until 1777, when it was divided between two other parishes; the parish church at Abbotrule was deroofed sometime shortly thereafter.

== History ==
The original name of Abbotrule is said to have been Rule Hervie before it became the property of the Church. Prior to 1135 David I of Scotland granted it to the canons of Jedburgh Abbey. About 1165 William the Lion confirmed the grant, and after this the name was changed to Abbotrule. The rectory of Abbotrule appears in Bagimonds Roll of c.1280. Abbotrule continued in the possession of the monks until the Scottish Reformation in 1560, at which time the lands and mill yielded £40 yearly.

After the Reformation the advowson was vested in the Crown, which continued as the ecclesiastical patron until the suppression of the parish in 1777 and its division between Hobkirk and Southdean parishes.

The lands of Abbotford were sold in 1569 as part of a larger transaction by Andrew Home, the commendator of Jedburgh Abbey, to Adam French, eighth laird of Thornydykes, and his wife Marmret Hoppringle, for 3,000 merk. Before 1658, the lands had passed into the possession of the William Kerr, 1st Earl of Lothian, who passed it to his son Charles, thereafter entitled Charles Kerr, first of Abbotrule. Kerrs held Abbotrule until 1818, when the land was auctioned for £35,000 plus the payment of legacies of £21,000, to Robert Henderson. In 1887, the lands passed to a cousin of the last of the Hendersons upon his death, James Cunningham, who commissioned a redesign of Abbotrule House in the period 1888 to 1890, as well as investing in the estate.

Patrick Kerr - 'a stern man, his temper not being of the best' - who inherited Abbotrule in 1791, is said to have taken a dislike to the minister of Abbotrule, and to the proximity of the church and manse to Abbotrule House. He schemed, successfully, to have the parish of Abbotford suppressed, and upon its division in 1777, caused the roof of the church to be removed and the manse demolished. He was not, however, able to prevent the churchyard being used for burials, a practice which continued for another century. The church at Abbotford was said to be in ruins by the 1880s. Abbotrule House, the estate seat, was demolished in 1956.

== See also ==
- Borders Abbeys Way
- List of places in the Scottish Borders
- List of places in Scotland
