= Wauchope Forest =

Forest in Scottish Borders, Scotland

Coordinates: 55.31938°N 2.64908°W

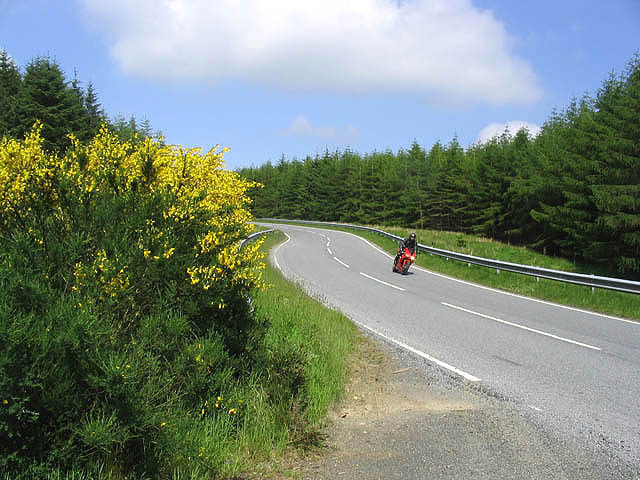
B6357 through the Wauchope Forest

Wauchope Forest is a forest on the Rule Water, in the Scottish Borders area of Scotland, south of Hawick, and including the A6088, the A68 and the B6357, as well as Newcastleton, Bonchester Bridge, Hobkirk, Southdean, Hyndlee, Carter Bar, Abbotrule, Chesters, Scottish Borders.

== See also ==
- List of places in the Scottish Borders
- List of places in Scotland
- List of places in Northumberland
