= Rule Water =

River in Scottish Borders, Scotland

Coordinates: 55°29′N 2°39′W

The Rule Water is a river in the Scottish Borders area of Scotland, and a tributary of the River Teviot. The Rule Water rises in Wauchope Forest and passes Hobkirk, Bonchester Bridge, Hallrule, Abbotrule and Bedrule until it joins the River Teviot at Spittal-on-Rule. Other placenames include the name of the Rule Water such as Ruletownhead.

== History ==
During the First War of Scottish Independence (1296-1314), Edward I of England (Longshanks) stayed one night in "Rule" on the 30 September 1298 after the Battle of Falkirk and the following actions of the English army in August in Ayrshire and Dumfriesshire. He had spent September resting and resupplying in friendly Carlisle and was on his way to besiege Jedburgh Castle, which surrendered on 17 October 1298. The English commander, Lord Hertford, sent John Musgrove and George Heron along the Rule Water in November 1542, and they burnt places called Rule and Abbot's Rule.

During the Rough Wooing (1544-1551, Hertford reported that on 16 September 1545, "I sent forth a good band to the number of 1500 light horsemen in the leading of me [and] Sir Robert Bowes, which from 5 a.m. till 3 p.m., forayed along the waters of Tyvyote and Rowle, 6 or 7 miles beyond Jedburgh, and burnt 14 or 15 towns and a great quantity of all kinds of corn". A list of twelve places on the Rule Water burnt during the raid had "Rowle, Spittel, Bedrowle (Bedrule Castle), Rowlewood, The Wolles, Crossebewghe, Donnerles, Fotton (Fulton Tower), West Leas, Two walk mylnes (two fulling mills), Troonyhill, Dupligis".

In the 19th century, a toll road was constructed from Carter Bar to the market town of Hawick necessitating the building of the Bonchester Bridge over the Rule Water.

A history of the Rule Water, entitled "Rulewater and its People; An account of the Valley of the Rule and its Inhabitants" by George Tancred, was published in 1907.

== See also ==
- List of rivers of Scotland
- List of places in the Scottish Borders
- List of places in Scotland

== Gallery ==
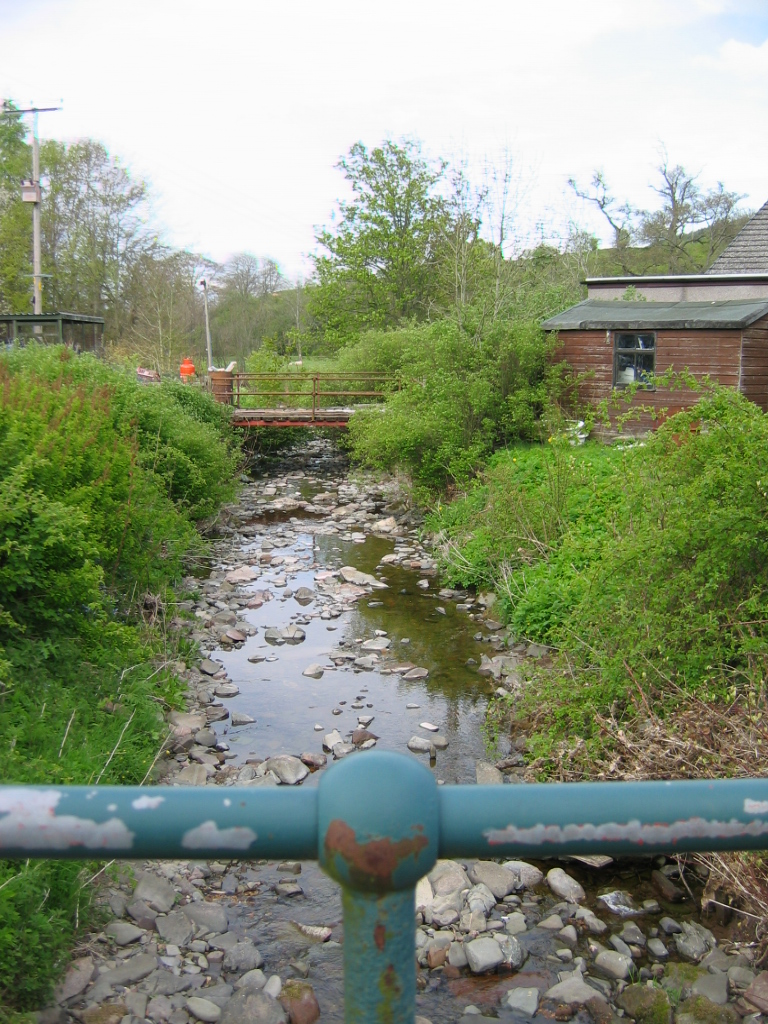
Rule Water, Bonchester Bridge

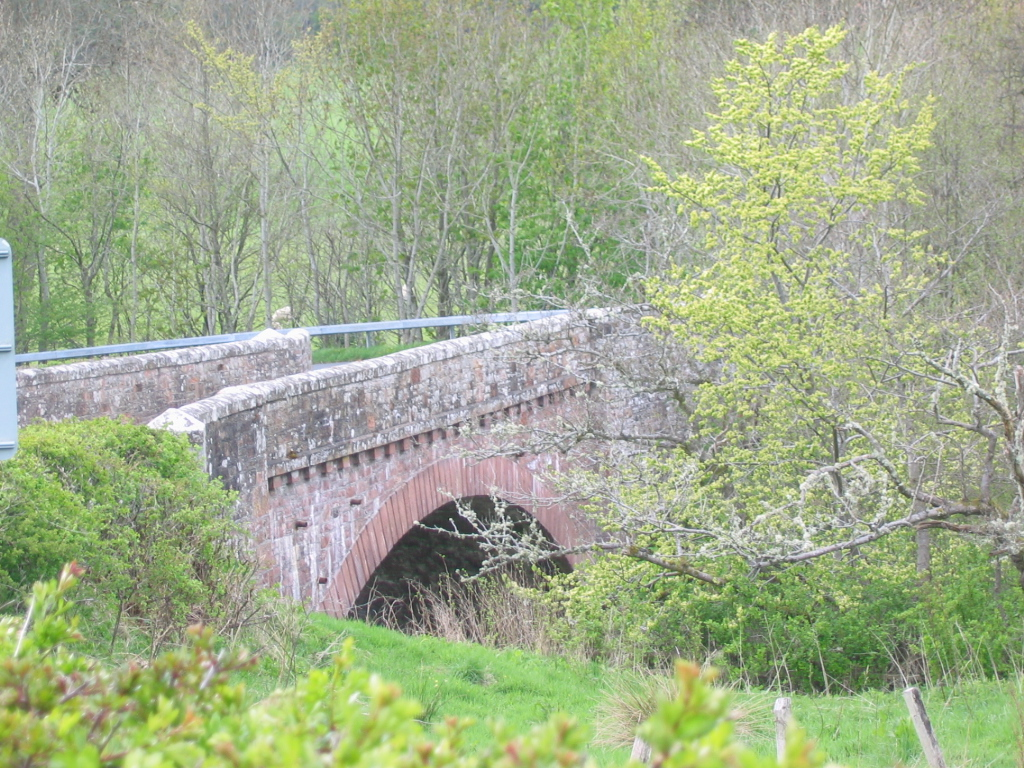
Rule Water at Hallrule

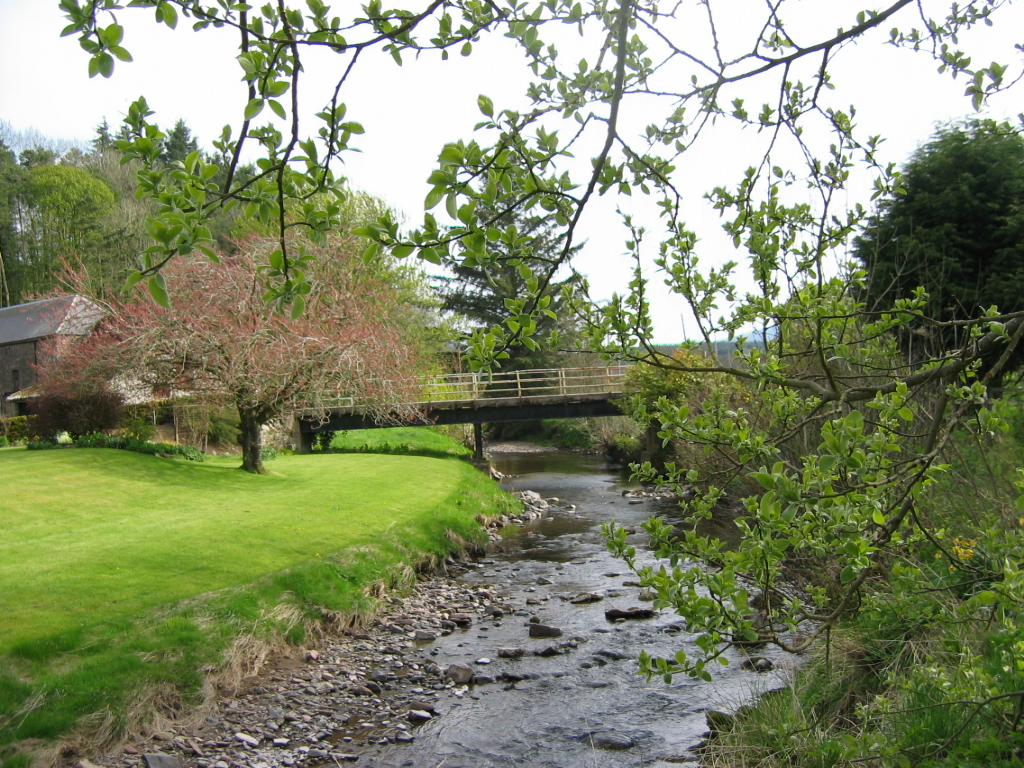
Rule Water at Hobkirk church

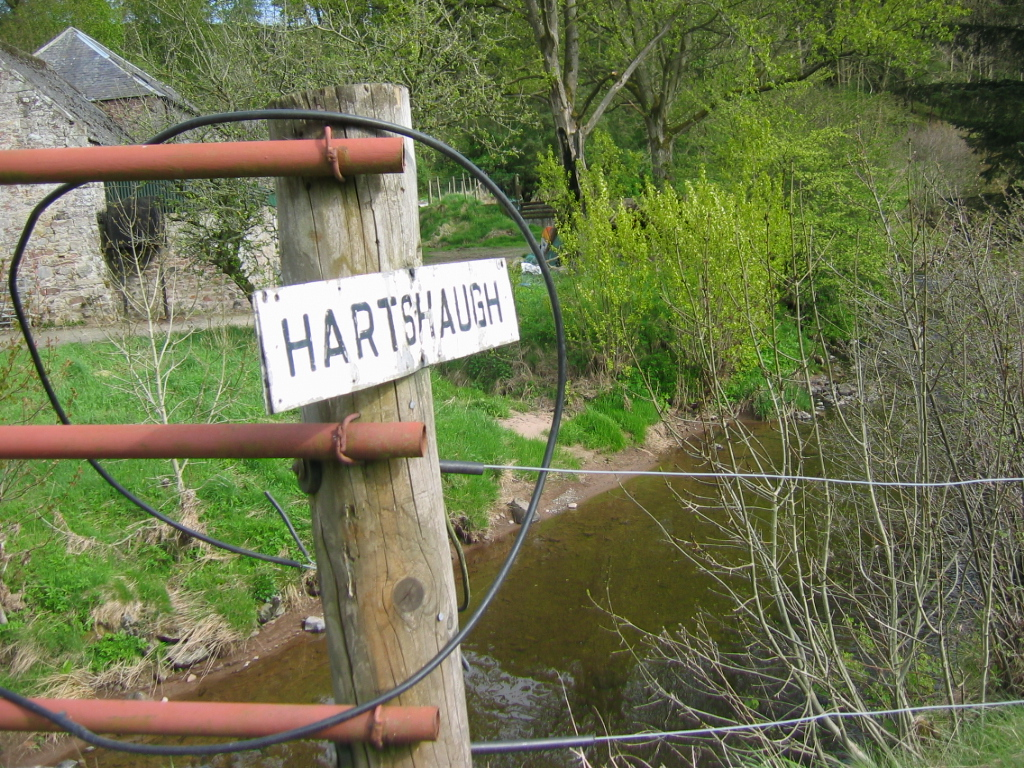
Rule Water at Hartshaugh
