= Mark Spitler =

American scientist

Mark Spitler is an American scientist, whose research includes photoelectrochemistry and semiconductor electrochemistry, spectral sensitization of solids, and sensors for detection of hazardous materials. He used to be at the United States Department of Energy, until he retired in 2018 from his position as the Program Manager for the Solar Photochemistry Program. He is an Elected Fellow of the American Association for the Advancement of Science.
