= Hobkirk =

Village and civil parish in Scotland

Coordinates: 55.38998°N 2.65414°W

Hobkirk (Scottish Gaelic: Eaglais Ruail) is a village and civil parish in the Scottish Borders area of Scotland, by the Rule Water, south-west of Jedburgh and south-east of Hawick.

Other places nearby include Abbotrule, Bonchester Bridge, Camptown, Hallrule, Bedrule, Southdean, Denholm, Rubers Law, and the Wauchope Forest.

Hobkirk was sometimes known as "Hopekirk". Part of the parish of Abbotrule was annexed to Hobkirk in 1777. The foundation stone for the present parish church was laid in 1862.

Robert Elliott (1762–1810) was born in Hobkirk and emigrated to Louiseville, Quebec. His great-great granddaughter was Grace Elliott (1890–1973), mother of 15th Canadian Prime Minister Pierre Elliott Trudeau (1919–2000) and paternal grandmother of 23rd Canadian Prime Minister Justin Trudeau (b. 1971).

== Gallery ==
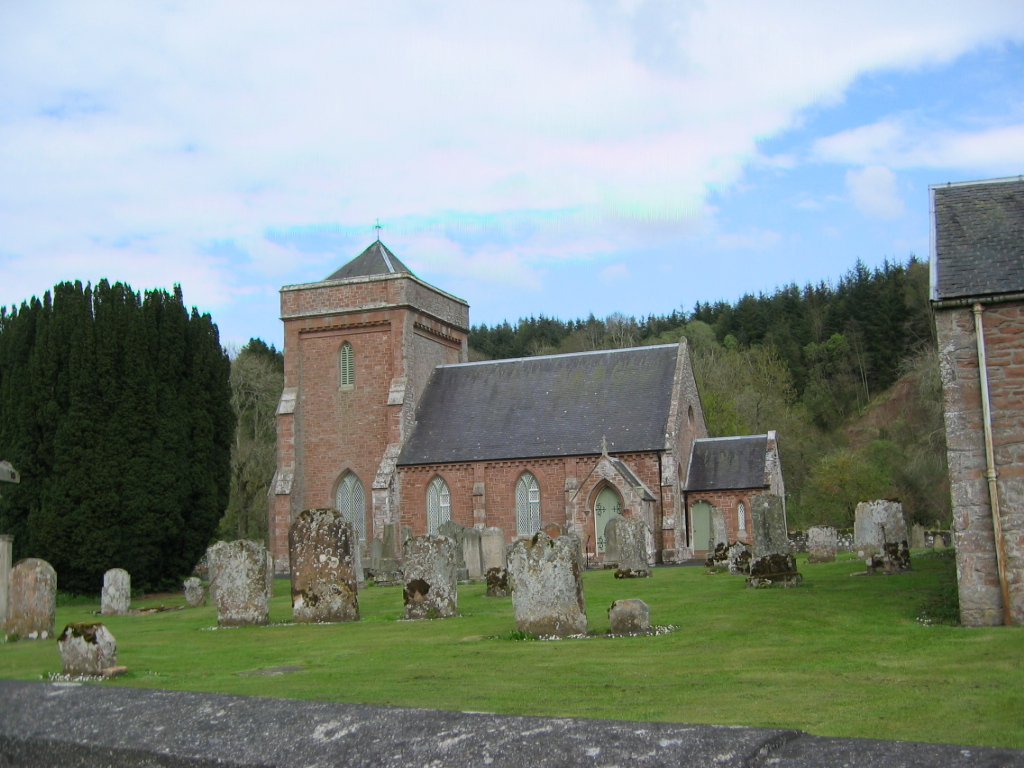
Hobkirk church

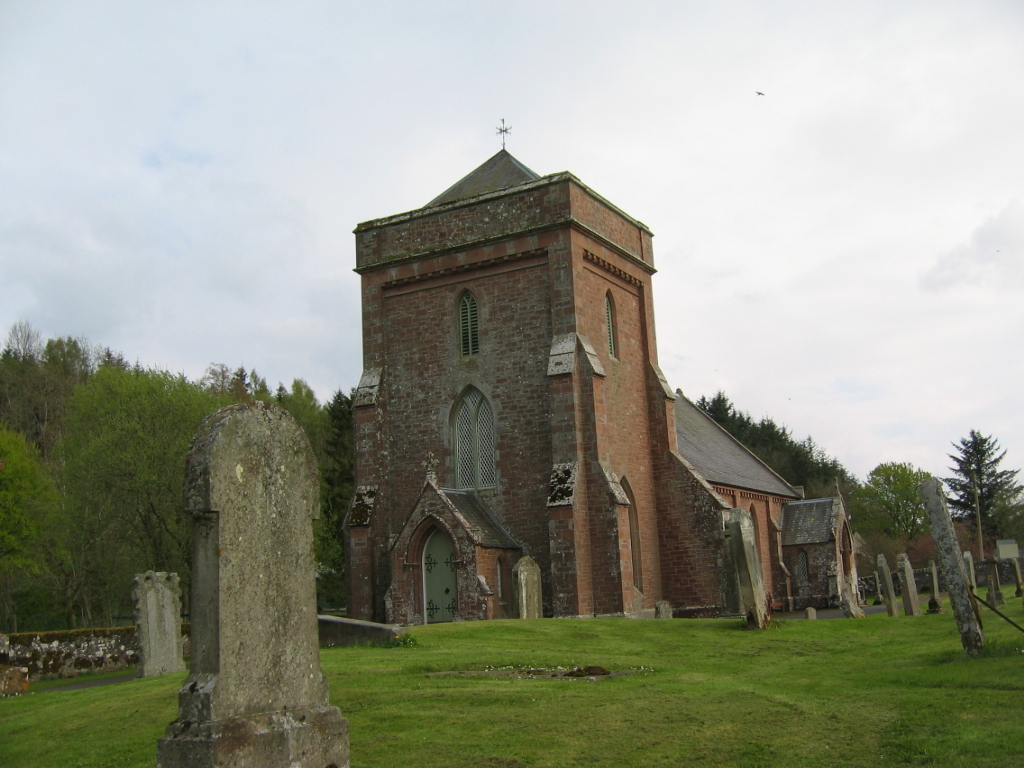
Hobkirk church

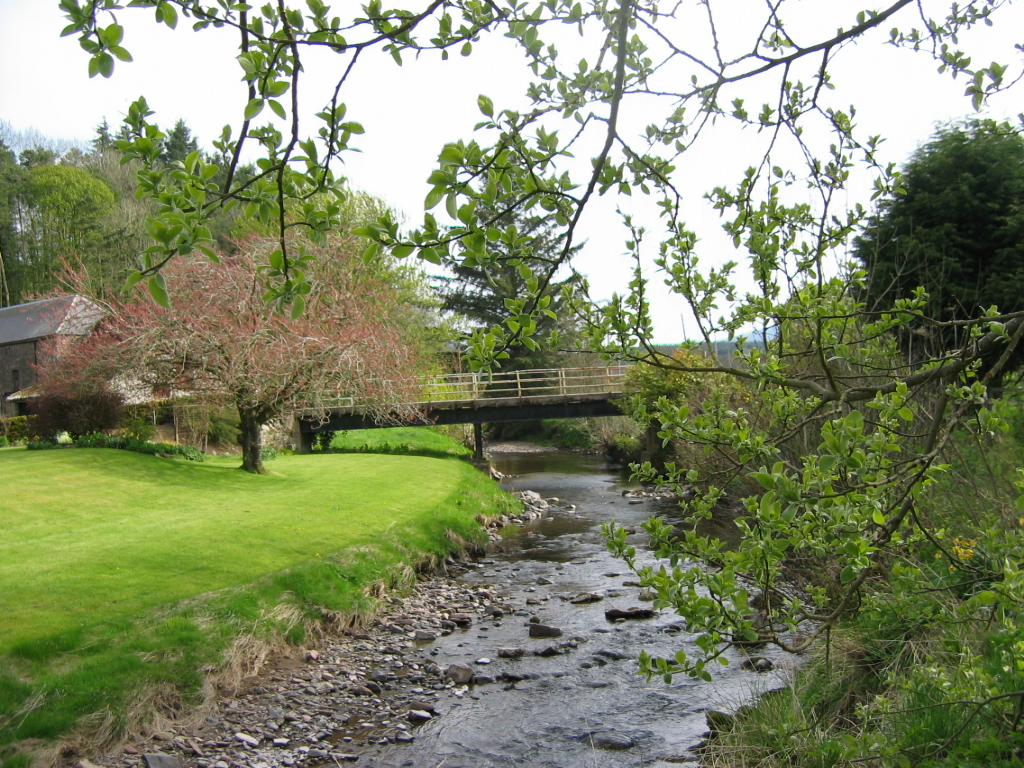
Rule Water

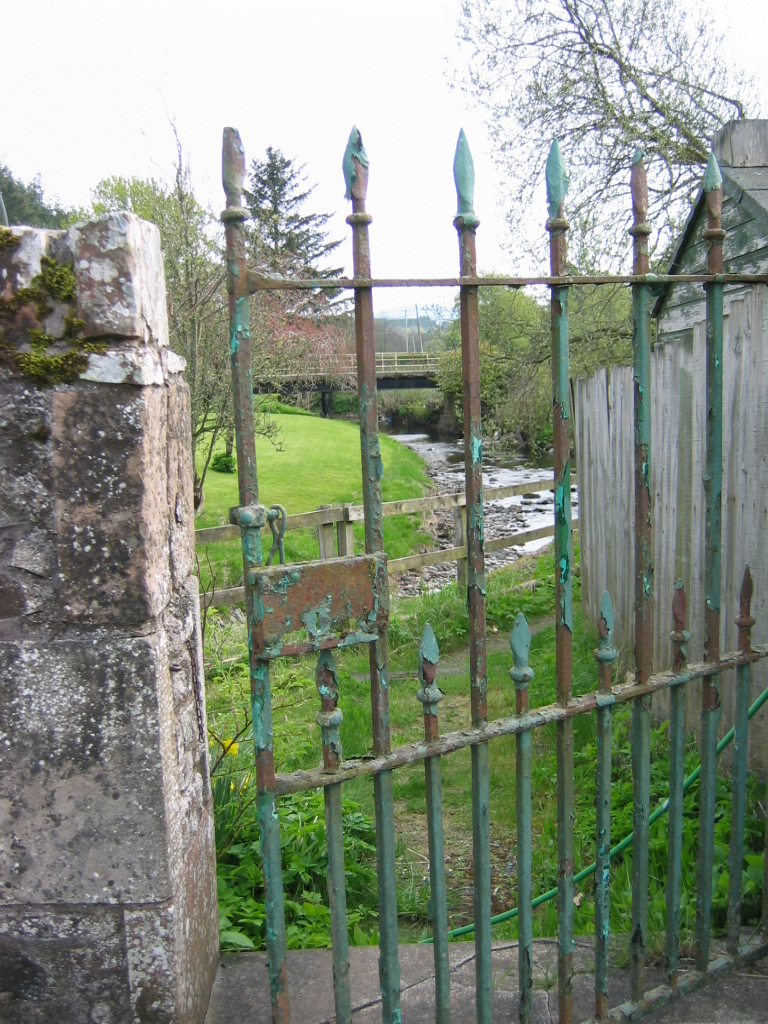
The Rule Water

== See also ==
- List of places in the Scottish Borders
- List of places in Scotland
