= Robert Bowes (lawyer) =

Sir Robert Bowes
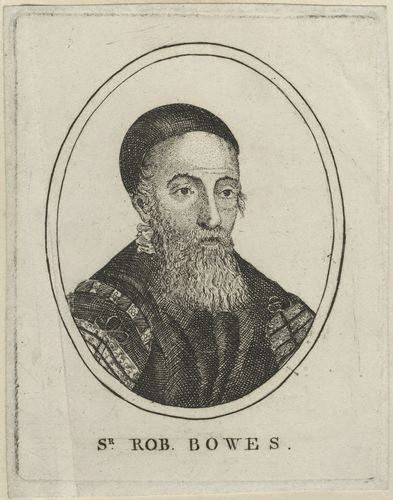
- Sir Robert Bowes
- Born: c. 1492
- Died: 28 February 1555; Berwick Castle
- Spouse: Alice Metcalfe
- Issue: several children who died young
- Father: Sir Ralph Bowes
- Mother: Margery Conyers

Sir Robert Bowes (c. 1492 – 28 February 1555) was an English lawyer and military commander.

== Family ==
Robert Bowes was the son of Sir Ralph Bowes of Streatlam in Durham, fourth son of Sir William Bowes (d. 28 July 1466) and Maud FitzHugh, daughter of William FitzHugh, 4th Baron FitzHugh (d. 22 October 1452), by Margery Willoughby, daughter of William Willoughby, 5th Baron Willoughby de Eresby. His mother was Margery Conyers (died c.1524), daughter of Sir Richard Conyers of South Cowton, Yorkshire by Alice, daughter of John Wycliffe, esquire, of Wycliffe. He had four brothers, William, Robert, Thomas and Henry, and six sisters: Margery, who married Sir William Hilton; Joan, who married Sir Ralph Bulmer; Katherine, who married Sir Richard Conyers; Margaret, who married Sir Humphrey Lisle; Isabel who married John Swynnow; and Anne, who married Ralph Wycliffe.

== Career ==
He studied law in his early years, but his ancestral connection with the Border country marked him out for employment in border affairs, where he did active service. In 1536 he was in the royal army against the Pilgrimage of Grace, and carried to the king the petition of the rebels. In 1541 he was specially summoned to London to advise the privy council about Scottish business. In 1542 he accompanied Thomas Howard, 3rd Duke of Norfolk on his plundering raid into Scotland, and was sent with 3,000 men to harry Jedburgh. He was attacked on his way at the Battle of Haddon Rig, and was made prisoner, but soon released. Lord Hertford reported that on 16 September 1545 he had "sent forth a good band to the number of 1500 light horsemen in the leading of me [and] Sir Robert Bowes, which from 5 a.m. till 3 p.m., forayed along the waters of Tyvyote and Rowle, 6 or 7 miles beyond Jedburgh, and burnt 14 or 15 towns and a great quantity of all kinds of corn". In 1550 Bowes was made warden of the east and middle marches.

In June 1551 he was one of the commissioners appointed to make a convention with Scotland. In the following September he was made a member of the privy council, and was appointed Master of the Savoy in November 1551 and Master of the Rolls in June 1552.

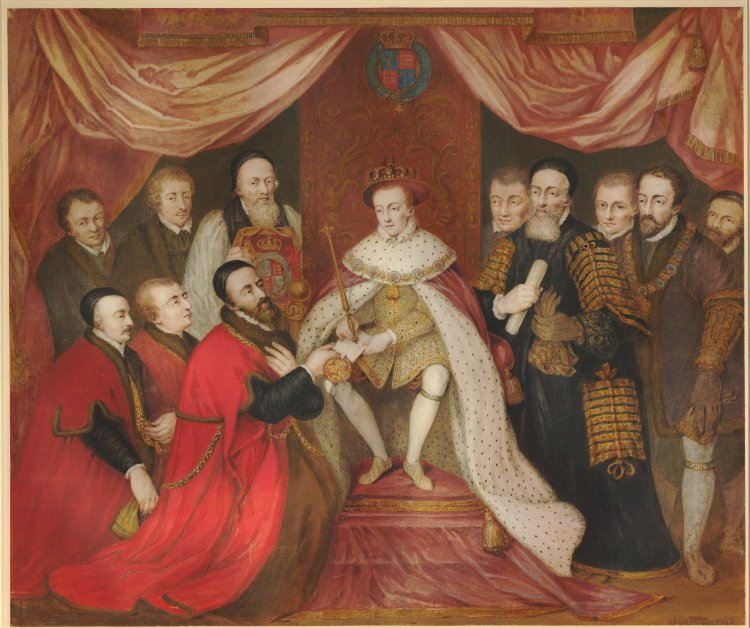
Edward VI grants a charter in 1553 to Bridewell Hospital; Bowes is the figure to the right of the king.

His signature is affixed as one of the witnesses of Edward VI's will, and he was a member of the short-lived council of the Lady Jane Grey. The council soon found its position to be impossible. On 19 July 1553 Bowes signed a letter to Richard Rich, 1st Baron Rich on Jane's behalf. On 20 July he signed an order to John Dudley, 1st Duke of Northumberland bidding him disarm. On the accession of Queen Mary Bowes was not disgraced. He held office as Master of the Rolls for two months, and then resigned of his own accord. In 1554 he was ordered by the privy council to repair to Berwick and assist John Conyers, 3rd Baron Conyers in organising the defences of the border. Soon after his return from this duty he died. He married Alice, daughter of Sir James Metcalfe of Nappa Hall, Yorkshire, but left no surviving children.

== Works ==
In his office of Warden he left a record of his administrative capacity. At the request of the warden general, Henry Grey, Marquess of Dorset, he drew up A Book of the State of the Frontiers and Marches betwixt England and Scotland. This record is the chief authority for the state of the border country in the sixteenth century. It describes the nature of the land, its military organisation, the condition of the fortresses, the number of the garrisons, and information about the character of the borderers. A lawyer as well as a soldier, he added to his survey of the country a legal treatise on the administration of the complicated system of international law by which disputes between the borderers of England and Scotland were settled. His treatise of The Forme and Order of a Day of Truce explains the formalities to be used in the execution of justice in the combined court of the wardens of England and Scotland.

Bowes's Survey of the Border is printed in John Crawford Hodgson's History of Northumberland, where, besides the survey of 1551, there is given in the note an earlier one of 1542 made by Bowes and Sir Ralph Elleker, which is more detailed. It was also printed in Reprints of Rare Tracts, vol. iv. (Newcastle, 1849), and in a private issue of the Border Club, 1838. The Form of Holding a Day of Truce is partially printed in the same issue of the Border Club, and extracts are given in James Raine's History of North Durham. A manuscript copy of both the Survey and Forme may be still found in the Bodleian Library, having been reprinted in M. A. Richardsons 'reprints of rare tracts'
