= Spittle (surname) =

Spittle is an English surname, referring to someone who worked in a spital. Notable persons with the surname include:

- Alison Spittle, Irish comedian and writer
- Billy Spittle (1893–1979), English professional footballer
- Denys Spittle (1920–2003), English archaeologist
- Margaret Spittle (born 1939), British oncologist
- Max Spittle (1920–2015), Australian rules footballer
- Rod Spittle, Canadian golfer
