= Bedrule =

Hamlet and civil parish in the Scottish Borders

Coordinates: 55.454°N 2.634°W

- Location within the Scottish Borders
- Population: 183
- OS grid reference: NT5992917931
- Council area: Scottish Borders
- Lieutenancy area: Roxburgh, Ettrick and Lauderdale
- Country: Scotland
- Sovereign state: United Kingdom
- Post town: Hawick
- Postcode district: TD9
- Dialling code: 01450
- Police: Scotland
- Fire: Scottish
- Ambulance: Scottish
- UK Parliament: Berwickshire, Roxburgh and Selkirk
- Scottish Parliament: Ettrick, Roxburgh and Berwickshire

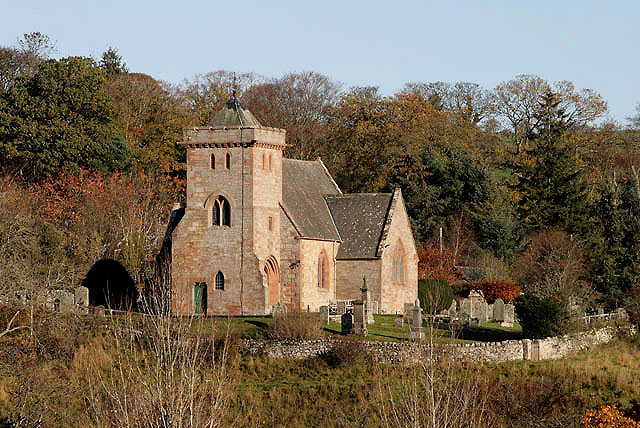
Ruberslaw Parish Church, Bedrule

Bedrule (Scottish Gaelic: Ruail Bheathaig) is a hamlet and civil parish in the historic county of Roxburghshire in the Scottish Borders area of Scotland. The hamlet lies on the east side of the Rule Water, which gave the village its name, about 4 miles west of Jedburgh. It lies south of the A698 between Hawick and Jedburgh. Other local place-names based on the river include Hallrule, Abbotrule, Ruletownhead and Spittal-on-Rule. Larger settlements include Bonchester Bridge and Denholm, as well as Hawick and Jedburgh.

The Rule Water forms the western boundary of the parish, separating it from Hobkirk and Cavers. The north-west boundary is on or near the Teviot, beyond which lies Ancrum. The parish is bounded on the east and south by Jedburgh parish.

Bedrule lies on the path of the Borders Abbeys Way, a long-distance trail.

The civil parish has a population of 185 (in 2011).

== Name and etymology ==
The name Bedrule may be of Brittonic origin. The first element may be bod, meaning "a dwelling, a habitation", with the second being the river-name Rule.

== Bedrule Kirk ==
Clan Turnbull

Bedrule Kirk, a category B listed building, is linked with Denholm and Minto churches, and it has a memorial plaque with a link to the wartime Enigma Project:

IN LOVING MEMORY OF FRANCIS ANTHONY BLAIR FASSON, LIEUTENANT, G.C. R.N. – KILLED IN ACTION IN AN ENEMY SUBMARINE IN THE MEDITERRANEAN 30TH OCTOBER 1942

First Lieutenant of HMS Petard, Anthony Fasson (a native of Lanton, Scottish Borders) died while recovering Enigma code books from a sinking German submarine.

There is another plaque in memory of Bishop William Turnbull who, in 1451, received permission from King James II to add the University of Glasgow to the city's cathedral.

The church was remodelled externally in 1803 and internally, by Thomas Greenshields Leadbetter in 1914, at which time sections were also added to create a cruciform plan. The stained glass includes work by Douglas Strachan. It lies on the southern edge of the village. The church manse lies a further 100m to the south-west.

== Bedrule castles ==
Fast Castle dates from the late 12th century and not much remains of it on the west side of Rule Water. Bedrule Castle dates from the 13th century. It was the 15th century seat of Clan Turnbull. It stood on the west side of the river Rule, where the river forms a bow, enclosing the ground on almost three sides. Only a mound now remains to mark its site, just west of the village.

The slightly more intact remnants of a fortified tower stand on land further to the west. This is known as Fulton Tower.

== Famous Residents ==
- Bishop William Turnbull
- Sir David James Hamilton Dickson RN FRSE (1780–1850) naval surgeon and botanist. Born in the manse at Bedrule the son of Rev George Dickson and spent his youth here.

== See also ==
- List of places in the Scottish Borders
- List of places in Scotland
