= Spittal-on-Rule =

Coordinates: 55.46667°N 2.65667°W

- Location within the Scottish Borders
- Council area: Scottish Borders
- Country: Scotland
- Sovereign state: United Kingdom
- Police: Scotland
- Fire: Scottish
- Ambulance: Scottish

Spittal-on-Rule is a farm in the council area of Scottish Borders in Scotland. As the name suggests it is situated on the river Rule Water, and the Spittal-on-Rule bridge crosses the Rule. More specifically, it lies where Rule Water meets the River Teviot.

== History ==
The name Spittal means 'hospital'; this was the location of a medieval leprosy hospital, as well as a chapel and graveyard. Before the existence of this hospital, the place was known as Rulemouth.

Several old maps and documents suggest that the chapel was located directly above a well.

== Notable residents ==
- William Veitch FRSE (1794–1885) classical scholar, was born and raised here.
