= Bonchester Bridge =

Village in Scottish Borders, Scotland

Coordinates: 55.3999°N 2.6552°W

Bonchester Bridge: Scots: Binster Brig
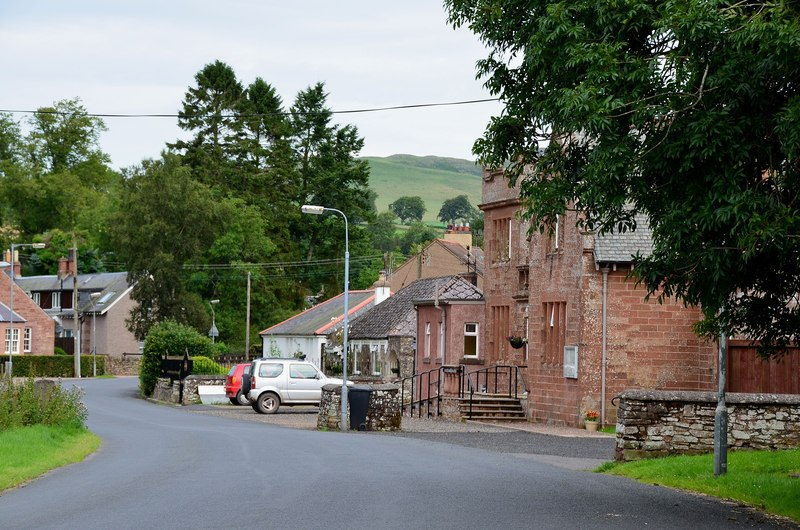
- Bonchester Bridge

- Location within the Scottish Borders
- Language: English; Scots (Southern Scots)
- OS grid reference: NT586119
- Community council: Hobkirk
- Council area: Scottish Borders
- Lieutenancy area: Roxburgh, Ettrick and Lauderdale
- Country: Scotland
- Sovereign state: United Kingdom
- Post town: HAWICK
- Postcode district: TD9
- Dialling code: 01450
- Police: Scotland
- Fire: Scottish
- Ambulance: Scottish
- UK Parliament: Berwickshire, Roxburgh and Selkirk
- Scottish Parliament: Ettrick, Roxburgh and Berwickshire

Bonchester Bridge (Scots Binster Brig) is a village in Roxburghshire, within the Scottish Borders area of Scotland, lying on the Rule Water, six miles away from the market town of Hawick.

== History ==
The name of the town is said to be Roman being devised from the term "Bona Castra" meaning "good camp" and on nearby Bonchester Hill 322 metres (1,056 ft) to the east of the village, it is topped by a hill fort.

In 1701 the town's coaching inn "The Horse and Hound" was opened, although the building there today dates from rebuilding over 100 years later by James Chisholme. The bridge in the name dates from the 19th century when a toll road was constructed from the pass over the Cheviots on the England/Scotland border at Carter Bar and the market town of Hawick which is six miles away.

At the turn on the 19th century, Scottish architect James Alison designed nearby Jedburgh Town Hall and the William Laidlaw Memorial Hall for Bonchester Bridge. It was a gift to Bonchester Bridge from his father Sir Robert Laidlaw.

During the second world war, Hallrule Hall of Bonchester Bridge became the temporary home of St George's School, Edinburgh from 1939 to 1942.

The memorial hall is managed locally, seats 120 people, and it was renovated in 2000.

== Today ==
In 2010 the Bonchester Bridge community formed Bonchester Brass, the village brass band, to serve its annual civic, religious and historical events. Bonchester Bridge was home to Hobkirk Primary School, but it closed in 2015 when its student roll fell to zero.

The Jersey cow's milk Protected designation of origin Bonchester cheese takes its name from the village.

Bonchester Bridge Campsite was first established in the 60's and closed sometime in the late 90's becoming derelict and abandoned to the elements. Bonchester Bridge Caravan and Camping Park re-opened in 2022 after almost two decades of being closed and undergoing a major refurbishment.

== See also ==
- List of places in the Scottish Borders
