= Iona Community =

Ecumenical Christian community established in 1938

The Iona Community is an ecumenical Christian community of people from different walks of life and different traditions within Christianity. It was founded in 1938 by George MacLeod.

The community and its publishing house, Wild Goose Publications, are headquartered in Glasgow, Scotland, and its activities take place on the islands of Iona and Mull, as well as in Argyll and Bute and Glasgow.

== History ==
The community began as a project led by George MacLeod, a minister of the Church of Scotland in Govan, Glasgow, to close the gap which he perceived between the church and working people. He took a group of ministers and working men to Iona to rebuild the ruined medieval Iona Abbey together. The community which grew out of this was initially under the supervision of an Iona Community Board reporting to the General Assembly of the Church of Scotland, but later the formal links with the Church of Scotland were loosened to allow the community more scope for ecumenical involvement.

The community appealed for funds to renovate the abbey leading to its re-opening, attended by Princess Anne, patron of the appeal, after a three-year closure in June 2021. The project was blessed by the "Miracle in May", when fundraising in May obtained the £300,000 needed to keep contractors working. The re-opening was featured in Songs of Praise.

== Community life and activities ==
The Iona Community is a dispersed community. It has members who work and live throughout the world. There are 270 Members, around 1,800 Associate Members and 1,600 Friends of the Community. Among them are Christians of the Presbyterian, Anglican, Continental Reformed, Lutheran, Quaker, Roman Catholic and nondenominational traditions, among others. The community has a strong commitment to ecumenism and to peace and justice issues.

The Iona Community runs three residential centres: Iona Abbey and the MacLeod Centre (now permanently closed and awaiting redevelopment) on the island of Iona, and Camas Tuath on Mull. Weeks at the centres often follow a programme related to the concerns of the Iona Community, and people are invited to come and share the life. A regular feature for guests staying in our centre on Iona is a pilgrimage around the island which includes meditations on discipleship; when the pilgrims reach the disused marble quarry or the machair, the common ground where the crofters once grazed sheep, for example, they stop for reflection on work and faithfulness.

The community has its own ecumenical liturgy which is used daily in the abbey and elsewhere.

Speaking about the visitor experience, Ruth Harvey, leader of the community, said: "This is not a hotel or a conference centre. People come for reflection and inspiration, and to explore issues of importance – the environment, poverty, migration, equality – in the context of a Christian community and in a beautiful, rugged landscape."

== Common Concern Networks ==
Members and associate members meet in focussed cluster groups around key areas of concern to the Iona Community. Through these networks, they resource and support one another to be reflective and active in the world. They also work together for systemic change through campaigning, lobbying, demonstrating, and taking action for justice. All of this action is rooted in prayer and reflection.

ECO

The Eco CCN is an international group with broad interests and experiences in faith and the environment.

POVERTY & INEQUALITY

The members of the Poverty and Inequality Common Concern Network are passionate about the Iona Community’s commitment to promote just social, political and economic structures in the UK and worldwide.

MIGRATION AND REFUGEES

The Migration and Refugees CCN is open to all who are concerned with issues to do with migration, and particularly forced migration.

CHALLENGING RACISM

The Challenging Racism CCN is passionate about projects which advocate for racial justice in churches and wider society.

ISRAEL/PALESTINE

The Iona Community advocates for peace and justice for all in Israel/Palestine through prayer, protest & engagement in members of the community

INTERFAITH RELATIONS

The interfaith relations CCN provides a space for nurturing openness, respect and confidence while exploring questions and issues concerned with faith and belief. They explore ways of engaging and listening to people and groups of different faiths and beliefs, as they together seek justice and peace in our societies.

LGBTQIA+

The LGBTQIA+ Common Concern Network exists to encourage, inform and challenge each other, the Community and the world with regard to justice and peace, wholeness and reconciliation, for those who identify as Lesbian, Gay, Bi, Trans, Questioning and all others who identify with the LGBTQ+ umbrella.

PEACEMAKING

The Iona Community has a long-standing commitment to pacifism, campaigning and action for peace and peacemaking.

== Worship ==
Amongst the most widely known song and liturgical material from the Iona Community is the experimental worship developed by the Wild Goose Resource Group, based in Glasgow. The Group exists to encourage, enable and equip the shaping and creation of new forms of worship that are relevant, contextual and participatory. The current team consists of Jo Love, Jane Bentley and Iain McLarty.

The Wild Goose Resource Group was founded in 1987 by John L. Bell and Graham Maule. With their collaborators the Wild Goose Worship Group and more recently the Wild Goose Collective, the WGRG have produced around 50 published books and CDs. In the 1980s and 1990s, the Wild Goose Worship Group was influential in introducing songs from other cultures (particularly those from South Africa) to the repertoire of churches in the UK and elsewhere.

The approaches and practices of the Wild Goose Resource Group have been widely imitated and written about. Collections of Wild Goose Resource Group songs and texts have been published internationally, including translations into Swedish, Norwegian, Finnish, Japanese, Dutch, West Frisian, Danish and German.

== Leaders and notable members ==
The leader of the community is elected by the members. The leaders to date are:

1. George MacLeod 1938–1967
2. Ian Reid 1967–1974
3. Graeme Brown 1974–1981
4. Ron Ferguson 1982–1988
5. John Harvey 1988–1995
6. Norman Shanks 1995–2002
7. Kathy Galloway 2002–2009
8. Peter MacDonald 2009–2017
9. Michael Marten 2017
10. Kathy Galloway and Caro Smyth 2017–2018
11. Kathy Galloway and Christian MacLean 2018–2020
12. Ruth Harvey, since 2020

=== Notable members ===
- Bruce Kenrick, the founder of housing organisation Shelter, was a member.
- Maxwell Craig, first general secretary of Action of Churches Together in Scotland (ACTS), was a member.
- Douglas Haldane (1926–2012), child psychiatrist was a member of the community.
- Helen Steven, was Justice and Peace Worker for the Iona Community from 1979 to 1985.
- Ellen Moxley (1935-2019), of the Trident Ploughshares anti-nuclear direct action group, was a member of the community.
- John Bell, hymn-writer and Church of Scotland minister, is a member of the Iona Community.
- Graham Maule (1958–2019), youth leader and founder member of the Wild Goose Resource Group, was a member.

- Alison Phipps, first UNESCO Chair in Refugee Integration through Languages and the Arts and at Glasgow University is a member.

== Miles Christi ==
Miles Christi was a name given to the members of the Iona Community by its founder George MacLeod. The origin of this image of being a Soldier for Christ may have its roots in Martin of Tours who as a former Roman soldier applied similar discipline to Christian life and was a great inspiration to the early Church in Scotland. St Martin's Cross, a high Celtic Cross carved in stone, stands to this day outside the entrance to the Church of Iona Abbey. The image also reflects a tradition of someone remaining on watch. The early Christian Community on Iona founded by St Columba sent members out to evangelise mainland Scotland and beyond, with some members remaining behind. George MacLeod had been a decorated soldier in the First World War. He founded the Iona Community just before the outbreak of the Second World War.

== Publishing activities ==
The community's publishing group, Wild Goose Publications, produces books on social justice, political and peace issues, holistic spirituality, healing, and innovative approaches to worship, including music (books, tapes, CDs), short drama scripts and material for personal reflection and group discussion. Many of these are the work of John L. Bell and the Wild Goose Resource Group.

== See also ==
- New Monasticism related Communities
- Servants to Asia's Urban Poor
- Madonna House Apostolate
- Catholic Worker Movement
- Bose Monastic Community
- Taizé Community
- Monastic Fraternities of Jerusalem
