= Kathy Galloway =

Church of Scotland minister (1952–2025)

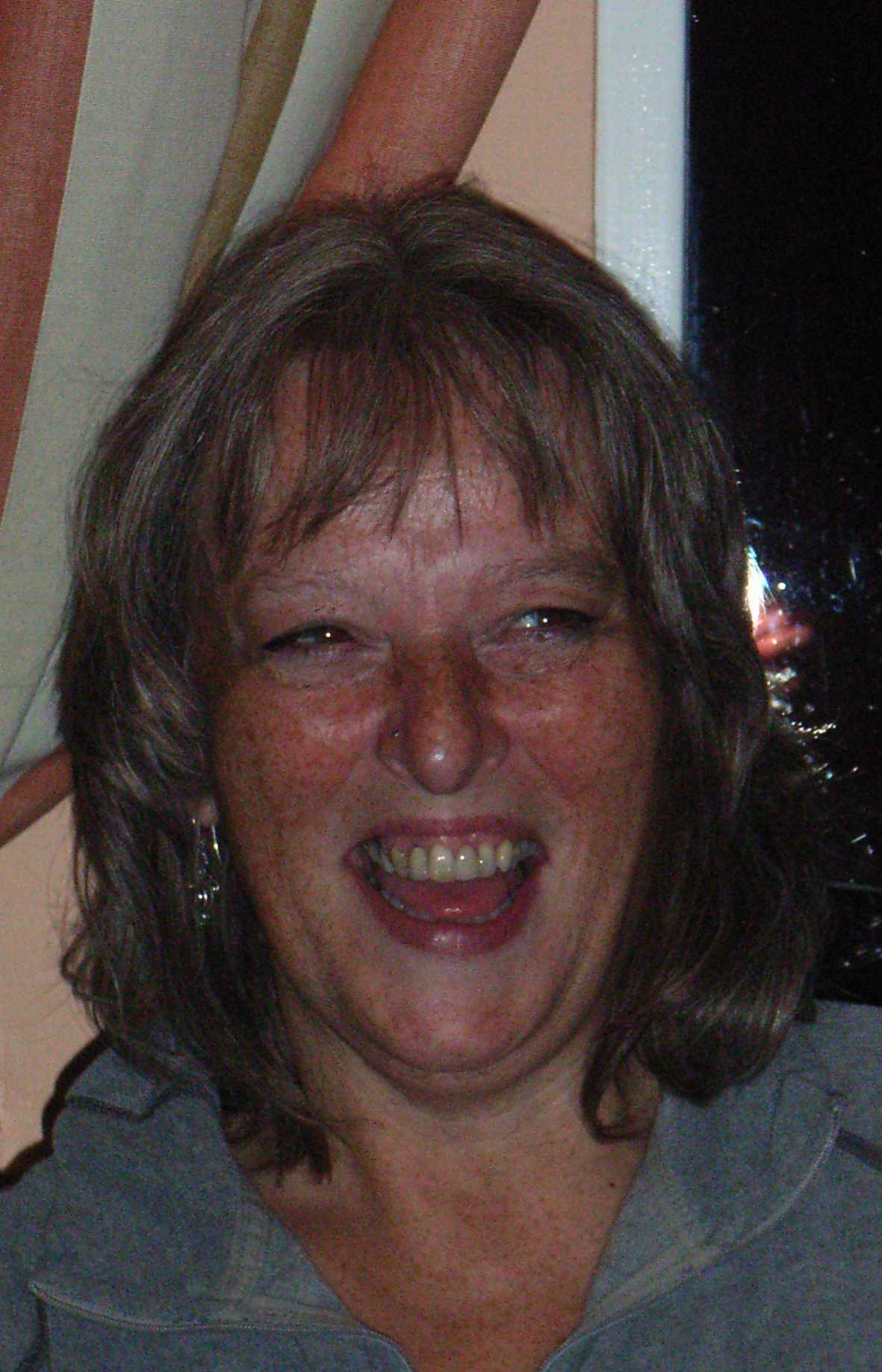
Galloway in 2006

Kathryn Johnston Galloway (née Orr; 6 August 1952 – 26 August 2025) was an ordained Church of Scotland minister and was, in 2002 the first woman to be elected leader of the Iona Community.

== Early life ==
Galloway was born in Dumfries on 6 August 1952, the eldest of four children of the Rev. Jack Orr and Janet Johnson Orr. Her father was also a member of the Iona Community, her mother was a teacher.

She was educated at Boroughmuir Secondary School, Edinburgh, and then she studied at Glasgow University for her BD for ministry.

== Ministry ==
Kathy Galloway was one of the first women ordained in the Church of Scotland. She was licensed as a minister by Edinburgh Presbytery in 1976. She was then ordained into the Church of Scotland ministry in 1977. Her ministry began as an assistant at Muirhouse Church in Edinburgh for three years (1976–1979). This was followed by being the first Coordinator of Edinburgh Peace and Justice Centre.

Through her membership of the Iona Community, which she had held since 1976, she became the co-warden for six years of the Iona Community (1983–1989). She also was the editor of its magazine, Coracle, from 1989 to 2001. Following the time as the co-warden, she spent many years working in Glasgow as a freelance practical theologian, which involved speaking and writing from a context of engagement, including organising a network on sexual abuse in the religious context.

In 2002, she was elected as the first woman Leader of the Iona Community, during which time she oversaw the building of a new Welcome Centre, renovation of the ecological outdoor centre at Camas on Mull, and staff accommodations. Her father had been one of those in the early years to argue for the inclusion of women in the community.

In 2009, she became Head of Christian Aid in Scotland, a role which she held for seven years. Her position was subsequently filled by another female Church of Scotland minister, Rev. Sally Foster-Fulton.

Throughout her ministry, she acted as a liturgical and theological resource person and consultant for numerous groupings. These included the World Council of Churches, Conference of European Churches, World Alliance of Reformed Churches, Churches Together in Britain and Ireland, and Action of Churches Together in Scotland.

Along with John Saxbee and Michael Taylor, she was a patron of the Student Christian Movement.

In 2005, she was one of 1,000 women worldwide collectively nominated for the Nobel Peace Prize.

She contributed to The Times.

== Personal life and death ==
Galloway lived in Glasgow. She had been married to fellow Church of Scotland minister, Ian Galloway, but subsequently divorced. She had three children: two sons and one daughter.

Galloway died in August 2025, at the age of 73. Her death was announced by the Iona Community. She had been suffering from cancer and sepsis.

== Publications ==
Galloway published, either as author or editor, 16 books. The subject of her writing ranged from Christian theology and devotion, to social justice for women and the poor, to collections of her own poetry. Her songs have been widely published in church hymnaries and those published by the Iona Community.

- Imagining the Gospels (SPCK 1987, 1994)
- A Woman's Claim of Right in Scotland: Women, Representation and Politics, ed. (Polygon 1991)
- A Woman's Place: Women and Work, ed. E. Templeton, introductory chapter. (St Andrew Press, 1993)
- Love Burning Deep: Poems and Lyrics (SPCK 1993)
- Struggles to Love: the Spirituality of the Beatitudes (SPCK 1994)
- Getting Personal: Sermons and Meditations (SPCK 1995)
- Pushing the Boat Out: New Poetry (Wild Goose Publications 1995)
- The Pattern of Our Days: Liturgies and Resources for Worship (Wild Goose Publications 1996)
- Talking to the Bones: Poems, Prayers and Meditations (SPCK 1996)
- Dreaming of Eden: Reflections on Christianity and Sexuality ed. (Wild Goose Publications,1997)
- 'Put Your Hand in My Side,' chapter in For God's Sake, Unity, ed. Craig, M (Wild Goose Publications, 1998)
- Starting Where We Are: Liberation Theology in Practice (Wild Goose Publications, 1998)
- A Story to Live By (SPCK 1999)
- Praying for the Dawn: a Resource book for the Ministry of Healing, ed. (Wild Goose Publications 2000)
- Walking in Darkness and Light: Sermons and Reflections (St Andrew Press, 2001)
- Sharing the Blessing (SPCK 2008)
