= Westgate Hall =

Westgate Hall may refer to:

- Westgate Hall, Canterbury, Kent, England
- Westgate Hall, Denholm, Roxburghshire, Scotland
- Westgate Hall, Grantham, Lincolnshire, England
