= John Forbes (courtier) =

John Forbes, younger of Reres (died 1570) was a Scottish courtier who served Mary, Queen of Scots.

== Career ==
John Forbes was the eldest son of Arthur Forbes of Reres and Margaret Beaton. Reres is in Fife near Kilconquhar.

Forbes married Barbara Sandilands, a daughter of the laird of St Monans. While Queen Mary was in France, Barbara Sandilands was a maid of honour in the household of Mary of Guise, the Queen's mother. After they married, their main home was Westhous in Fife near Guardbridge and they seem to have managed a royal lodge and hunting estate at Pitlethie near Leuchars. They divorced in 1563. They had three daughters including Christian, Dorothy, and Janet Forbes. Barbara had a son with William Hunter of Balcarres. Hunter's wife Grissel Traill arranged for the child to be fostered by Janat Smyth in the Cottoun of Cragfudy near Dairsie but the child died.

His mother Margaret Beaton, Lady Reres, was a nurse or governess to Queen Mary's son James VI and I. When Mary married James Hepburn, 4th Earl of Bothwell, Margaret and John stayed with them. The Confederate Lords who protested against Mary's marriage came to Edinburgh and besieged Mary at Borthwick Castle. On 11 June 1567, Mary sent John Forbes to Edinburgh Castle, to ask its keeper, James Balfour, to resist the Confederate Lords, keep the castle for her, and drive the Lords from Edinburgh by shooting cannons. Balfour did not fire his guns at the Lords.

John Forbes was killed on 15 April 1570, while fighting with the companions of John Wood. Wood was also killed, he had been the secretary of Regent Moray, who had been assassinated in January. Amongst the grievances between them leading to the fight, the propaganda campaign against Mary and her followers had included accusations levelled against John Forbes' mother, Lady Reres.
