= John Haddon =

Scottish physician and writer (1845–1924)

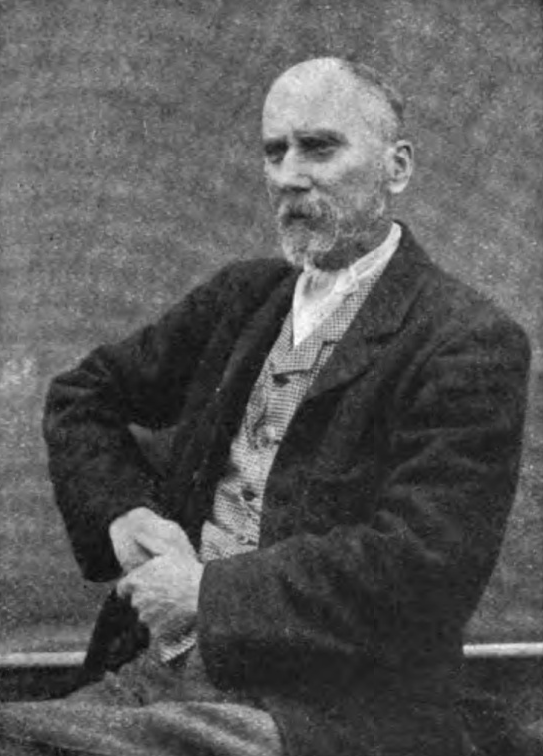
- Born: 1845
- Died: 1924 (aged 78–79); Denholm
- Occupations: Physician, writer

John Haddon (1845–1924) was a Scottish physician, dietitian and vegetarianism activist.

== Biography ==
Haddon's father was Andrew Haddon (1818–1894), his mother was Anne White (1821–1878) and he had ten siblings. He was educated at the University of Edinburgh where he obtained his M.D. degree. He was awarded the Thesis Gold Medal in 1869. He set up his medical practice in Manchester and later Hawick. Around 1880 he published a paper on Public Health for the Manchester and Salford Sanitary Association. In 1882 at the age of 37, Haddon went on a world trip across the Atlantic through America and Canada and through the Pacific. He contributed to the Hawick Archaeological Society in 1897.

Haddon resided in Denholm and authored papers on dietetics. He designed and commissioned "The Text House" in Denholm, a category B listed building. He held a number of unorthodox views. Haddon opposed marriage and described it as an "unnatural and immoral institution". Instead, he promoted individualism. He identified as a materialist but also expressed a belief in God which confused Rev David Cathels.

Haddon never married and had no children. He died age 80 at his residence in Denholm. His remains were cremated at Glasgow and the ashes were deposited at the crematorium.

== Vegetarianism ==
Haddon became a vegetarian in 1896 and practiced fasting which he claimed improved his health. He opposed drug therapy and attributed health to diet only. He believed that a minimalist diet would cure every disease and prolong life.

Haddon promoted a low-fat vegetarian diet and attributed all disease to unhealthy foods. He opposed the drinking of water and became known as an "anti-water medical man". Haddon stated that vegetarianism was a panacea for drinking habits and that he himself drank nothing at all. Haddon stated that one could go without water if a strict vegetarian diet was adhered to as plenty of fluid could be obtained in fruits and other foods. Haddon did not eat eggs or drink milk. He said that milk is only natural to the calf and disappears when it can feed itself and wild eggs only lay eggs that hatch. He ate only one meal a day and his diet was almost vegan. The only animal product that he would eat was butter.

Haddon was associated with the Vegetarian Society. In 1899, he attended the 52nd anniversary of the Vegetarian Society in Manchester. Haddon read a paper, "Experiments in dietetics" which argued that vegetarianism could cure alcoholism. In 1900, Haddon attended a branch meeting for The British Medical Journal at Newtown St Boswells. He read a paper "Elimination of Animal Products From Diet". Haddon argued from personal experience that a vegetarian diet improved digestion, ability to sleep, increased vigour, increased bodily temperature, improved the nervous system and gave a higher moral tone by giving up animal foods. The paper caused considerable discussion but few of the members present agreed with Haddon's views.

Haddon criticized overeating. In 1905, Haddon debated Dr. Litton Forbes on the subject "Do We Eat Too Much?". Their answers were published in The Grand Magazine. Haddon argued that the practice of medicine was not reaching its full potential because it was not giving dietetics a key priority. In 1919, he commented that "when we have a true science of dietetics we will be able to prescribe a diet as easily as we can now prescribe drugs, and with more beneficial and lasting results."

In 1911, Haddon authored a book entitled A Doctor's Discovery, which recommended fasting and a vegetarian diet. The book argued that food is the chief cause of disease but despite this doctors continue to cram foods into their patients to 'keep up their strength' which in many cases deprives them of recovery.

Alexander Haig who was a friend of Haddon disputed his "one meal a day" treatment for neurasthenia and other disorders. Haig commented that "this treatment entails underfeeding and leads eventually to defective nutrition of all the muscles, including that of the heart". Haddon advocated a vegetarian diet to treat gout and many other diseases. The subject of gout was debated in the British Medical Journal and Arthur P. Luff disagreed with Haddon's suggestion that a vegetarian diet was necessary to treat gout.

At age 73, Haddon commented in the British Medical Journal, "I am going to try to be a fruitarian, for I believe that man is a frugivorous animal, as our comparative anatomists have all along taught."

Haddon supported the Vegetarian Federal Union.

== Selected publications ==
- Acute Rheumatism in Private Practice (The Edinburgh Medical Journal, 1873)
- A Report on Infection (British Medical Journal, 1875)
- On Tetany (British Medical Journal, 1875)
- On Intemperance in Women (British Medical Journal, 1876)
- Clothing, and Its Relation to Health and Disease (1878)
- Health and How to Preserve It (1878)
- Note on the Excretion of Urea (The Edinburgh Medical Journal, 1879)
- Vegetarianism And Gout (British Medical Journal, 1898)
- Food versus Physic (The Edinburgh Medical Journal, 1900)
- Influenza and Pneumonia (British Medical Journal, 1900)
- Sir William Banks on Cancer (British Medical Journal, 1900)
- Therapeutic Value Of Vegetable Diet (British Medical Journal, 1902)
- Fasting in Therapeutics (The Lancet, 1904)
- Diet in Chronic Diseases (The Lancet, 1905)
- Physician, Heal Thyself (The Westminster Review, 1909)
- The Treatment Of Neurasthenia (1913)
- A Doctor's Discovery: Or the Elixir of Life. With Appendices on Fasting and Cooking (1911, 1918)

== Quotes ==
Whatever may be the conclusions of the physiologists of the future, I feel sure that it will be proved that all, even vegetarians, are at present eating not only too much food, but taking food too often, and I begin to see that eating too often is about as bad as eating too much. I am more and more convinced that few if any suffer from eating too little, while all suffer from transgressing those laws of nature which we must, as best we can, discover and obey if we would have a sound mind in a sound body.

— John Haddon, in 1904
