= Matthew Ross (minister) =

Matthew Ross is a minister of the Church of Scotland, currently serving as minister at North West Lochaber Parish Church in the West Highlands of Scotland and earlier for various ecumenical bodies, including the World Council of Churches and the Conference of European Churches. He was General Secretary of Action of Churches Together in Scotland 2014-2018.

Between 1996 and 1998 he served as a probationer for the ministry at Duddingston Kirk in Edinburgh. In 1998 he was ordained a minister by the Church of Scotland's Presbytery of St Andrews. The Rev Matthew Ross served as minister at Ceres and Springfield Parish Church, Fife, between 1998 and 2003. He was also a member of the Church of Scotland's Board of Practice and Procedure (1999-2003); he was appointed acting Depute Clerk to the General Assembly of the Church of Scotland in 2002-3.

In 2003 he moved to Brussels to work as Executive Secretary of the Church and Society Commission of the Conference of European Churches; additionally, in 2009, he served as Moderator of the Church of Scotland's Presbytery of Europe. He then returned to parish ministry in Scotland, serving at the Parishes of Cockpen and Carrington linked with Lasswade and Rosewell in Midlothian (2009-2014). He was a member of the Church of Scotland's Church and Society Council and Committee on Ecumenical Relations.

In 2014 he was appointed to succeed Stephen Smyth as General Secretary of Action of Churches Together in Scotland (ACTS). In 2018 he left ACTS to work for the World Council of Churches (based in Geneva) as Programme Executive for Diakonia and Capacity Building.

In 2023 he returned to Scotland, initially working on a research project for the University of Glasgow before becoming minister of North West Lochaber Parish Church in 2025.
