= Kilconquhar Loch =

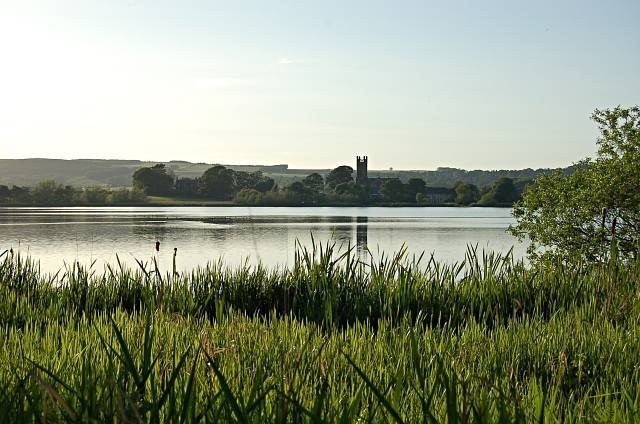

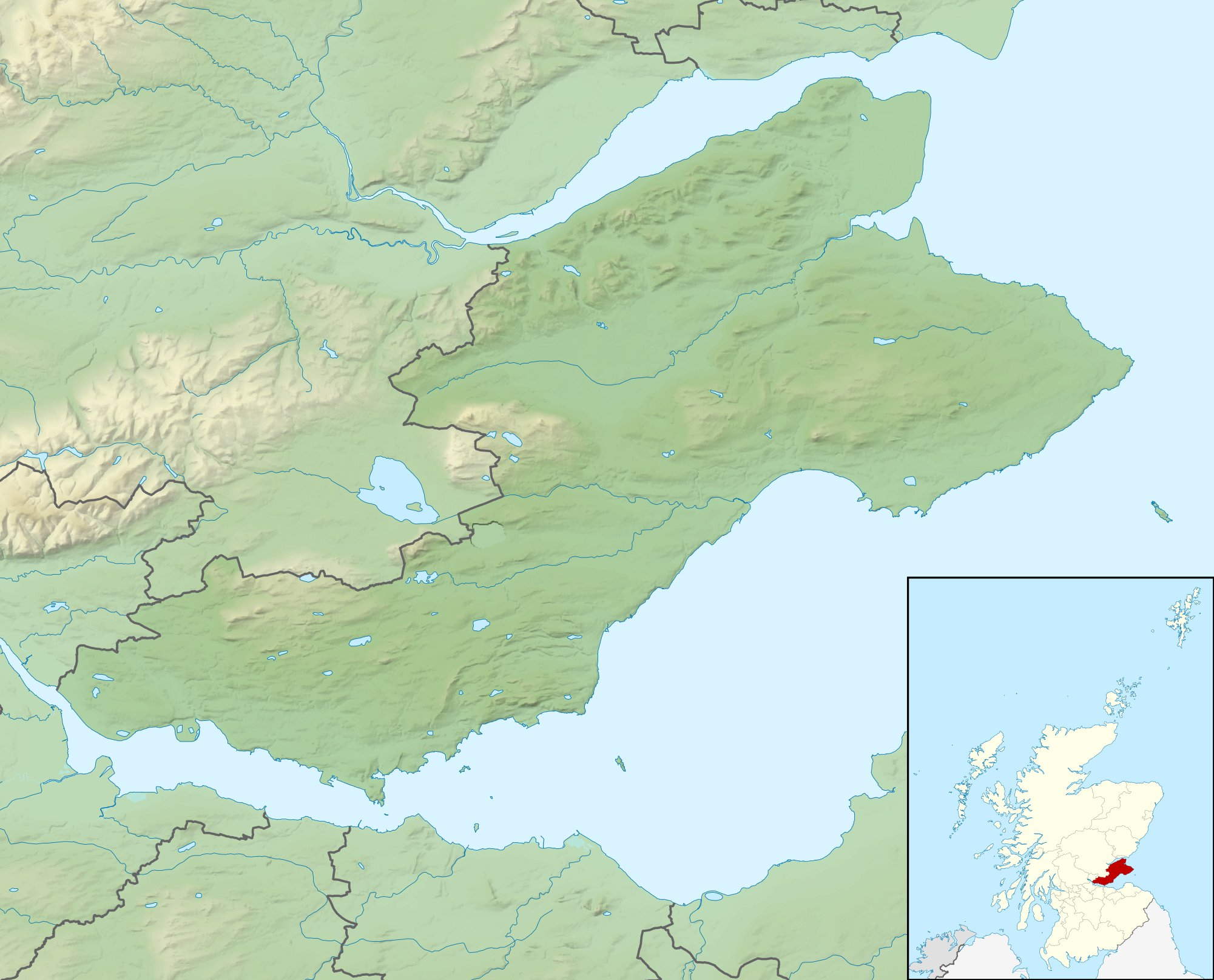
- Location within Fife
- Location: Scotland
- Coordinates: 56°12′20″N 2°49′40″W
- Type: freshwater loch
- Basin countries: United Kingdom

Kilconquhar Loch /kɪˈnjʌxər lɒx/ is a Scottish freshwater loch.

This small shallow loch is a Site of Special Scientific Interest (SSSI) and is located beside the village of the same name in the east of Fife, within a mile to the north of the coastal village of Elie.

The loch appears to be a comparatively recent feature, the earliest reference being to "the gret loch callit of auld the Reidmyre" (Scots: red or reed peat bog) in 1599 and referred to as Keanwchar Loch by 1654 in Blaeu's Atlas Novus. Samples of the loch bed support its origin as a bog and there is archaeological evidence and a local tradition that fuel was extracted. Westward outflow to the Cocklemill Burn is said to have been blocked by sand in 1624 or 1625 but it is drained to the south-east by the largely underground Loch Run into Elie harbour and eastwards to the Inverie Burn.

It is an approximate rounded square in shape, and is unusual in that it has no visible inflow, yet is not stagnant. It is the subject of a study by St. Andrews University. It has been theorised that an underground spring feeds into the loch, maintaining a degree of freshness sufficient to offset its stagnation.

In former times it was reported to produce large pike and eels, although this is now no longer verifiable as no fishing is allowed, due to its SSSI status.

Large numbers of overwintering wildfowl use Kilconquhar Loch as a roost.

It was charted during the Bathymetrical Survey of the Fresh-Water Lochs of Scotland, constructed under the direction of Sir John Murray and Laurence Pullar during the years 1897 to 1909.
