= Ernest David Jarvis =

Scottish minister

Ernest David Jarvis (1888-1964) was a Scottish minister of Wellington Church in Glasgow from 1929 to 1958 who served as Moderator of the General Assembly of the Church of Scotland in 1954.

== Life ==
He studied divinity at St Andrews University. He later received honorary doctorates (DD) from both St Andrews and Glasgow University.

He died at Elie in Fife on 21 January 1964 aged 75.
