= James Roxburgh McClymont =

Scottish naturalist and author

- Born: James Roxburgh McClymont; 23 August 1854; Denholm, Scotland
- Died: 21 May 1936 (aged 81); France
- Occupations: author, biographer
- Known for: authoring several books

Academic background
- Education: University of Edinburgh

Academic work
- Institutions: Australia
- Website: commons.wikimedia.org/wiki/Category:James_Roxburgh_McClymont

James Roxburgh McClymont (23 August 1854 – 21 May 1936) was a Scottish-born Australian poet, historian, geographer, cartographer and naturalist. He is most well known for his biography of Pedro Álvares Cabral, the legendary Portuguese navigator.

== Biography ==
He was born on23 August 1854 in Denholm, Scotland.

He died on 21 May 1936 in France.

== Education ==
He completed his Master of Arts degree at the University of Edinburgh in 1876.

== Career ==
Although he was of Scottish origin, he lived and worked in Australia from 23 Jan 1881 to 1913.

== Bibliography ==
He is the author of a number of notable books:

- Pedro Álvares Cabral: His Progenitors, His Life, and His Voyage to America and India (London: B. Quaritch, 1914)
- Essays on early ornithology and kindred subjects - Essays on Early Ornithology and Kindred Subjects - Wikisource, the free online library
- Characters in outline and other poems
- Essays in historical geography and on kindred subjects
- The land of false delight and other poems

== See also ==
- Pedro Álvares Cabral
- University of Queensland
