= Denholm =

Coordinates: 55.457978°N 2.68467°W

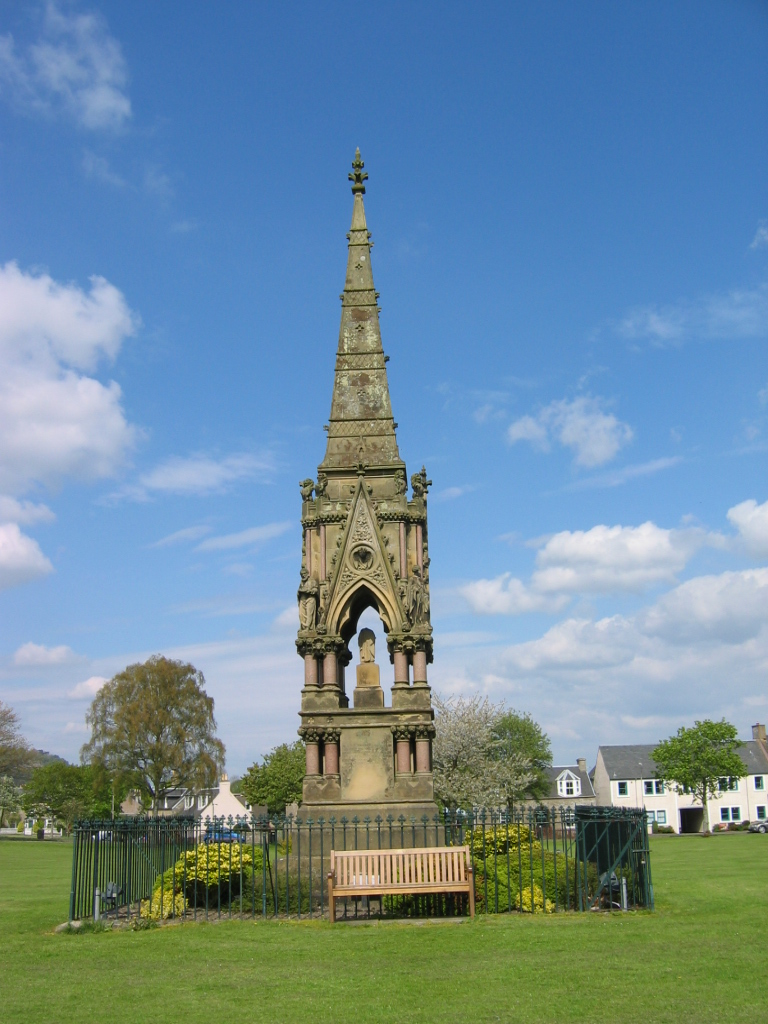
- Leyden's monument on the Green, Denholm

- Location within the Scottish Borders
- Population: 710 (2020)
- OS grid reference: NT568184
- Council area: Scottish Borders
- Lieutenancy area: Roxburgh, Ettrick and Lauderdale
- Country: Scotland
- Sovereign state: United Kingdom
- Post town: HAWICK
- Postcode district: TD9
- Dialling code: 01450
- Police: Scotland
- Fire: Scottish
- Ambulance: Scottish
- UK Parliament: Berwickshire, Roxburgh and Selkirk
- Scottish Parliament: Ettrick, Roxburgh and Berwickshire

Denholm (/ˈdɛnəm/ DEN-əm) is a small village located between Jedburgh and Hawick in the Scottish Borders. There is a village green in the centre. It lies in the valley of the River Teviot. Denholm is a Conservation Area listed as "a planned village as opposed to the traditional unplanned or organic form of village usually found in Roxburghshire".

The village of Denholm is situated in Teviotdale, about halfway between Hawick and Jedburgh. It lies in gentle rolling countryside between Rubers Law and the Minto Hills, volcanic outcrops which thrust up through the underlying Old Red Sandstone.

The original settlement of "Denum" was sited "at the valleys", where the broad valley of the River Teviot meets the narrow glen of the Dean Burn. The early hamlet was plundered and burnt during English raids of the 16th century. The village we see today dates from the 17th century when it was laid out around the Green.

The population of the village was 653 in 2011.

== History ==
The village is built around the Green, which in days gone by was let for grazing to the butchers or smallholders. In the middle of the Green stands Leyden's Monument, which was erected in 1861 in honour of Dr John Leyden (1775–1811), poet, antiquarian and orientalist, who was born in Denholm. The monument was designed by the architect Hector H. Orrock, and sculpted by Alexander Handyside Ritchie. The Green has always been at the heart of village life. Weekly and half-weekly fairs used to be held here. Part of the base of an old mercat cross can still be seen inside the railings surrounding the monument. The cross itself was removed and the base hollowed out sometime in the 19th century to make a water trough for cattle. Westgate Hall built in 1663 stands at the western approaches to the village.

In Main Street, stands The Text House, a category B listed building, erected about 1910 by John Haddon (1845–1924), a medical doctor and author of published works on public sanitation and dietetics. The 3-storey house is in the arts and craft style. One of the texts on the front elevation is a reminder to take care with time before it passes, "TAK TENT IN TIME ~ ERE TIME BE TINT", the other text reminds the occupier that there were and will be others living in the house, "ALL WAS OTHERS ~ ALL WILL BE OTHERS".

Council pre-fabs were put up in the Ashloaning at the end of the war followed by the "Crudens semis" and the "Orlits". During the 1950s, six more semi-detached houses were built in The Loaning and ten in Murray Place. All through the 1950s the public water supply was inadequate for the post-war village, but in 1963 a proper supply was finally piped in from Alemoor Loch above Roberton. The way was now open for more housing development. Like most villages, Denholm is expanding, and many new houses have been built in the past few years. Denholm Mill and Denholm Hall Farm have both been developed for housing, but the centre of the village around the Green is a conservation area.

Denholm was the only village in the civil parish of Cavers and is situated in the north-east corner of the parish.

== Notable people ==
- James Duncan (zoologist)
- Ainslie Henderson (b. 1979) Singer/songwriter
- John Leyden Orientalist
- Prof. Dr. William Lowrie Professor of Geophysics at the ETH Zurich (1974/2004). Fellow of the American Geophysical Union and member of the Academia Europaea.
- James Murray (1837–1915), Philologist, primary editor of the Oxford English Dictionary from 1879 until his death
- Charles Oliver Murray (1842–1923), artist and printmaker, brother of Sir James Murray
- James Roxburgh McClymont (1854-1936), Scottish historian, author and naturalis
- John Scott (botanist) (1836–1880)
- William Johnstone (artist) (1897–1981)

== See also ==
- List of places in the Scottish Borders
- List of places in Scotland

== Gallery ==
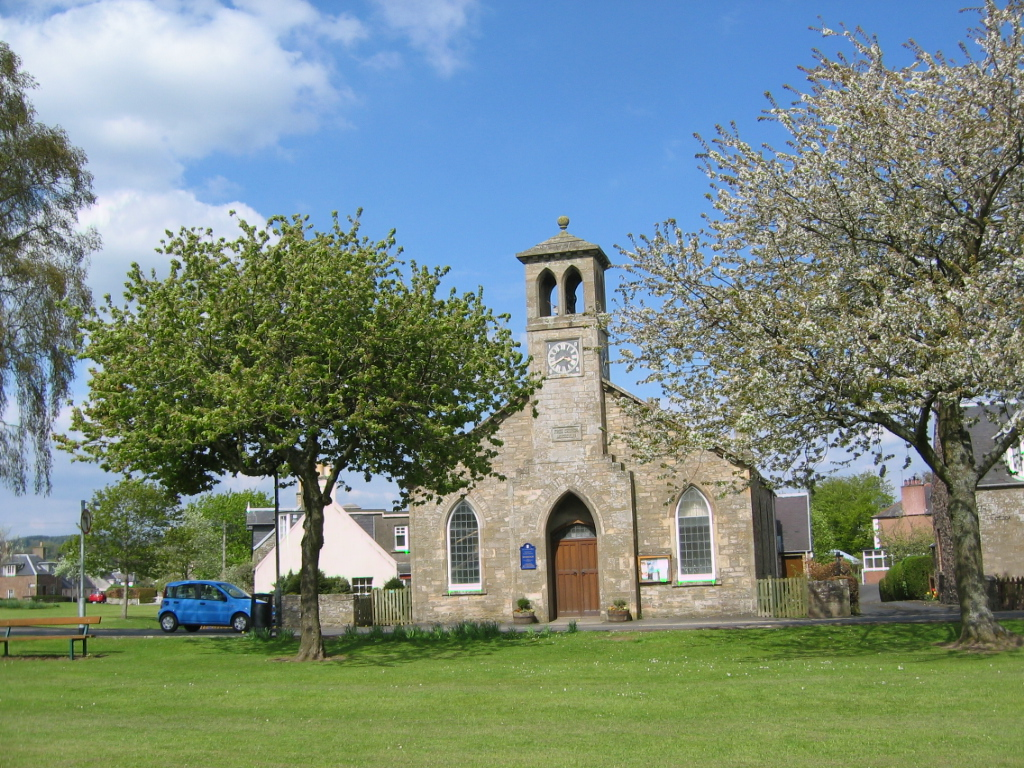
The Kirk by the Green

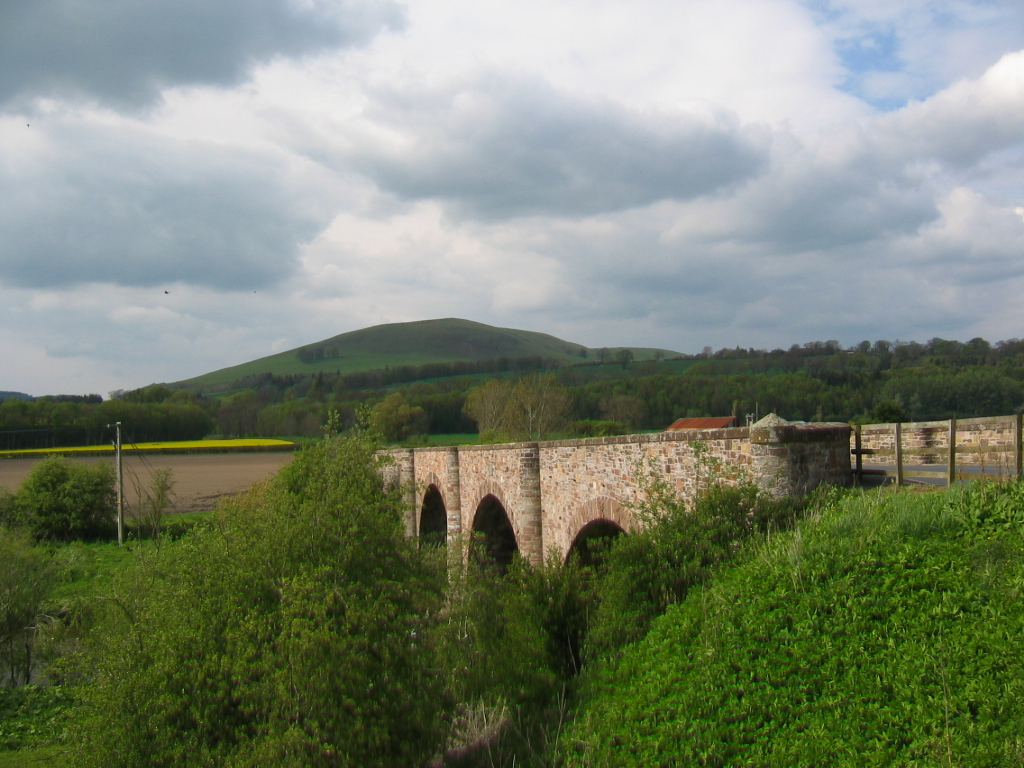
Bridge over the River Teviot

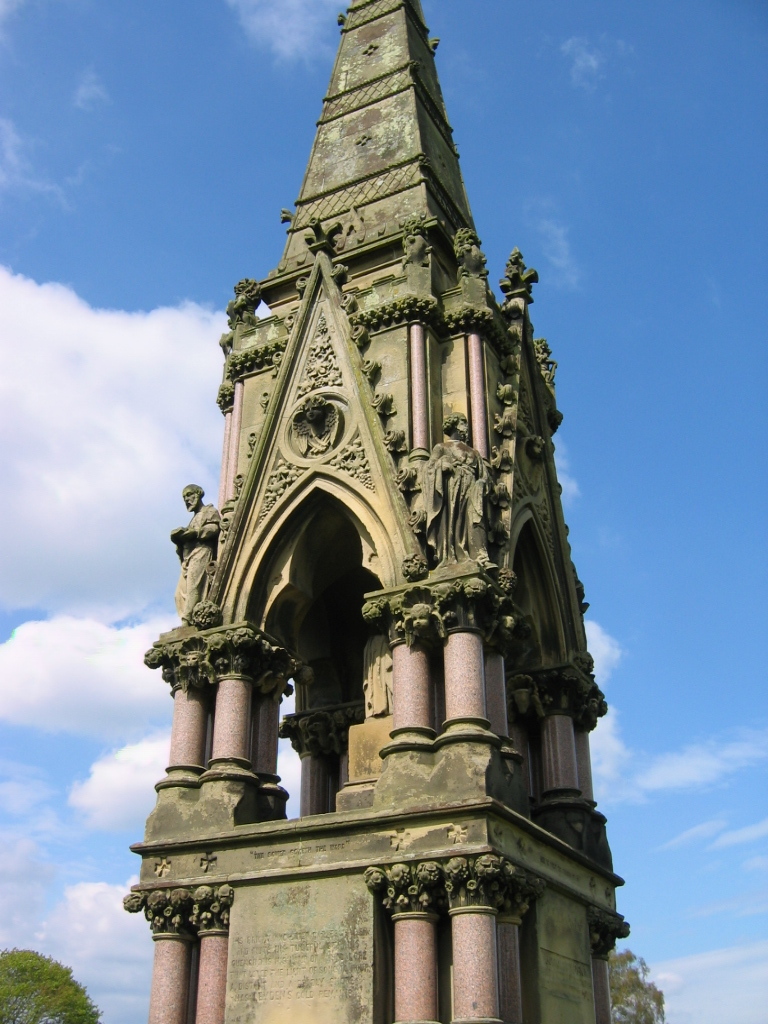
The memorial to Dr. John Leyden, distinguished orientalist, and a son of Denholm

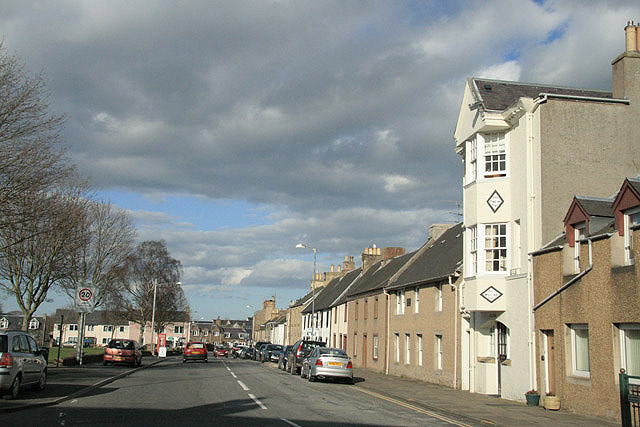
The Text House, with text in four diamond-shaped panels
