= Lasswade and Rosewell Parish Church =

Church in Midlothian, Scotland

Coordinates: 55.88247°N 3.11349°W

Lasswade and Rosewell Parish Church serves the communities of Lasswade, Poltonhall and Rosewell, Midlothian, Scotland. It is a congregation of the Church of Scotland.

== Old Lasswade Parish Church ==
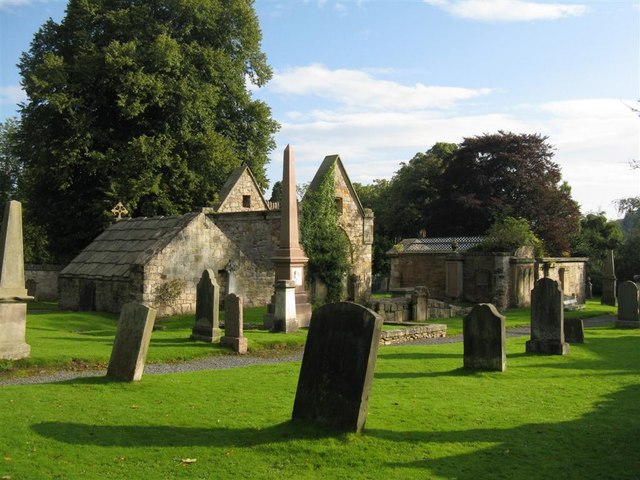
Old Lasswade Parish Church and churchyard

The pre-Reformation church was abandoned in 1793 and the bulk of the structure collapsed in 1866.

Notable ministers included Rev Prof James Fairlie who served from 1644 to 1658.

== Lasswade ==
The congregation uses the former Lasswade United Presbyterian Church of Scotland (later United Free Church of Scotland) building, which became known as Lasswade Strathesk Church in 1929, following the union of the Church of Scotland and the United Free Church. In 1956 the Old Parish Church (subsequently demolished) and Strathesk Church united, following the discovery of a serious structural fault with the Old Parish Church building in the late 1940s.

== Rosewell ==
The church was built in the 1870s, initially as a daughter church of Lasswade Parish Church.

In 1966 the Rev James H. Sinclair was ordained and inducted to Rosewell Parish Church - the last minister to serve Rosewell alone. Following his move to Selkirk in 1987, the parish was declared a "continuing vacancy" until 1991, when the church was "linked" with both Cockpen & Carrington Parish Church and Lasswade Parish Church.

== Linkage and Union ==
Since 1977, Lasswade has been "linked" with Cockpen and Carrington Parish Church (i.e. share a minister). In 1991 both parishes were further linked with Rosewell Parish Church.

In 2008, due to low congregation levels at both parishes, Lasswade and Rosewell parish churches formally united, with a single Kirk Session, but retained both places of worship. The congregation is now officially known as "Lasswade and Rosewell Parish Church".

== Ministry ==
=== Recent ministers ===
Lasswade: To be added

Rosewell:

- The Rev James Sinclair (1966-1987)

Lasswade and Rosewell:

- The Rev Wendy Drake (1992-2007)
- The Rev Matthew Ross (2009-2014)
- The Rev Lorna M Souter

== See also ==
- List of Church of Scotland parishes
