= Leuchars Castle =

- Scotland
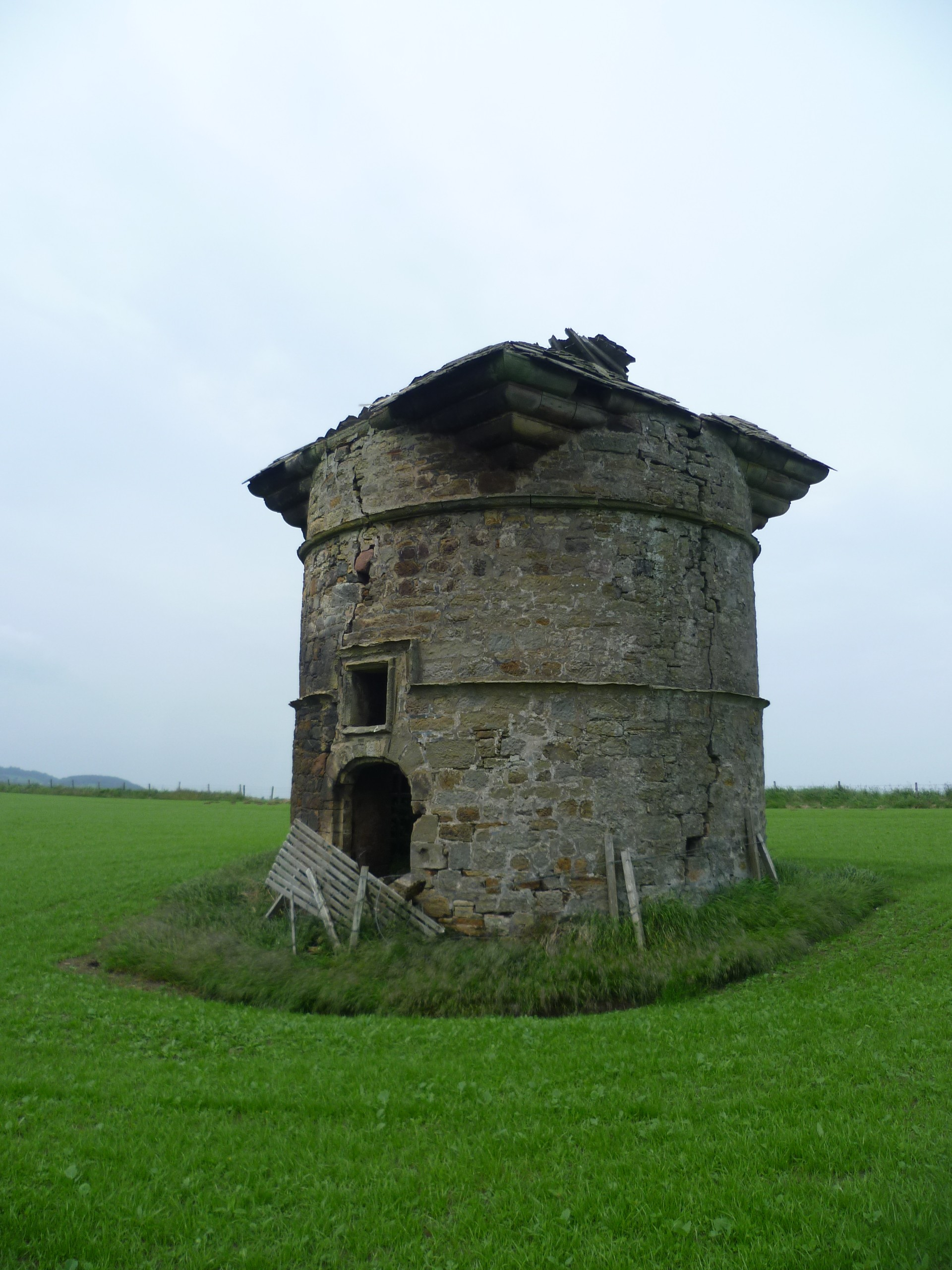
- The surviving castle doocot

Location
- Location within Fife
- Coordinates: 56.3865°N 2.8851°W

Leuchars Castle, was a castle that was located near Leuchars, Fife, Scotland.

A motte and bailey castle was built in the 12th century. The town was created a barony in the time of King William the Lion. The castle was built of stone in the 13th century. The English attacked and slighted the castle in 1327. The castle was besieged and attacked in 1337 by forces of Sir Andrew Murray and the English garrison surrendered. Rebuilt in the 16th century, the castle was demolished in the 20th century.

The nearby castle doocot is category A listed, and is on the Buildings at Risk Register for Scotland.

== Royal house at Pitlethie ==
Archival records such as the royal household books and pursemaster's accounts mention that James V and Mary, Queen of Scots, frequently stayed at Pitlethie, to the north of Leuchars. The attractions included falconry and hunting in the Tentsmuir Forest. The royal building has long been demolished. An armorial stone of the royal arms was discovered in the 18th-century. The stone was also said to relate to Archbishop Alexander Stewart, a son of James IV.

James V waited for Mary of Guise to arrive in Scotland at Pitlethie. He issued sixteen great seal charters at Pitlethie between on dates between August 1537 and May 1542. The surviving household books mention visits in May, July, and August 1539. Regent Arran visited Pitlethie on 24 July 1547 while travelling from Edinburgh to St Andrews.

In June 1565, Mary, Queen of Scots, granted lands at Easter and Wester Pitlethie to Margaret Erskine. The estate at Pitlethie may have been managed by Arthur Forbes of Reres and his wife Margaret Beaton, and their son John Forbes. The house at Pitlethie was also used by Mary's half-brother, the son of Margaret Erskine, James Stewart, 1st Earl of Moray.
