= Stephen Smyth (Marist Brother) =

REQUEST DELETION: I am the Stephen Smyth mentioned in this article and wish it to be deleted. Reason: I am no longer a member of the Marist Brothers and the post of General Secretary of ACTS (Action of Churches Together in Scotland) no longer exist. I retired from this post in 2014. The information is effectively redundant. Thanks.

Stephen Smyth FMS is a Marist Brother from Scotland. Between 2007 and 2014 he served as General Secretary of Action of Churches Together in Scotland; the first Roman Catholic to hold this post. He retired in 2014 and was succeeded by the Rev Matthew Ross.

== Background ==
He was born in Glasgow in 1950. He has a Master of Ministry and Theology degree from the University of Sheffield, where he studied at the Urban Theology Unit. Before working with Action of Churches Together in Scotland, he was for the previous seven years Ecumenical Officer of Glasgow Churches Together and has a background working in education.
