= Wellington Church =

- Wellington Parish Church
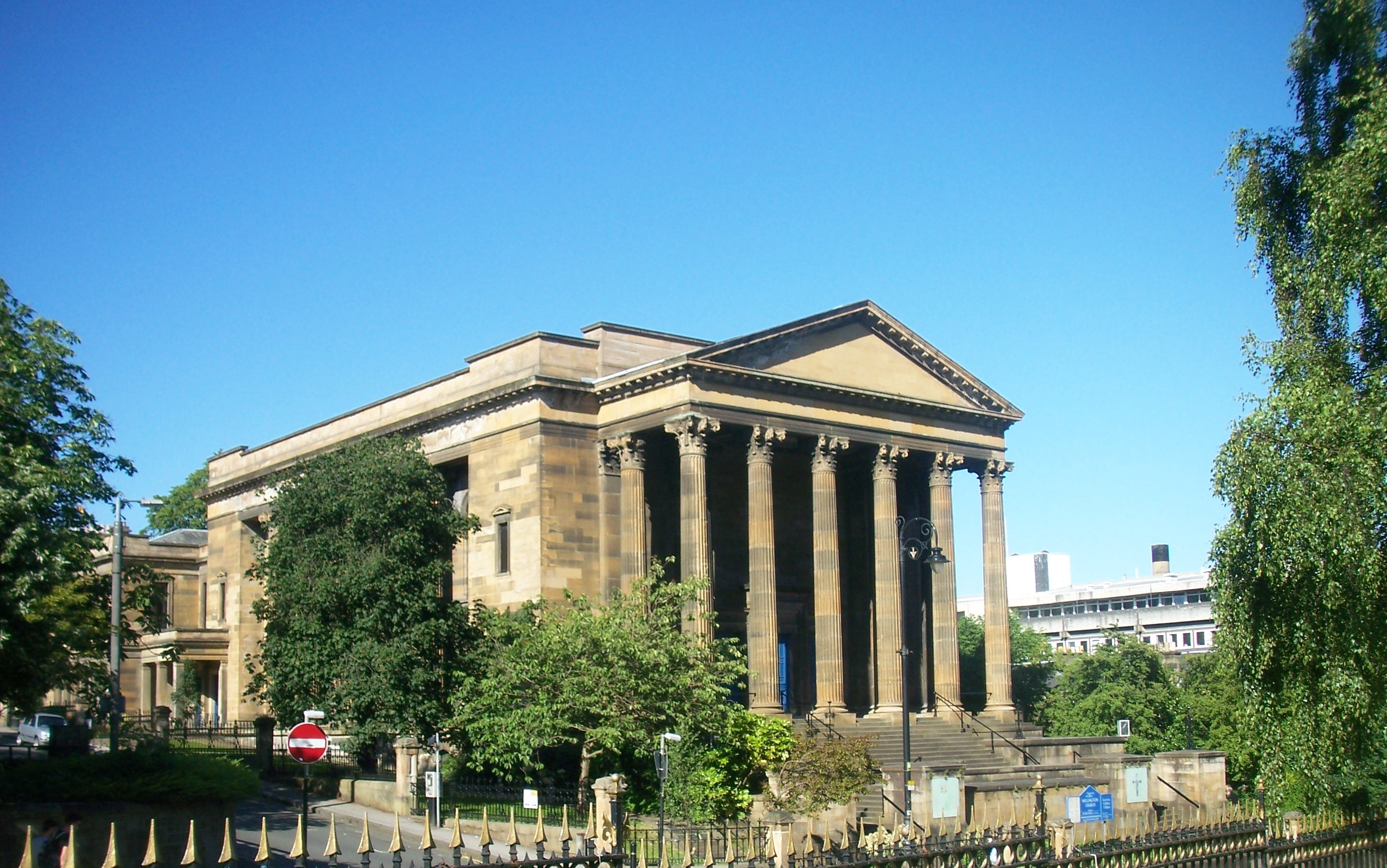
- Wellington Church
- 55.872528°N 4.287051°W
- Location: 76 University Avenue, Glasgow
- Country: Scotland
- Denomination: Church of Scotland
- Website: wellingtonchurch.co.uk

History
- Status: Church
- Founded: 1884 (142 years ago)
- Founder: United Presbyterian Church of Scotland

Architecture
- Functional status: Active
- Heritage designation: Category A
- Designated: 6 July 1966 (59 years ago)
- Architect: Thomas Lennox Watson
- Style: Neoclassical
- Groundbreaking: 1883 (143 years ago)
- Completed: 1884 (142 years ago)

Wellington Church is home to and owned by the congregation of Glasgow: Kelvin West Parish Church of Scotland, a congregation resulting from a union between the congregations of the former Wellington Church of Scotland and Kelvinbridge Parish Church of Scotland. The new congregation serves large parts of the Westend area of Glasgow, Scotland. The parish includes parts of Hillhead, Woodlands, Kelvinbridge and Maryhill. The building is located on University Avenue, Glasgow, opposite the University of Glasgow.

== Building ==
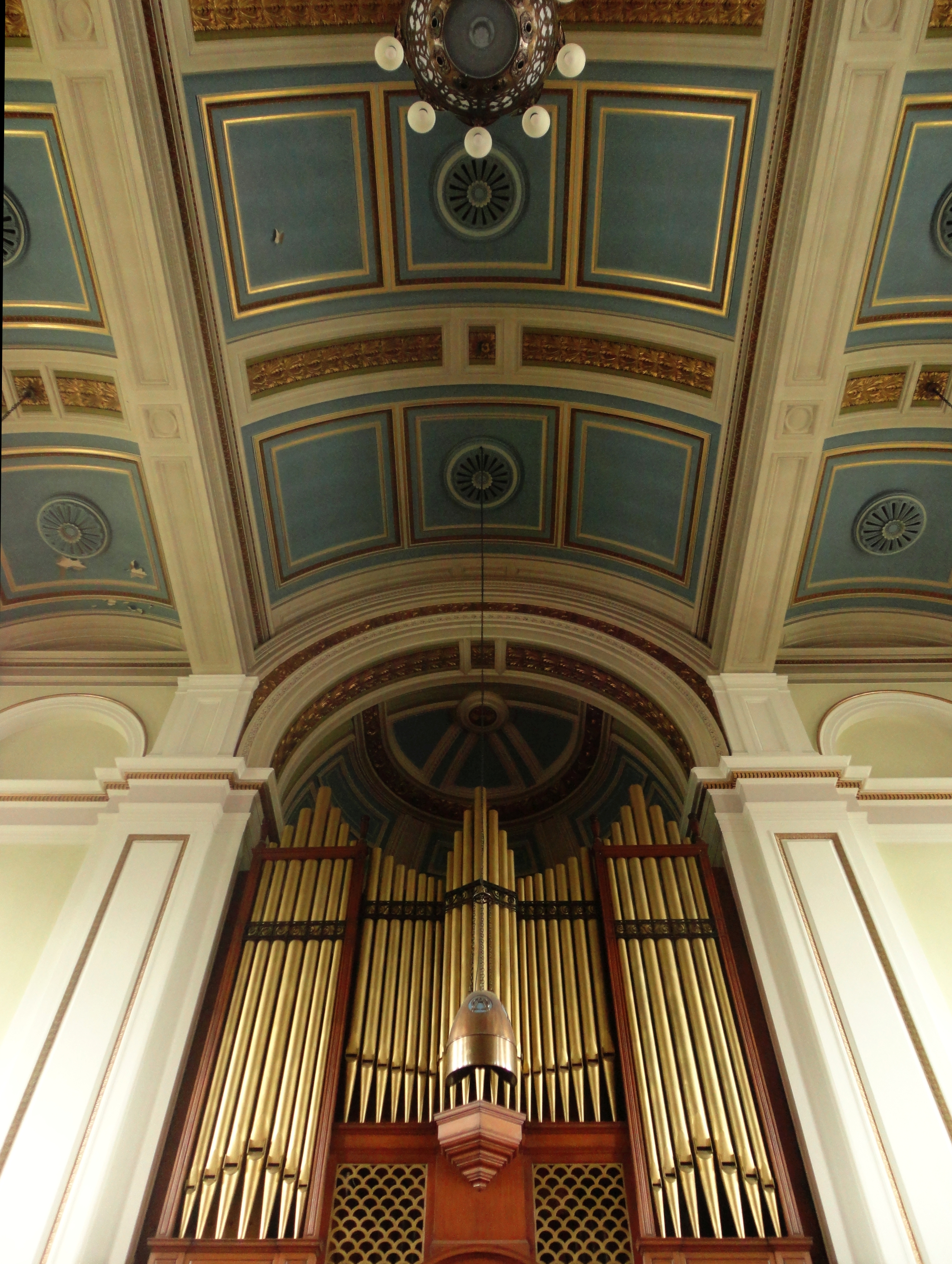
Wellington Church Organ

The building was designed by the architect Thomas Lennox Watson and built between 1883 and 1884 for the United Presbyterian Church of Scotland ("U.P."), which joined with the Free Church of Scotland to become the United Free Church of Scotland in 1900.

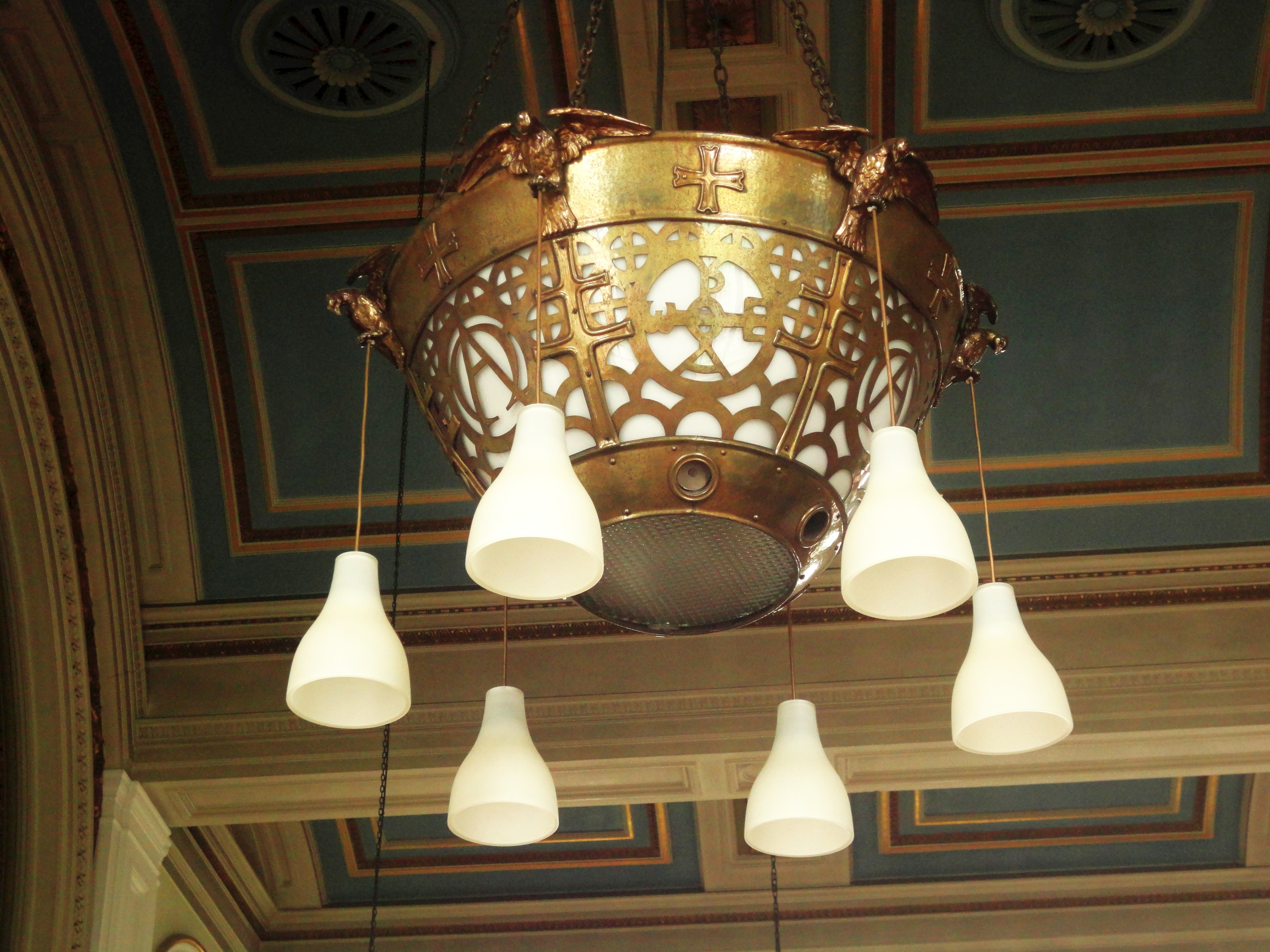
Brass chandelier

The exterior of church is notable for its magnificent neoclassical portico, complete with a colonnade of Corinthian columns in the style of an ancient Graecian temple. This neoclassical architecture was much favoured by United Presbyterian Church, in contrast to the Gothic Revival favoured by most other churches in the Victorian era.

== History ==
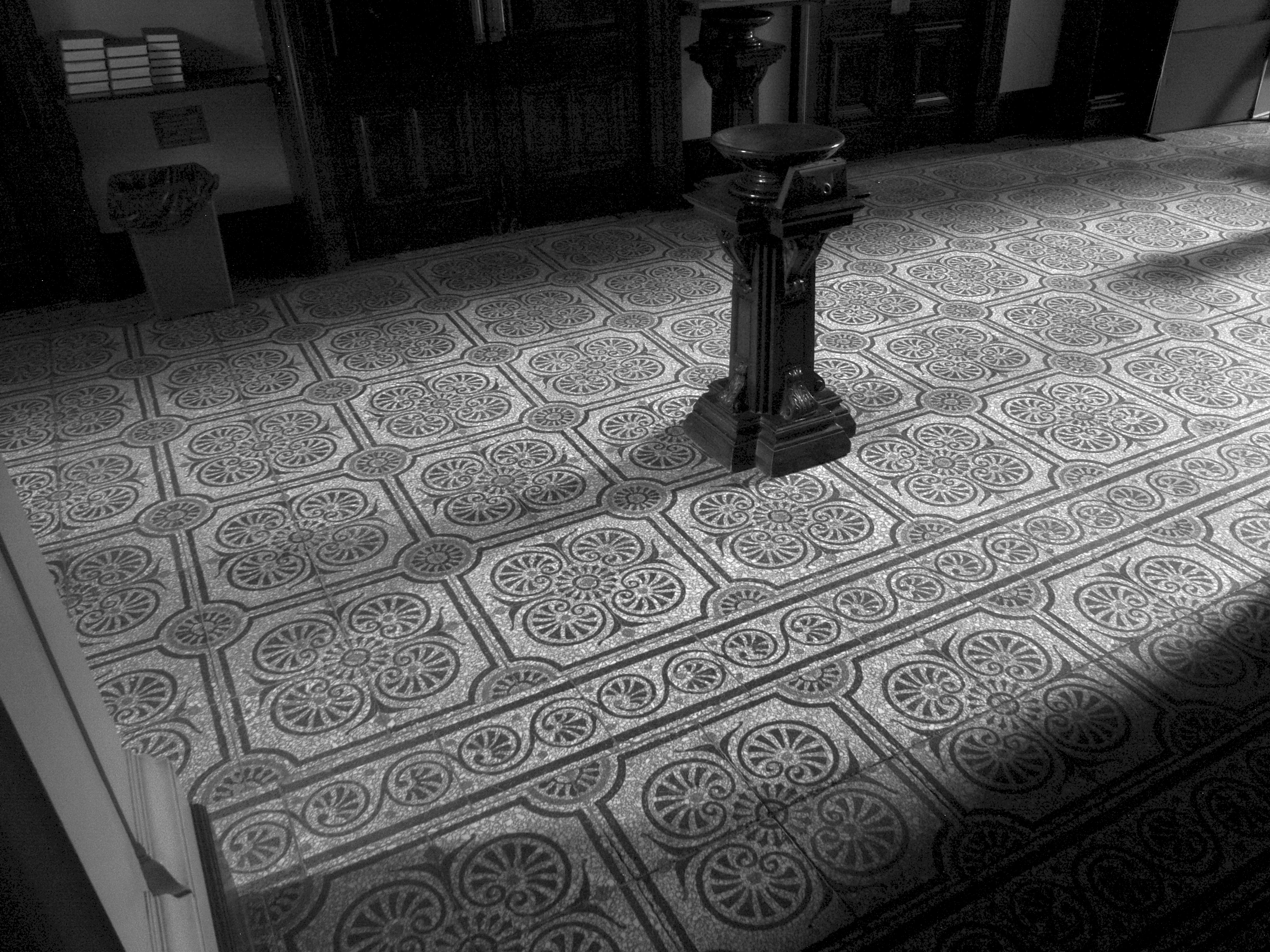
Wellington Church Entrance

The church's congregation was founded in 1792 as an "Anti-Burgher" congregation, which in 1820 became part of the United Secession Church (and in turn U.P. from 1847).

In 1828, they opened their own church building in Wellington Street near the centre of Glasgow. The congregation had outgrown this by the 1880s, so the church commissioned a new building at the junction of Southpark Avenue and University Avenue on Gilmorehill, opposite the university which had moved from the city centre the previous decade. Given that the United Presbyterian Church had no parish boundaries it was not uncommon for U.P. congregations to relocate.

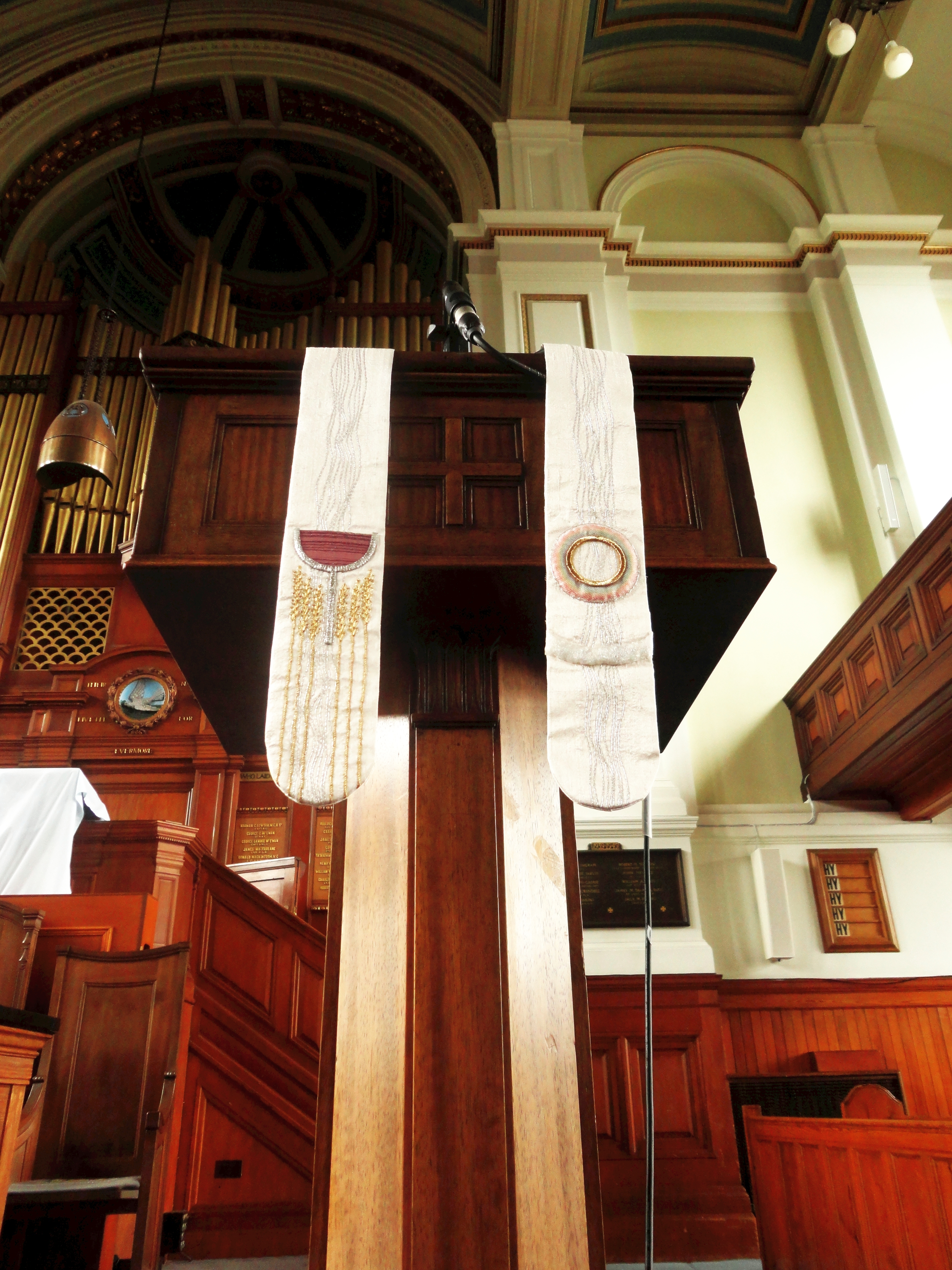
Lectern fall

== Current work ==
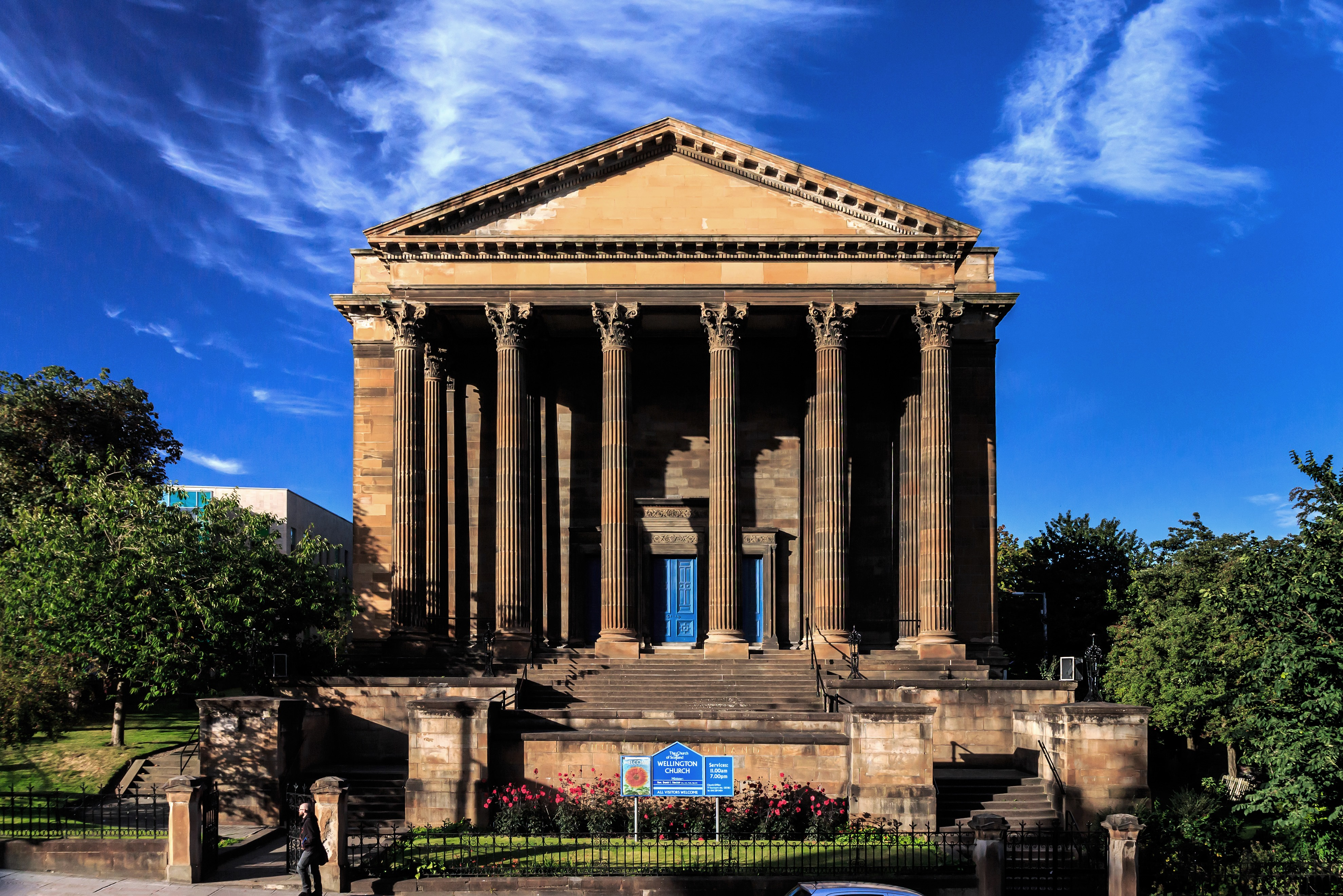
The front of the Wellington Church

The church ministers to the surrounding Hillhead community, and to the staff and student body of the university which has grown to surround the church's site. Although the university maintains its own chapel, the University of Glasgow Memorial Chapel, in the nearby Gilbert-Scott buildings, the Wellington hosts both religious and secular university events. The church also hosts musical concerts, and recitals played on its original Forster and Andrews pipe organ.

The congregation has been actively involved in social justice issues, such as the Make Poverty History campaign in 2005 and events surrounding the 2021 United Nations Climate Change Conference. The congregation won Scotland's eco-congregation award in November 2004. The Wellington building has hosted numerous social justice activist organizations in the past, such as Scottish CND.

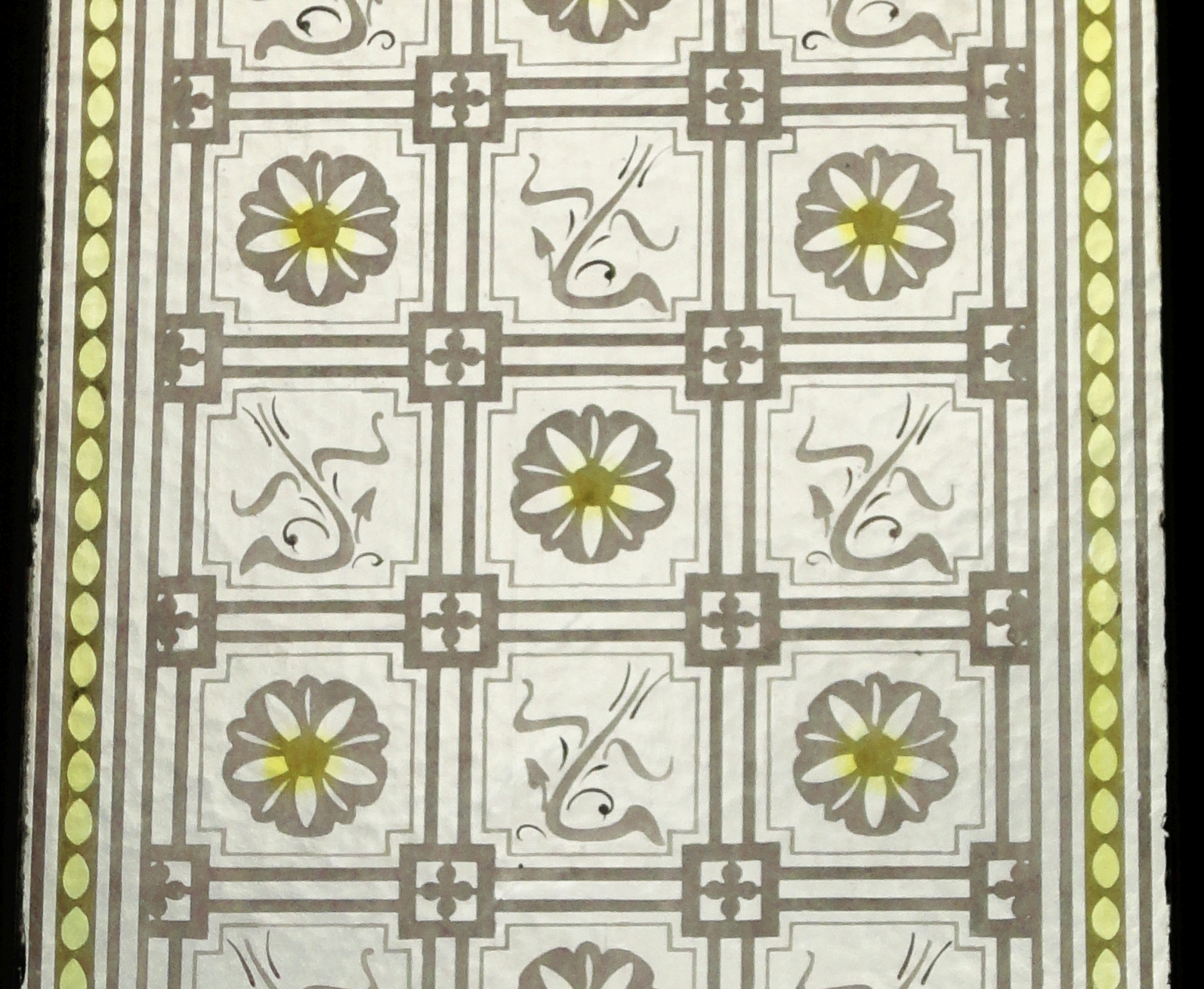
Detail of stained glass windows

Wellington operates the Crypt Café catering mostly to the local student and academic population at Glasgow University during weekdays from breakfast to lunch.

Since 2004, Wellington has hosted the International Welcome Club, an initiative to "extend the hand of Christian friendship to anyone new to the city - student, migrant worker, asylum seeker or visitor from anywhere" by offering informal free English language tuition online via Zoom on Wednesdays, face to face in the Crypt Café on Thursdays, and via other seasonal events.

In 2006, it was proposed that Wellington Church merged with the neighbouring congregation of Lansdowne Church. This was due to declining attendances at both congregations and the cost of maintaining the Lansdowne building. However, in June 2007 the congregation of Lansdowne rejected the proposed vote on the union at that time.

In 2022 an arrangement was reached with Glasgow University to use Wellington's sanctuary as a lecture theatre during term time.

Wellington Church is within the Church of Scotland's Presbytery of Glasgow.

== Ministry ==
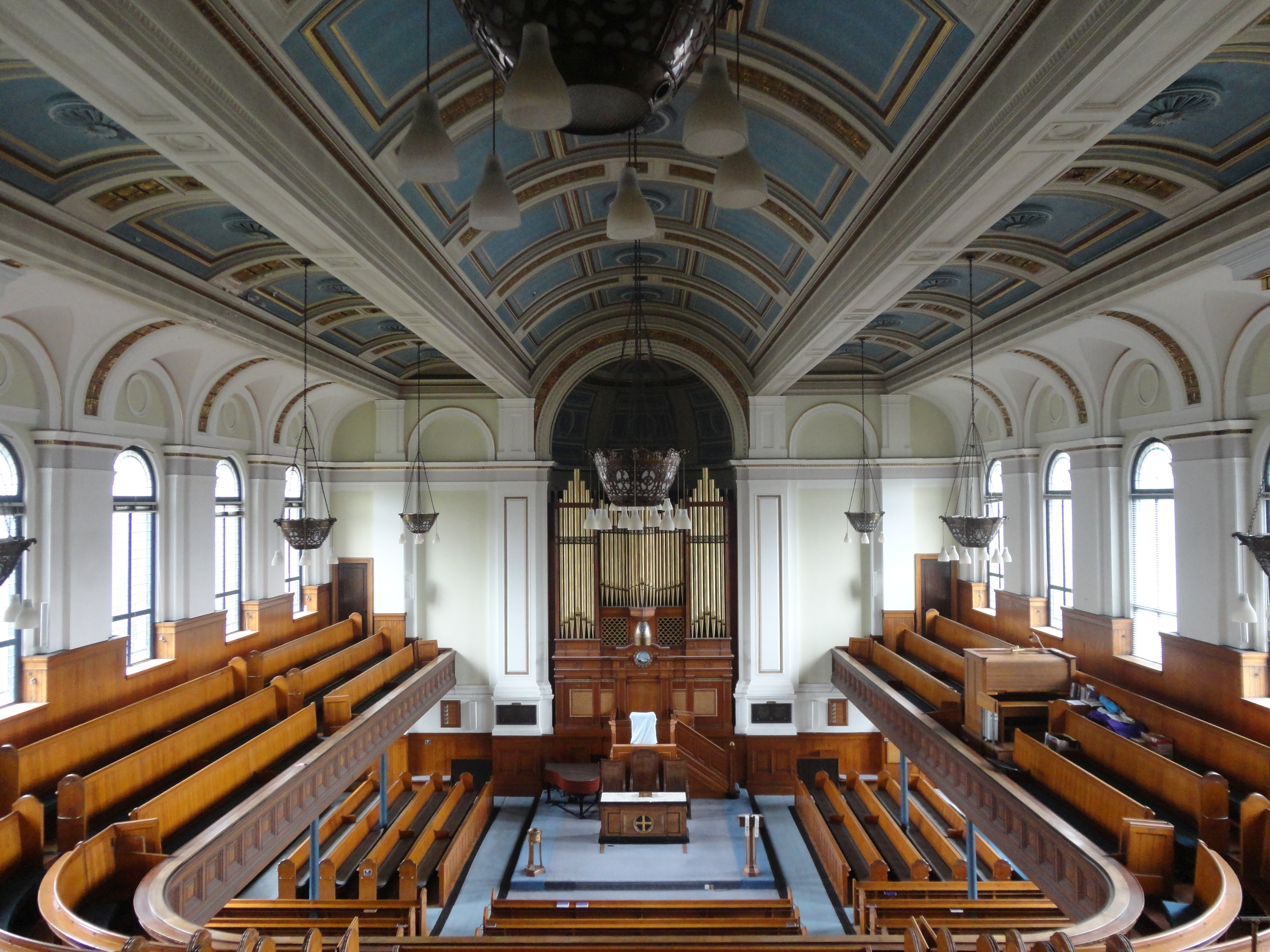
Wellington Church Sanctuary

Wellington's current minister is the Reverend Richard Baxter who has been serving as Transition Minister since February 2022. He was preceded in the interim by the voluntary minister Reverend Dr Roger Sturrock who now serves as Assistant Minister.

The previous minister was Reverend Dr David Sinclair who served until September 2017. He was inducted to the charge by the Church of Scotland's Presbytery of Glasgow on 29 May 2008. He was formerly Secretary of the Church and Society Council of the Church of Scotland, based in the Church of Scotland Offices in Edinburgh. Sinclair was the Presbytery of Glasgow's Moderator for the Session 2013/2014.

The prior minister was the Reverend Leith Fisher, who retired in October 2006 and died on 13 March 2009, following a road collision on the Isle of Arran. His memorial service held at Wellington was attended by over 1,000 people and was conducted by the Right Reverend David Lunan, Moderator of the General Assembly of the Church of Scotland.

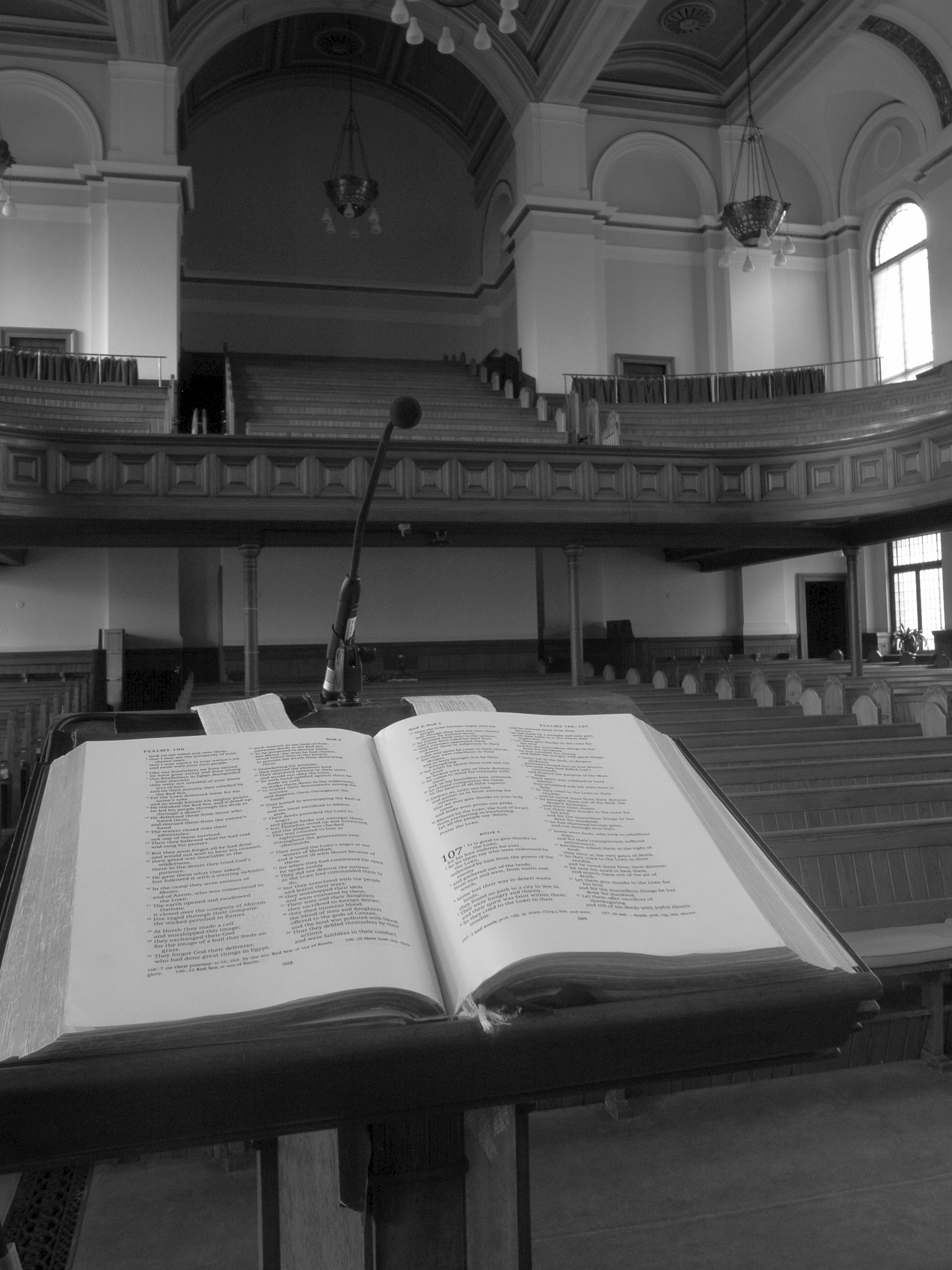
Reader's lectern

Former ministers include: the Very Rev Ernest David Jarvis DD, minister of Wellington 1929 to 1958 and Moderator of the General Assembly of the Church of Scotland in 1954; and Reverend Maxwell Craig who served between 1973 and 1989.

== See also ==
- 1884 in architecture
- List of Category A listed buildings in Glasgow
- List of Church of Scotland parishes

=== Other churches nearby ===
- Kelvinside Hillhead Parish Church
- Jordanhill Parish Church
- St John's Renfield Church
