= John Scott (botanist) =

John Scott FLS (5 April 1836–11 June 1880) was a Scottish botanist and gardener.

Born at Denholm, he was the gardener at Chatsworth House, Derbyshire, seat of the Dukes of Devonshire, before becoming foreman of the Royal Botanic Garden, Edinburgh, in 1859. He emigrated to India in 1864, with the patronage of Charles Darwin, becoming curator of the Calcutta Botanic Garden in 1865. While in India he carried out numerous botanical experiments and observations on behalf of Darwin.

He was elected a Fellow of the Linnean Society in 1873 and died at Garvald, East Lothian.
