= John Wood (Scottish courtier) =

Scottish courtier (died 1570)

- Born: Kingdom of Scotland
- Died: 15 April 1570; Kingdom of Scotland
- Cause of death: Homicide
- Known for: Administrator for the Earl of Moray

Master John Wood (died 1570), was a Scottish courtier, administrator and secretary to the Earl of Moray. He was assassinated on 15 April 1570.

== Career ==
John Wood was the son of Andrew Wood of Largo, and was educated at St Leonards College at the University of St Andrews, graduating in 1536 and so used the title "Master", referring to his degree. It has been suggested he became vicar of Largo.

John Wood's connection with Queen Mary's half brother, Lord James Stewart, afterwards Earl of Moray, began as early at least as 1548, when he accompanied him to France. About September 1560 he accompanied an embassy to England, recorded by Thomas Randolph, who in a letter of 23 September 1560 promised to send to William Cecil with Wood a copy of Knox's History of the Reformation, "as mykle as ys written thereof".

John Wood was a supporter of the Scottish Reformation, and at the first General Assembly of the kirk in December 1560 he was selected as one of those at St. Andrews "best qualified for preaching of the word and ministering of the sacraments." Wood accompanied Lord James in his embassy to Queen Mary in France in 1561; and Nicholas Throckmorton, the English ambassador at Paris described Wood as one "in whom there is much virtue and sufficiency." He recommended that Wood's devotion to the English interest should be rewarded with a pension.

=== Mary and the Earl of Moray ===
John Knox wrote that in December 1562 Wood distanced himself from the Assembly of the New Kirk to join with the "rulers" of the Scottish royal court of Mary, Queen of Scots. For three years, Wood became a magistrate, as an Extraordinary Lord of Session, as Lord Tullidavie, from 9 December 1562.

Knox wrote that Mary, Queen of Scots hated John Wood, because he, with John Wishart of Pitarro, "flattered her not in her dancing and other doings." According to Knox, when Mary was told her half-brother, John Stewart, Commendator of Coldingham's last words to her were that she should be a Protestant, Mary declared plainly that Coldingham's speech was invented by Wood and Wishart. During the Chaseabout Raid rebellion against Mary in 1565, led by the Earl of Moray, Wood was commanded to surrender himself to imprisonment in Dumbarton Castle within six days, and failing to do so, he was denounced a rebel. He was then deprived of the office of extraordinary Lord of Session, to which, by the title of Tulliedavie, he had been appointed; and he was not again restored to it except nominally. During the rebellion Wood was sent as emissary to Elizabeth I with vain requests for her assistance.

Wood remained in obscurity until Mary abdicated and Moray returned to power as regent, when he became his secretary, in preference to William Maitland of Lethington, and was employed in all his more confidential political missions. He was involved in making inventories of the queen's jewels and took several items to England.

After the battle of Langside, Mary fled to England. Wood was sent to London by Regent Moray in June 1568 "to resolve the queen of England of anything she" stood "doubtful unto". Mary sent her servant George Douglas to Elizabeth I with copies of Wood's letters, which she thought would discredit him. Moray declared that Wood had copies and translations of letters into the Scots language which proved to his satisfaction that Mary, Queen of Scots had consented to the murder of her husband Henry Stewart, Lord Darnley.

On 8 October 1568, John Wood arrived at York to join the conference discussing Mary, Queen of Scots, and the Casket letters. James Melville of Halhill wrote that Wood was "a great ringleader at York." Wood kept up a correspondence of his own with William Cecil, the English Secretary of State. At the subsequent Hampton Court conference he made a show of reluctance in presenting the accusation against the queen, but allowed it to be plucked out of his hands by the bishop of Orkney, who presented it to the English council.

After the return of Moray to Scotland in 1569, and as a follow-up to the conferences, Wood was again sent on an embassy to England in March 1569, and returned in June 1569. His embassy was intended to assist in exposing the intrigues of the Duke of Norfolk and his secret negotiations with the Queen of Scots. To raise his status in order that he might have "ane honorable style, to set out the better his embassage", according to James Melville he used indirect methods to obtain from the Regent the bishopric of Moray. On his return to Scotland he gave a report to the Privy Council of his proceedings, and on the motion of the Regent, he was thanked and discharged. Wood also worked through the inventories of the queen with Moray's servant James Murray and Mary's servant Servais de Condé.

In a propaganda piece circulated by his party's enemies in January 1570, known as the Pretended Conference, a Machiavellian speech was attributed to John Wood urging Regent Moray to ruthless action against his adversaries and to use any means possible to increase his popular support.

Wood wrote to Cecil from Manderston on 31 October 1569 describing the success of Moray's military mission to the west of Scotland.

=== Assassinations ===
In January 1570, when Moray was about to pass through Linlithgow, Wood was sent by Agnes Keith, Countess of Moray to warn her husband of a plot for his assassination, but the warning was unheeded. Wood continued working as the special "serviteur" of Agnes Keith who was pregnant, and had helped arrange Moray's funeral, and made the contract for the Regent's tomb . Agnes Keith had been seeking permission for John and her other servants to find refuge in England.

In March, he managed the departure of the servant Nageir the Moor from Leith and visited the Countess's infant daughter at Lochleven Castle. He wrote to Agnes on 4 April 1570 that he was going to Glasgow, and then returning to see her, and in case any accident came his way, his brother James Wood had her business documents.

In April 1570 John Wood visited Sir William Douglas at Loch Leven. At Lochleven Castle, Wood spoke to Margret Erskine, Lady Lochleven. She was looking after Agnes Keith's daughter. The child was "merry and very lusty". Her nurse was pregnant and wanted go home. In Edinburgh Sir William Douglas helped Wood check the coffers containing Agnes Keith's clothes at Holyrood Palace. Wood went on to St Andrews on 4 April.

John Wood was killed on 15 April 1570.

Arthur Forbes, the laird of Reres in Kilconquhar parish in Fife, and his son John Forbes were later charged for their part in the murder. The Hamilton family were accused of Wood's murder in a propaganda work attributed to George Buchanan called the Exhortation against the Hamiltons, which says that his enemies "fetched men out of Teviotdale to Fife to slay Maister John Wood".

George Buchanan, in his Admonitioun to the Trew Lordis (Robert Lekprevick: Stirling, 1571), wrote that Wood was assassinated "for na uther caus, bot for being ane gude servand to the crowne and to the Regent his maister". Buchanan also wrote that Wood was slain by "boucheouris counductit out of Tevidaill", butchers brought from Teviotdale".

== Sources ==
- Henderson, Thomas Finlayson. "Wood, John (d.1570)" . In Lee, Sidney (ed.). Dictionary of National Biography. Vol. 62. London: Smith, Elder & Co. pp. 361–362.
