= Cockpen and Carrington Parish Church =

Church in Midlothian, Scotland

Coordinates: 55.86616°N 3.08921°W

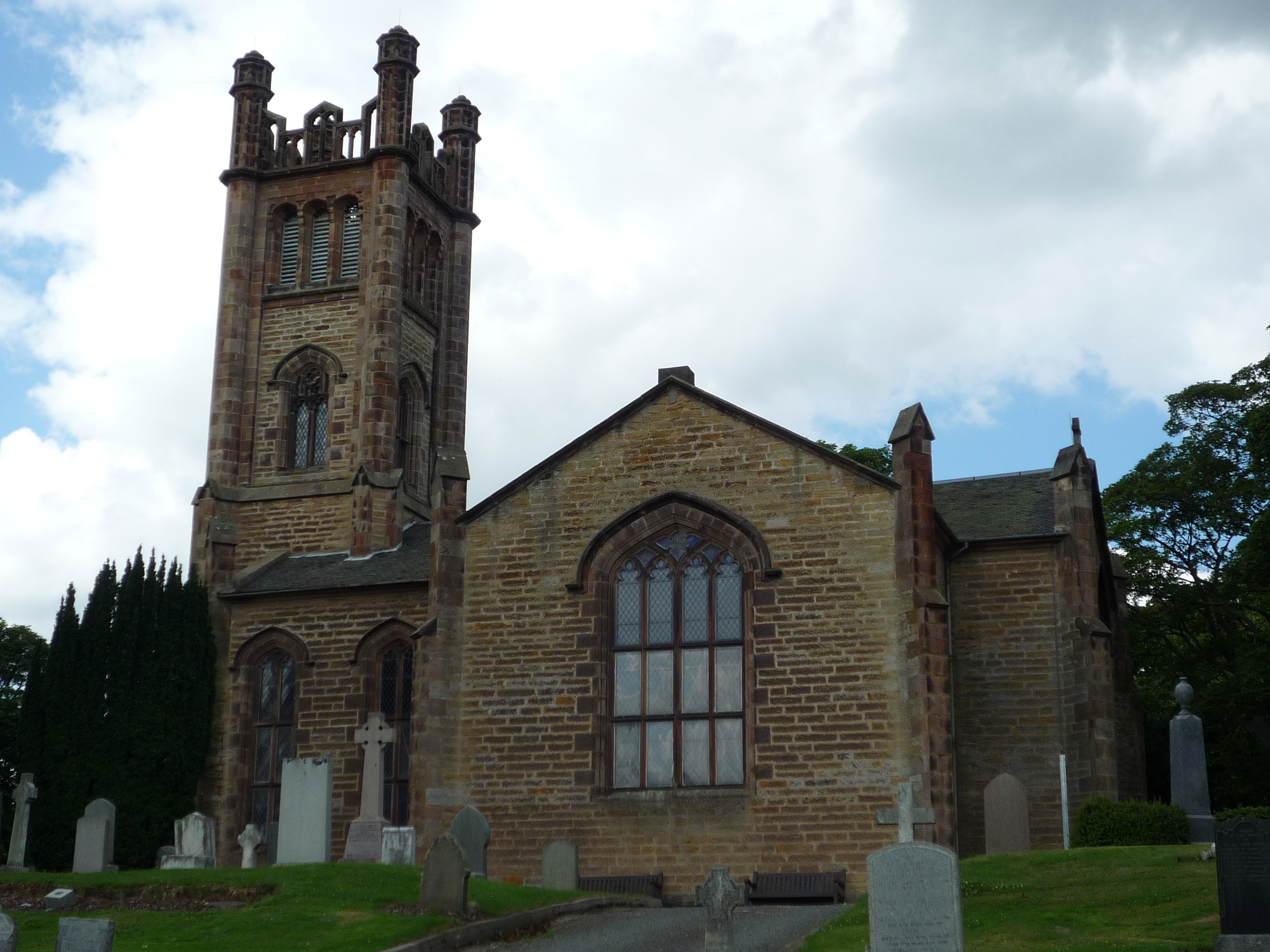

Cockpen and Carrington Parish Church is located to the south of the town of Bonnyrigg in Midlothian, Scotland. It is a congregation of the Church of Scotland. The parish includes the south side of the town of Bonnyrigg (including the new housing development at Hopefield), plus the rural area to the south of the town (including the village of Carrington).

The current arrangement dates from 1975, when the parish churches of Cockpen and Carrington were united (and the former Carrington Parish Church ceased to be used). The former Carrington Parish Church building was built in 1711 (and has now been adapted for use as an open plan office); until 1975 it was linked with Temple Parish Church in Midlothian (which is also now closed).

Cockpen Parish Church (now Cockpen and Carrington Parish Church) was designed in 1816 by Richard Crichton and built by his apprentices R & R Dickson from 1817 to 1820, following Crichton's premature death. It is a Category A listed building and is still in regular use. The current building replaced an older structure. The church's tower is unusually tall for a comparatively small church and its design was copied, on a larger scale, for Kilconquhar Parish Church in Fife.

== Ministry ==
Cockpen and Carrington Parish Church is linked with Lasswade and Rosewell Parish Church and share a minister. The linkage with Lasswade started in 1977 and Rosewell in 1991.

=== Recent ministers ===
- The Rev Wendy Drake (1992-2007)
- The Rev Matthew Ross (2009-2014)
- The Rev Lorna M Souter (2016- )
