= George Milligan (Church of Scotland) =

Scottish minister

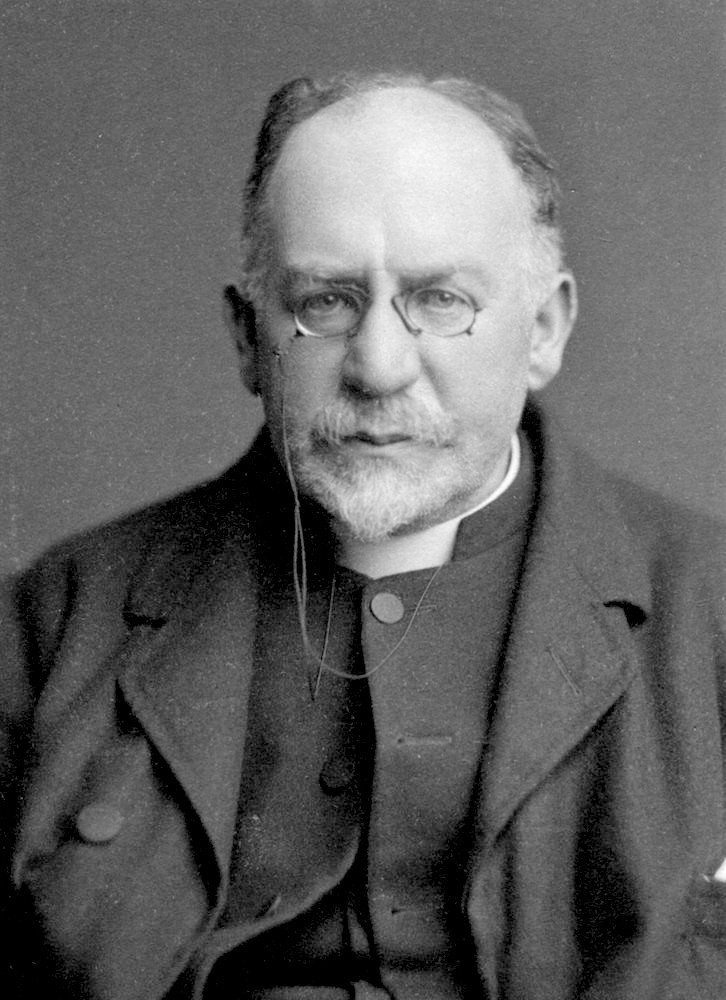
George Milligan

George Milligan DCL DD (2 April 1860 – 25 November 1934) was a Scottish minister of the Church of Scotland who served as Moderator of the General Assembly of the Church of Scotland in 1923. He was professor of divinity and biblical criticism at the University of Glasgow.

== Life ==
He was born in Kilconquhar in Fife, the eldest son of Annie Mary Moir, daughter of physician and writer David Macbeth Moir, and the renowned Rev Prof William Milligan. The family moved to Aberdeen in his first year.

He was educated at Chanonry House School in Aberdeen before going on to study Divinity at the University of Aberdeen, graduating with an MA in 1879. He followed this with postgraduate studies at the universities of Edinburgh, Göttingen and Bonn.

He was licensed to preach as a Church of Scotland minister in 1886 and worked for six months as assistant in Morningside, Edinburgh before being ordained as minister of St Matthew's Chapel in February 1887. During this period Milligan lived at 14 Morningside Park.

In 1894 he translated to Caputh in Perthshire. During his time there he was awarded a Doctor of Divinity in 1904 by the University of Aberdeen. In 1919 Durham University awarded him a Doctor of Canon Law.

From 1910 to 1932 he was Professor of Biblical Criticism at Glasgow University in succession to Rev Prof William Stewart. In 1912 he was the Croall Lecturer.

He was Moderator of the General Assembly (the highest position in the Church of Scotland) from 1923 to 1924 and was succeeded by David Cathels.

He died in Glasgow on 25 November 1934.

== Family ==
In 1891 he married Janet Rankine (d. 1898), daughter of Very Rev John Rankine, the minister at Sorn in Ayrshire, and together they had one son. After Janet's death and in 1902, he married Margaret Catherine, daughter of William Ellis Gloag, Lord Kincairney, Senator of the College of Justice. They had one son, George Burn Milligan.

== Publications ==
- The English Bible: A Sketch of its History (1895)
- The Lord's Prayer (1895)
- The Theology of the Epistle to the Hebrews (1899)
- The Twelve Apostles (1904)
- Men of the Bible: Matthew to Timothy (1904)
- St. Paul's Epistles to the Thessalonians: The Greek text with Introduction and Notes (1908)
- Selections from the Greek Papyri (1910)
- The Autographs of the New Testament in the Light of Recent Discovery (1910)
- The New Testament Documents, their Origin, and Early History (1913)
- The Vocabulary of the Greek Testament (1914)
- The Expository Value of the Revised Version (1917)
- Here & There Among the Papyri (1922)
- The New Testament and Its Transmission (1932)
