= Maxwell Craig =

Maxwell Davidson Craig (25 December 1931 – 26 September 2009) was a minister of the Church of Scotland and the first General Secretary of Action of Churches Together in Scotland.

== Background ==
Maxwell Craig was born in Halifax, West Yorkshire in 1931. He was educated in Bradford then at Harrow School and Oriel College, Oxford. After National Service as a Second Lieutenant in the Argyll and Sutherland Highlanders followed by several years as a Civil Servant he commenced a Bachelor of Divinity degree course at New College of the University of Edinburgh in 1961.

== Ministry ==
He served as minister at Grahamston United Church, Falkirk (1966–1973), Wellington Church, Glasgow (1973–1989) and St Columba's Church, Bridge of Don, Aberdeen (1989–1990). He was convener of the Church and Nation Committee of the Church of Scotland between 1984 and 1988. In 1990 he was appointed as the first General Secretary of Action of Churches Together in Scotland, serving until 1999. He was appointed as a chaplain to the Queen in 1986. Between 1999 and 2000 he served as minister at St Andrew's Church, Jerusalem.

Craig was married with four children.
