= David Cathels =

Church of Scotland minister

- Born: 1853
- Died: June 1925 (aged 71–72); Hawick, Scotland
- Occupation: Church of Scotland minister
- Known for: Moderator of the General Assembly (1924)

Moderator of the General Assembly of the Church of Scotland
- In office 1924–1924
- Preceded by: Very Rev George Milligan
- Succeeded by: Very Rev John White

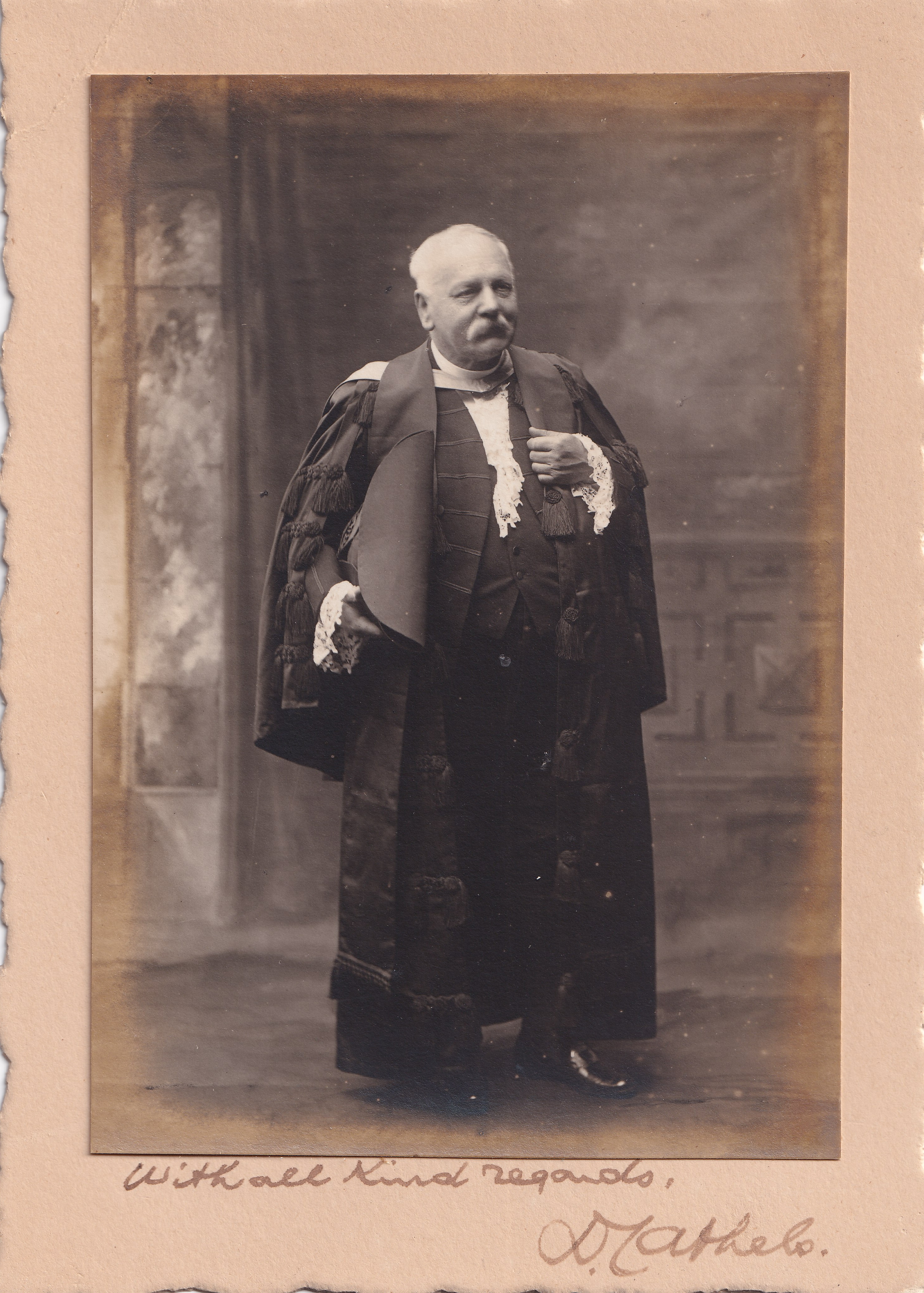
David Cathels

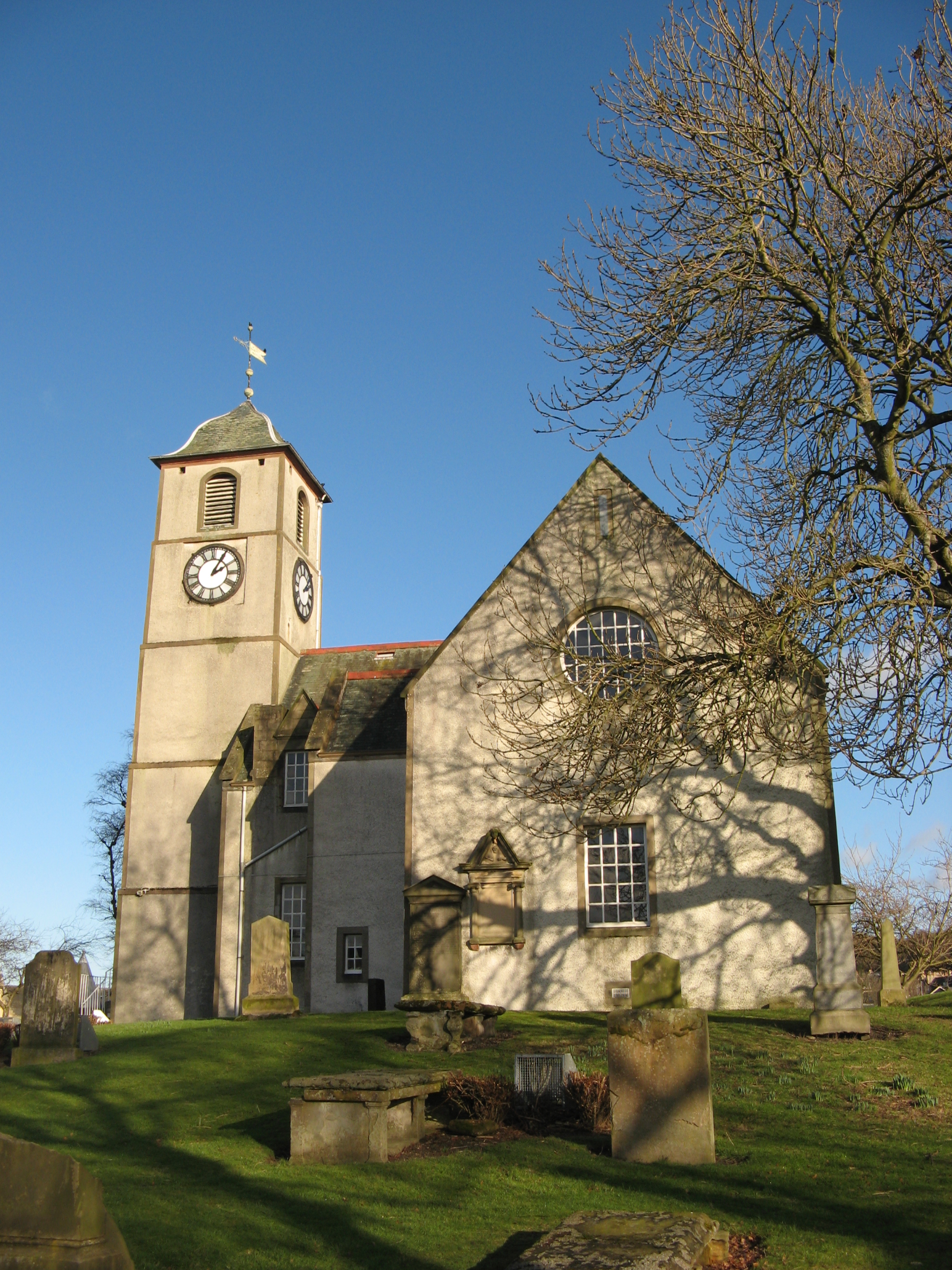
St Marys, Hawick

David Cathels (1853–1925) was a Church of Scotland minister. He served as Moderator of the General Assembly of the Church of Scotland in 1924.

== Life ==
Ordained 22 February 1882 to Kirkton in the Scottish Borders. Translated and Admitted to Hawick 18 May 1892.

In 1880 he is listed as the Worshipful Master of a Freemason Lodge.

For most of his life he was minister of Hawick, from around 1885 until death.

In 1924 he succeeded Very Rev George Milligan as Moderator.

He died in the manse at Hawick in June 1925. His position as Moderator was filled by Very Rev John White of South Leith Parish Church.

== Family ==
David Cathels was father to the Reverend Louis Patrick Cathels (d. 1939), who was minister of Peterhead.

== Publications ==
According to a 1908 bibliography of books relating to or published in Hawick, Cathels wrote the following works:

- Ourselves and Our Times (1887)
- Christian Manhood (1889)
- Landmarks: A Common Riding Sermon (1895)
- Honour the King (1897)
- The Reformation and John Knox 8 volumes (1905)
