= Kilconquhar =

Village and parish in Fife, Scotland

Coordinates: 56°12′N 2°49′W

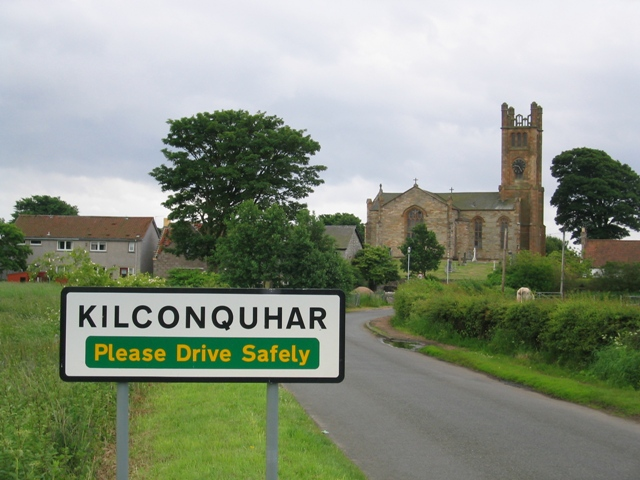
Sign to the village.

Kilconquhar (/kɪlˈkɒnkər/, locally also /kɪˈn(j)ʌxər/ kih-NYUKH-ər) is a village and parish in Fife in Scotland. It includes the small hamlet of Barnyards. It is bounded by the parishes of Elie, Ceres, Cameron, St Monans, Carnbee, Newburn and Largo. It is approximately 9 miles from north to south. Much of the land is agricultural or wooded. The village itself is situated inland, north of Kilconquhar Loch. Also in the civil parish are Colinsburgh and Largoward, the latter since 1860 being a separate ecclesiastical parish.

The coastal village and royal burgh of Earlsferry was formerly in the parish, but in 1891 the burgh and that part of the parish south of the (now disused) Fife Coast Railway line and Cocklemill Burn was transferred to the parish of Elie.

== History ==
The name, first recorded in the 12th century as Kilconcat, comes from the Gaelic cill Dhúnchadha, meaning "church of (Saint) Dúnchad". The reference may be to Dúnchad mac Cinn Fáelad, an 8th-century abbot of Iona. Alternatively, the second element may be Chonchaidh, referring to an otherwise unknown saint by the name Conchad.

Kilconquhar Castle was formerly owned by the Adams of Kilconquhar. Adam of Kilconquhar married Marjorie, Countess of Carrick to become the Earl of Carrick. Adam went to the Crusades with Prince Edward of England and died in Acre. His widow subsequently married Robert de Brus, 6th Lord of Annandale, who thus became Earl of Carrick and Lord of Kilconquhar. Their son was Robert the Bruce.

There was another castle in the parish called Rires or Reres, belonging to the Forbes family. Margaret Beaton, Lady Reres, was a companion of Mary, Queen of Scots, and her husband Arthur Forbes was involved in the assassination of John Wood. The ruins of the castle were demolished and cleared away in the 19th century.

In the 18th century the village was noted as a weaving centre. This industry employed 235 persons in 1856 but faded in the late 19th century. The population was at a high in 1836 of 558 but dropped to 350 in 1881. By 2011 it had fallen to just over 200.

== Parish church ==
Kil in the name implies an early Christian origin for the church, but no early remains or carved stones of the period have been identified. The situation of the medieval parish church, on a mound near a loch, is a typical one for early sites.

Kilconquhar Parish Church is within the Church of Scotland. The historic church building is still in regular use; it is an exact, but larger scale, copy, of Cockpen and Carrington Parish Church in Midlothian has an unusually tall tower for such a small parish.

Mention of Saint Conquhar, a Scottish Saint, is found only in the 15th-century Perth Psalter. His saint's day is noted as May 3.

The new church was planned in 1818 and designed by R & R Dickson in 1819, based on Cockpen Church which they had overseen the construction of, following the death of its designer, their employer Richard Crichton. The church opened in 1821. It contains several fine stained glass windows including "The Acts of Charity" by Ward and Hughes installed in 1867 and four biblical warriors installed in the 1920s by Mrs Andrew Grant in memory of her four nephews lost in World War I.

The church bell was donated by Robert, son of the Countess Dowager of Crawford, in the mid 19th century, but is an 18th-century bell, formerly in Greenwich Hospital.

The remains of Old Kilconquhar Church lie in the churchyard. This was originally called Culdee Church and is first mentioned in 1177. In 1200 Duncan, Earl of Fife bestowed revenues from this church to the Cistercian nunnery in North Berwick. The church was consecrated in 1243 by Bishop de Bernham. In 1499 Patrick Dunbar, Laird of Kilconquhar, set up an altar to "Our Lady of Pitie (Pity)".

== Other notable buildings ==
The local pub is the Kinneuchar Inn. It dates from the 18th century.

Lochside Farm, Allan Cottage and Woodlands all date from the mid 18th century.

== Notable residents ==
- James Drummond was minister for 1681 to 1699.
- Rev William Milligan was minister of the parish from 1850 to 1860 and his son George Milligan was born here in 1860.
- Rear Admiral William Duddingston was born at St Ford on the southern edge of the parish.

== Kilconquhar gallery ==
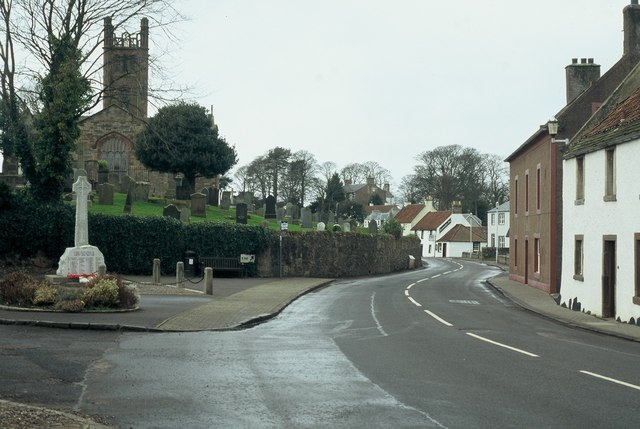
Kilconquhar village, church and war memorial

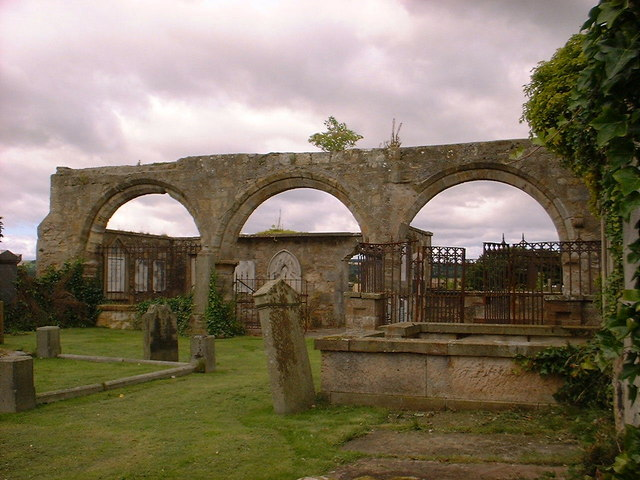
Kilconquhar old church ruins

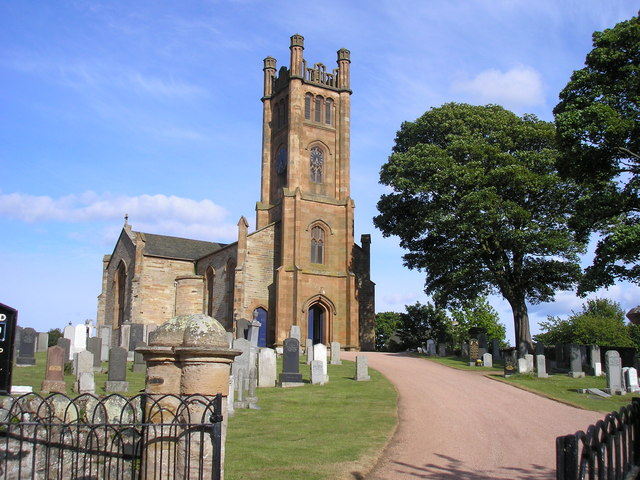
Kilconquhar Parish Church

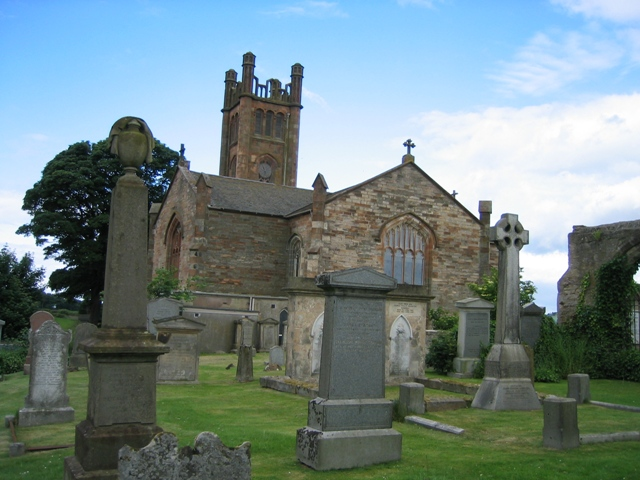
Kilconquhar old church ruin, and new church

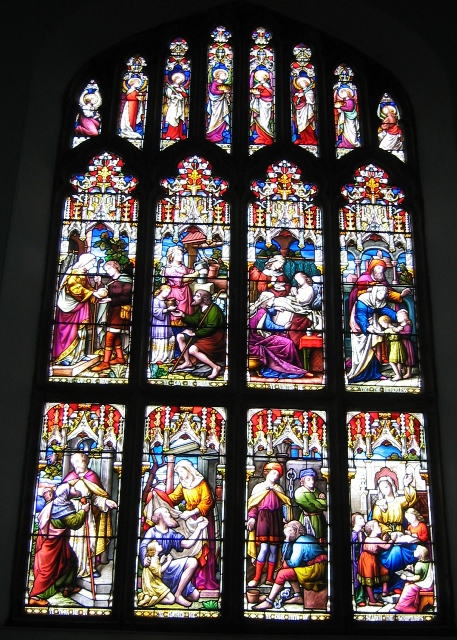
Kilconquhar Church east window

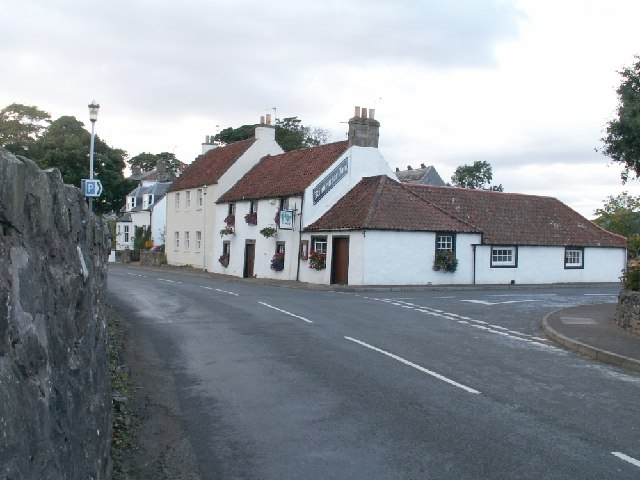
Kilconquhar Inn

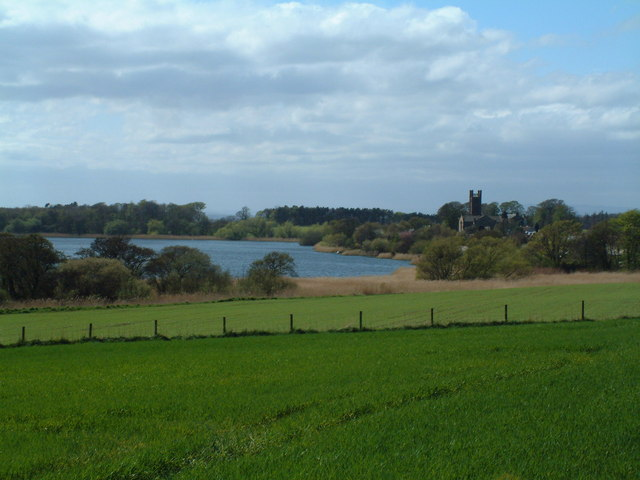
Kilconquhar Loch and Church

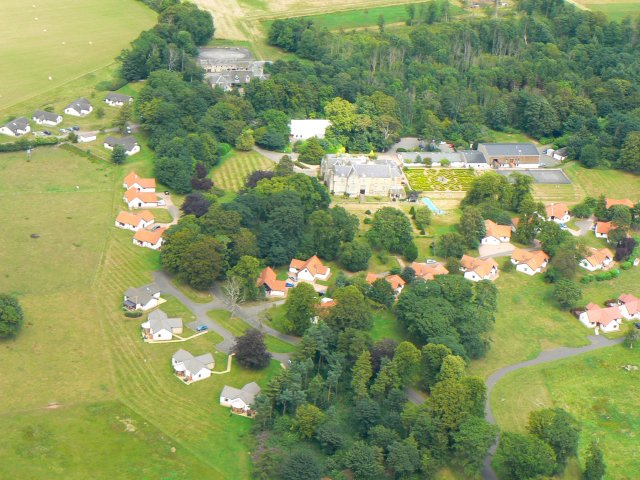
Kilconquhar Castle
