= Westgate Hall, Denholm =

Coordinates: 55°27′24″N 2°41′05″W

Westgate Hall

Westgate Hall is located in Westgate in the village of Denholm, Roxburghshire, in the Scottish Borders. It stands at the western and south-western approaches to the village. Dating from the 17th century (the date 1663 appears above the door), it is an example of a building of that period that was once common in Scotland and is now a category A listed building.

== History ==
When Sir Archibald Douglas succeeded to the barony of Cavers in the 1380s, he granted the lower part including Denholm, to Thomas Cranston. He was the ancestor of the Cranstons appearing in the Lay of the Last Minstrel, the poem by Sir Walter Scott. But in 1658, the baron of Cavers, also called Sir Archibald Douglas, repurchased these lands and added them back to the barony. The castle of the Cranstons in Denholm was either built anew or renovated, around 1664. The name Westgate Hall was used to distinguish it from another building, East Castle, on the east side of the village on the road to Jedburgh.

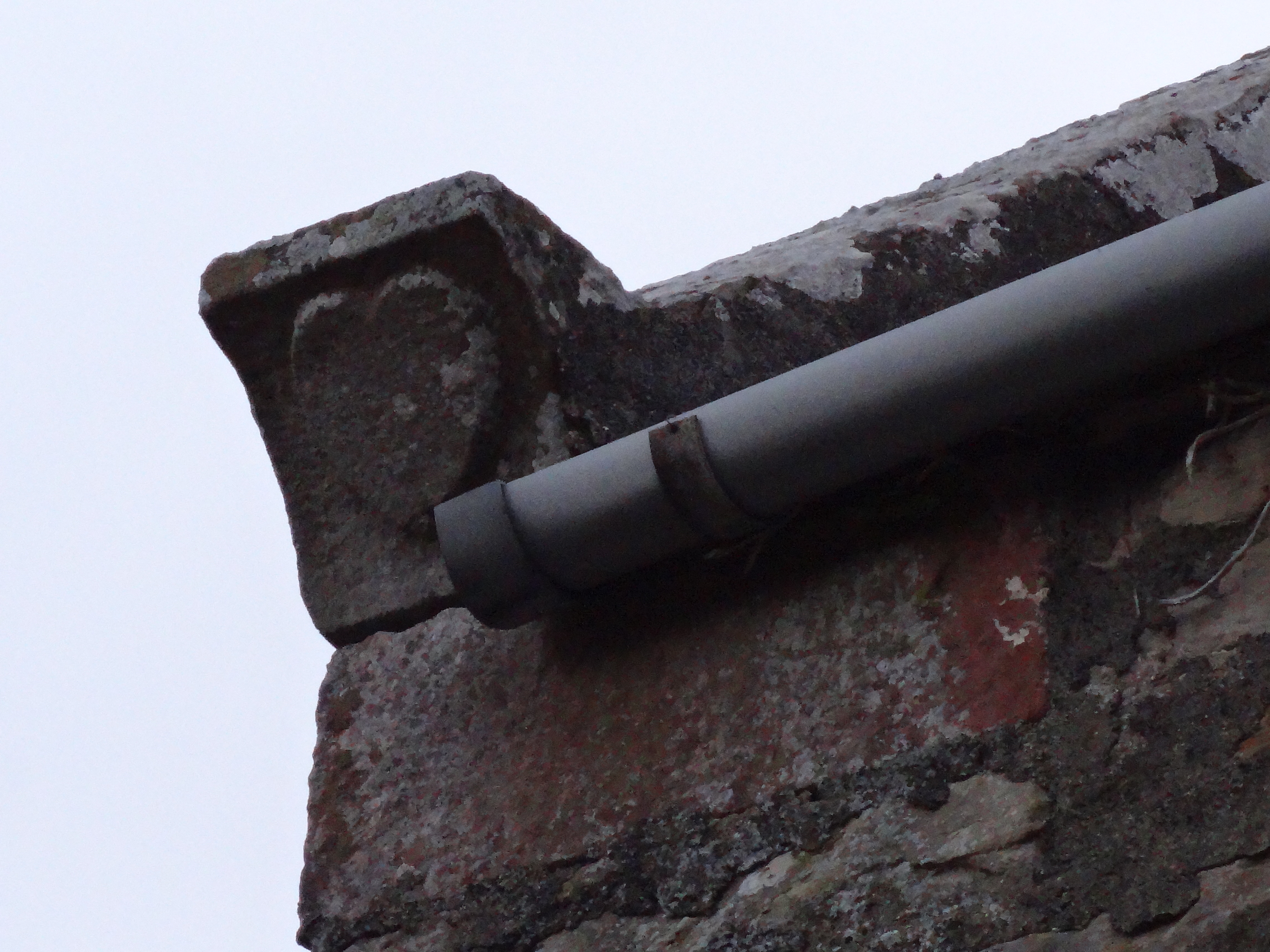
West skew-put bearing the heraldic heart of the Douglas family

It is a two-storey house, with a relatively recent extension and external staircase on the left side of the building, whose overall dimensions are 55 ft. by 23 ft. There are four skew-puts (the cornerstone that supports the coping of a gable). The western one bears the heraldic heart of the Douglas family.

Douglas and Skene panels in fireplace lintel

Internally at against the right (i.e.north) wall there is an original large fireplace, 5 ft. 10 in. wide. This includes a large lintel (2 ft. high) with two recessed panels. The left panel, which is octagonal, contains the initials S A D for Sir Archibald Douglas and below them the charges of his shield, namely a heart, with three mullets in chief. The right panel is oblong, containing the initials D R S for Dame Rachael Skene and below these letters a 'skean' or dagger between three wolves' heads couped.

As recorded in the Register of the Great Seal of Scotland, Charles I granted a charter to Archibald Douglas, heir to Sir William Douglas of Cavers, for certain properties including the town and lands of Denholm. Sir William and his family were barons of Cavers, encompassing the parish of Cavers. This Barony together with the lands of Cavers, and also the hereditary sheriffship of Roxburghshire, were possessed by the family of Douglas until the abolition of heritable jurisdictions in the 18th century.

In 1907 the top floor was made available as a meeting hall by the Palmer-Douglases, when the outside staircase was added, and was so used until the 1950s.
