= Action of Churches Together in Scotland =

Action of Churches Together in Scotland (ACTS) was a national ecumenical organisation of churches in Scotland, founded in 1990. It ran in that form until 2022 but continues as a charity supporting ecumenical initiatives.

ACTS was the successor to the former Scottish Council of Churches. It was one of the four national ecumenical bodies in the UK, with equivalent bodies being Churches Together in England, Cytûn in Wales and the Irish Council of Churches, plus Churches Together in Britain and Ireland. The ACTS office was originally located in Dunblane, then in Alloa and finally in Stirling.

In 2019, the General Assembly of the Church of Scotland announced that ACTS would be succeeded by a new body to be called the Scottish Christian Forum. In 2021 it was decided not to establish the SCF as a charity.

In 2024 the Scottish Christian Forum was recognised by Scottish churches as the main ecumenical organisation for Scotland. It is an umbrella term for the Ecumenical Officers Forum and the Scottish Church Leaders' Forum. ACTS continues in existence as a charity, its principal activity being to provide grant aid to new local or national ecumenical initiatives in Scotland. The new website for ACTS is https://acts-scotland.uk

== The member churches of ACTS ==
- Church of Scotland
- Congregational Federation
- Methodist Church in Scotland
- Religious Society of Friends (Quakers)
- Bishops' Conference of Scotland
- Salvation Army
- Scottish Episcopal Church
- United Free Church of Scotland
- United Reformed Church

== Secretariat ==
From May 2018, the interim general secretary was the Rev. Ian Boa (who succeeded the Reverend Matthew Ross, a minister of the Church of Scotland, who took up a new post with the World Council of Churches). The assistant general secretary (since 2011) was the Reverend Ian Boa of the United Free Church of Scotland; he succeeded the Revd Lindsey Sanderson of the United Reformed Church. There were also two programme officers to support the work of ACTS.

When first created, the office of ACTS was located at the former Scottish Churches House in Dunblane. In 2006 the ACTS office was moved to Forrester Lodge, adjacent to Inglewood House in Alloa, but in October 2015 it was relocated to Stirling, in a self-contained office within the headquarters building of Volunteer Scotland. Scottish Churches House was opened in 1960, closed in 2011 and subsequently converted into a hotel.

=== General Secretaries of ACTS ===
- The Rev Maxwell Craig 1990-1999
- The Rev Dr Kevin Franz 1999-2007
- Br Stephen Smyth 2007-2014
- The Rev Matthew Ross 2014-2018
- The Ian Boa (interim general secretary) 2018-2021

== Working as Churches Together ==
ACTS was a place for churches to meet, experience, reflect, share and act together. There were a number of projects which ACTS coordinates across Scotland. It was not intended that ACTS should develop into a "superchurch". Prior to 2003, four member churches of ACTS were part of the "Scottish Churches Initiative for Union" (which sought institutional unity - a project which ACTS was not part of), but a negative vote at the General Assembly in 2003 necessitated the withdrawal of the Church of Scotland from SCIFU. Henceforth, greater emphasis has been placed on the development of Local Ecumenical Partnerships.

The principle of being Churches Together was of central importance to the work of ACTS. Essentially, this is known as the "Lund Principle" (which was adopted in Lund by churches at the third world conference on Faith and Order in August 1952.) This states: "the churches should act together in all matters ... except those in which deep difference of conviction compel them to act separately"

== Governance of ACTS ==
The agenda of ACTS was set at a national level by the church denominations through their representatives on the "Members' Meeting". To comply with the requirements of the Office of the Scottish Charity Regulator, the legal responsibility for the oversight and governance of ACTS is vested in trustees, chaired by the convener of ACTS and supported by the Secretariat. As of 2025 the board of trustees remains in existence.

=== Conveners of ACTS ===
- 2009-2011 The Rev Fr Philip Kerr (Roman Catholic Church)
- 2011-2013 The Rev Dr Douglas Galbraith (Church of Scotland)
- 2013-2015 Mrs Helen Hood (Scottish Episcopal Church)
- 2015-2017 The Rev John Butterfield (Methodist Church)
- 2017-2019 The Very Rev Monsignor Philip Kerr (Roman Catholic Church)
- 2019-2025 Mrs Carole Hope (Church of Scotland)
- 2025- Revd Lindsey Sanderson (United Reform Church)

== Programmes ==
ACTS worked through its Programme Groups, Partner Group and Bodies in Association. Programme Groups (directly under the responsibility of ACTS) include the Scottish Churches Rural Group, Scottish Churches Anti-Human Trafficking Group and the Scottish Churches Education Group. Partner Groups (administratively and financially supported by ACTS, but with autonomous management) include the Scottish Churches Racial Justice Group. The ACTS Ecumenical Development Group promoted local ecumenism. Before restructuring in the early 2010s, ACTS had four "Networks".

== Scottish Churches' Committee ==
A separate body, the Scottish Churches' Committee, is responsible for liaison with public authorities on legal (rather than spiritual) matters - such as changes to legislation and the resulting effect on churches (such as planning law, changes to local government taxation, etc.). Seven of the nine members of ACTS are also members of the SCC (i.e. all but the two smallest, namely the Congregational Federation and the Quakers). The SCC also includes the Baptist Church, the Free Church of Scotland and several smaller Presbyterian churches. The Secretary of the SCC is the Solicitor of the Church of Scotland. It also co-operates with the UK-wide Churches Legislation Advisory Services (CLAS), formerly known as the Churches' Main Committee.

== See also ==
- ACT Alliance
- Conference of European Churches
- Ecumenism
- Scottish Churches Parliamentary Office
- Society, Religion and Technology Project
- The Council of Christians and Jews (CCJ)
- World Council of Churches
- World Communion of Reformed Churches
