= Kalemouth =

- Location within Scotland
- Coordinates: 55.540°N 2.463°W
- Country: United Kingdom
- Country: Scotland
- Council area: Scottish Borders

Kalemouth is a place in the Scottish Borders area of Scotland, where the Kale Water joins the River Teviot, near to Eckford, Cessford, Crailing, Kelso, and Roxburgh.

Kalemouth Suspension Bridge is a suspension bridge which crosses the River Teviot. There is also the Kalemouth Bridge which carries the A698 over the Kale Water immediately above its entry into the River Teviot.

== See also ==
- List of places in the Scottish Borders
- List of places in Scotland

== Sources ==
- The Structural Assessment and Strengthening of Kalemouth Bridge, Scotland, P. Jackson, Routledge
