= List of local government areas in Scotland (1930–1975) =

This is a list of local government areas in Scotland from 1930 to 1975.

The list contains the areas of local authorities as created by the Local Government (Scotland) Act 1929, as amended by the Local Government (Scotland) Act 1947. These areas were abolished in 1975 by the Local Government (Scotland) Act 1973 when a system of regions and districts replaced them. The district in which the abolished area was included is indicated.

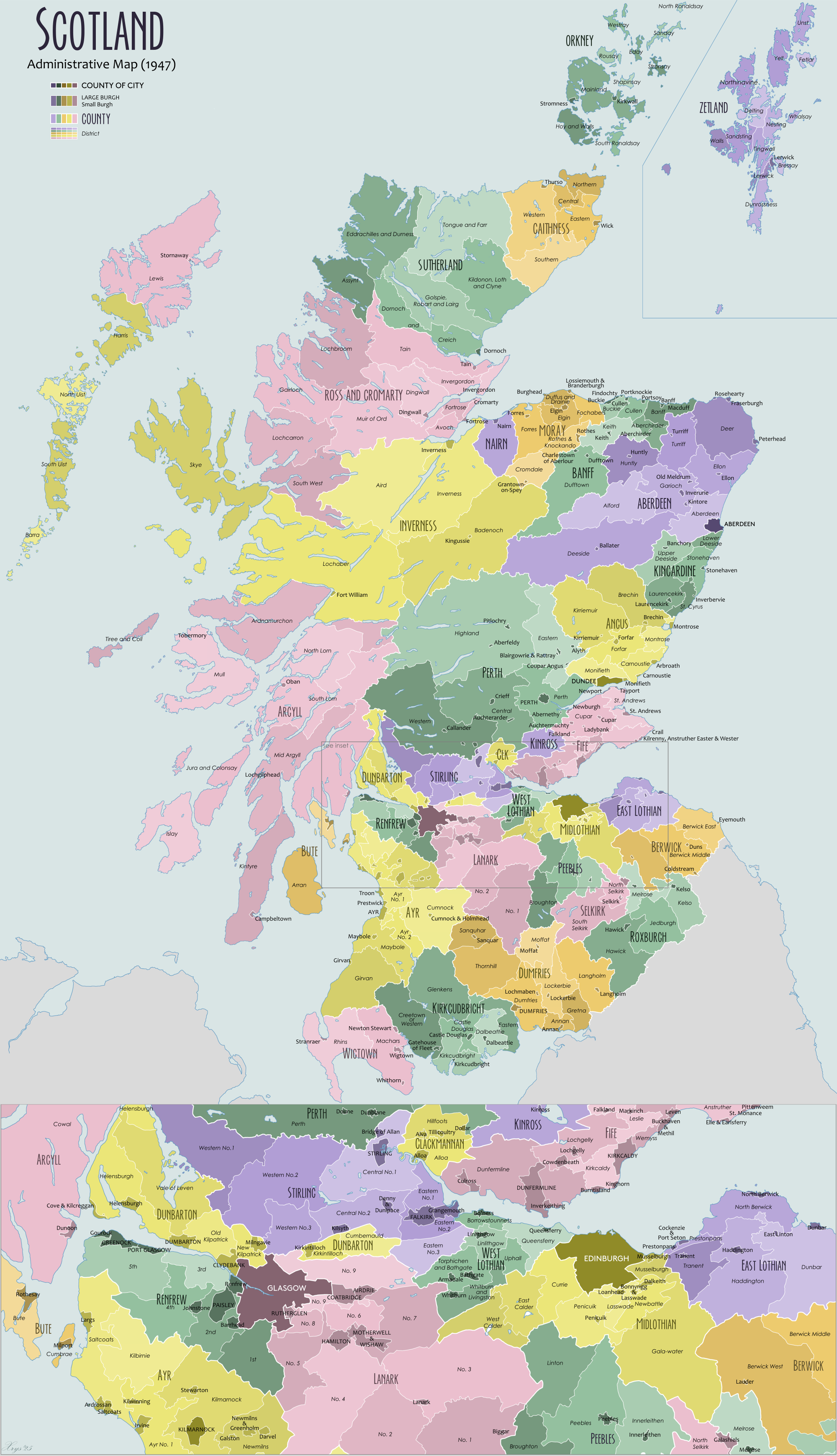
Administrative map of Scotland, 1947

== Background ==
From 1930 to 1975 there were the following types of local government areas in Scotland:

=== County-level authorities ===
- Counties of cities: These were the four largest burghs: they exercised the powers of both a county council and burgh. As such they were effectively unitary authorities. They were governed by city corporations headed by a lord provost.
- Counties: There were thirty-three counties covering the area outside the counties of cities. In the case of twenty-nine counties they were governed by a county council consisting partly of members nominated by the town councils of burghs in the county and partly by directly elected councillors for the "landward" areas of the county. The chairman of a county council was known as the "convener".
- Combined counties: Two small counties, Nairnshire and Kinross-shire were combined with the neighbouring counties of Moray and Perthshire for most local government purposes. In these "combined counties", there was a joint county council. The separate county councils continued to exist, however, and were responsible for minor local government functions.

=== Sub-county authorities ===
- Large burghs: The 1929 Act constituted twenty burghs as "large burghs". These towns were largely independent from the counties in which they were situated. The number of large burghs was later increased to twenty-one, with the addition of the new town of East Kilbride. The town councils of large burghs were responsible for all local services except higher-level activities such as police and education, which were provided by the county council.
- Small burghs: The remaining burghs became "small burghs", yielding many of their powers to the reconstituted county councils.
- Landward districts: The "landward" area of each county was that part not included in a burgh. County councils were required to divide this area into districts. This was done by grouping electoral divisions (the areas for which county councillors were elected). Each district was governed by a district council consisting of ex officio the county councillors for the divisions and a number of directly elected district councillors.

== Counties of cities ==
Burgh	Notes	1975 district
Aberdeen		City of Aberdeen
Dundee	Extended (at the expense of Angus) in 1932, 1939, 1946	City of Dundee
Edinburgh	Extended (at the expense of Midlothian) in 1954	City of Edinburgh
Glasgow	Extended in 1931 (at the expense of Dunbartonshire and Lanarkshire) and 1938 (at the expense of Dunbartonshire, Lanarkshire and Renfrewshire)	City of Glasgow

== County of Aberdeen ==
=== Small burghs ===
Burgh	Notes	1975 district
Ballater		Kincardine and Deeside
Ellon		Gordon
Fraserburgh		Banff and Buchan
Huntly		Gordon
Kintore	Royal burgh	Gordon
Inverurie	Royal burgh	Gordon
Oldmeldrum		Gordon
Peterhead		Banff and Buchan
Rosehearty		Banff and Buchan
Turriff		Banff and Buchan

=== Landward districts ===
District	Notes	1975 district
Aberdeen	Belhelvie, Bucksburn, Culter, Cults, Drumoak, Dyce, Echt, Fintar, Kinellar, Newhills, New Machar, Old Machar, Peterculter, Skene and Stoneywood areas	Most to Gordon; parts to Aberdeen (Bucksburn, Culter, Cults, Dyce, Newhills, Old Machar, Peterculter and Stoneywood) and Kincardine and Deeside (Drumoak)
Alford	Alford, Auchindoir, Clatt, Glenbuchat, Keig, Kennethmont, Kildrummy, Leochel Cushnie, Strathdon, Tough, Towie and Tullynessle areas	Gordon
Deer	Aberdour, Crimond, Fraserburgh, Longside, Lonmay, New Deer, Old Deer, Peterhead, Pitsligo, Rathen, St Fergus, Strichen and Tyrie areas	Banff and Buchan
Deeside	Aboyne, Birse, Braemar, Cluny, Crathie, Cromar, Glenmuick, Kincardine O’Neil, Lumphanan and Midmar areas	Kincardine and Deeside
Ellon	Cruden, Ellon, Foveran, Logie Buchan, Methlick, Slains, Tarves and Udny areas	Most to Gordon; part (Cruden) to Banff and Buchan
Garioch	Bourtie, Chapel of Garioch, Culsalmond, Daviot, Insch, Inverurie, Keith hall, Kemnay, Kintore, Leslie, Meldrum, Monymusk, Oyne, Premnay and Rayne areas	Gordon
Huntly	Cairnie, Drumblade, Forgue, Gartly, Glass, Huntly and Rhynie areas	Gordon
Turriff	Auchterless, Fyvie, King Edward, Monquhitter and Turriff areas	Banff and Buchan

== County of Angus ==
=== Large burgh ===
Burgh	Notes	1975 district
Arbroath	Royal burgh	Angus

=== Small burghs ===
Burgh	Notes	1975 district
Brechin	Royal burgh	Angus
Carnoustie		Angus
Forfar	Royal burgh	Angus
Kirriemuir		Angus
Monifieth		Dundee
Montrose	Royal burgh	Angus

=== Landward districts ===
District	Notes	1975 district
Brechin	Brechin, Careston, Dun, Edzell, Lethnot, Lochlee, Logie Pert, Menmuir and Stracathro areas	Angus
Carnoustie	Arbirlot, Arbroath, Barry, Carmyllie, Monikie, Panbride and St Vigeans areas	Angus
Forfar	Aberlemno, Dunnichen, Eassie, Forfar, Glamis, Guthrie, Inverarity, Kinnettles, Kirkden, Oathlaw and Rescobie areas	Angus
Kirriemuir	Airlie, Clova, Cotachy, Fern, Glenisla, Kingoldrum, Kirriemuir, Lintrathen, Ruthven and Tannadice areas	Angus
Monifieth	Auchterhouse, Benvie, Fowlis Easter, Kettins, Liff, Lundie, Mains, Monifieth, Murroes, Newtyle, Strathmartine and Tealing areas	Most to Dundee; part (Newtyle) to Angus, part (Kettins) to Perth and Kinross
Montrose	Craig, Farnell, Inverkeilor, Kinnell, Lunan, Maryton and Montrose areas	Angus

== County of Argyll ==
=== Small burghs ===
Burgh	Notes	1975 district
Campbeltown	Royal burgh	Argyll and Bute
Dunoon		Argyll and Bute
Inveraray	Royal burgh	Argyll and Bute
Lochgilphead		Argyll and Bute
Oban		Argyll and Bute
Tobermory		Argyll and Bute

=== Landward districts ===
District	Notes	1975 district
Ardnamurchan	Ardgour, Ardnamurchan, Morvem and Sunart areas	Lochaber
Coll	Coll	Combined with Tiree District in 1932
Cowal	Innellan, Inverchaolain, Kilfinan, Kilmun, Kilmodan, Lochgoilhead, Sandbank, and Strachur & Strathlachlan areas	Argyll and Bute
Islay	Kilarrow, Kilchoman, Kildalton, Kilmeny, Port Ellen and Portnahaven areas	Argyll and Bute
Jura and Colonsay	Colonsay, Jura and Oronsay	Argyll and Bute
Kintyre	Campbeltown, Kilcalmonell & Gigha, Killetan & Kilkenzie, Saddell & Skipness, Southend and Tarbert areas	Argyll and Bute
Mid Argyll	Craignish, Glenaray, Kilberry, Kilmartin, Kilmichael, Lochfyne, North Knapdale and South Knapdale areas	Argyll and Bute
Mull	Kilfinichen and Kilvickeon, Kilninian & Kilmore (excl. Tobermory burgh) and Torosay parishes	Argyll and Bute
North Lorn	Ardchattan, Ballachulish, Kinlochleven and Lismore & Appin areas	Most to Argyll and Bute; part (Ballachulish and Kinlochleven) to Lochaber
South Lorn	Glenorchy & Innishael, Kilbrandon & Kilchattan, Kilchrenan & Dalavich, Kilmore & Kilbride, Kilninver & Kilmelford and Muckairn areas	Argyll and Bute
Tiree	Tiree	Combined with Coll District in 1932
Tiree and Coll	Formed 1932 by merger of two districts. Tiree, Coll	Argyll and Bute

== County of Ayr ==
=== Large burghs ===
Burgh	Notes	1975 district
Ayr	Royal burgh	Kyle and Carrick
Kilmarnock		Kilmarnock and Loudoun

=== Small burghs ===
Burgh	Notes	1975 district
Ardrossan		Cunninghame
Cumnock and Holmhead		Cumnock and Doon Valley
Darvel		Kilmarnock and Loudoun
Galston		Kilmarnock and Loudoun
Girvan		Kyle and Carrick
Irvine	Royal burgh	Cunninghame
Kilwinning		Cunninghame
Largs		Cunninghame
Maybole		Kyle and Carrick
Newmilns and Greenholm		Kilmarnock and Loudoun
Prestwick	Royal burgh	Kyle and Carrick
Saltcoats		Cunninghame
Stewarton		Kilmarnock and Loudoun
Troon		Kyle and Carrick
Stevenston	Burgh created 1952	Cunninghame

=== Landward districts ===
District	Notes	1975 district
Ayr (No.1) Renamed Ayr	Ayr, Dundonald, Monkton, Craigie & Symington and Tarbolton areas	Kyle and Carrick, part to Cunninghame
Cumnock	Auchinleck, Mauchline, Muirkirk, New Cumnock, Old Cumnock, Sorn and Stair & Ochiltree areas	Cumnock and Doon Valley
Ayr (No.2) Renamed Dalmellington	Coylton, Dalmellington and Dalrymple areas	Cumnock and Doon Valley, part (Coylton) to Kyle and Carrick
Girvan	Ballantrae, Barr, Barrhill, Colmonell, Dailly and Girvan areas	Kyle and Carrick
Irvine	Dreghorn, Irvine and Kilwinning areas	Cunninghame
Kilbirnie	Beith, Dalry and Kilbirnie areas	Cunninghame
Kilmarnock	Dunlop & Stewarton, Fenwick & Kilmarnock, Kilmaurs and Riccarton areas Absorbed Newmilns District	Kilmarnock and Loudoun, part to Cunninghame
Maybole	Kirkmichael & Straiton, Kirkoswald and Maybole areas	Kyle and Carrick
Newmilns	Galston and Loudoun areas In existence 1970, absorbed by Kilmarnock District by 1975	N/A
Saltcoats	Largs, Stevenston & Ardrossan and West Kilbride areas Renamed West Kilbride on formation of burgh of Stevenston 1952	Cunninghame

== County of Banff ==
=== Small burghs ===
Burgh	Notes	1975 district
Aberchirder		Banff and Buchan
Aberlour		Moray
Banff	Royal burgh	Banff and Buchan
Buckie		Moray
Cullen	Royal burgh	Moray
Dufftown		Moray
Findochty		Moray
Keith		Moray
Macduff		Banff and Buchan
Portknockie		Moray
Portsoy		Banff and Buchan

=== Landward districts ===
District	Notes	1975 district
Aberchirder	Forglen, Inverkeithny, Marnoch and Ordiquihill areas	Banff and Buchan
Banff	Alvah, Banff, Boyndie, Gamrie and Gardenstown areas	Banff and Buchan
Buckie	Portgordon and Rathven areas	Moray
Cullen	Cullen, Deskford and Fordyce areas	Most to Moray; part (Fordyce) to Banff and Buchan
Dufftown	Aberlour, Cabrach, Inveravon, Kirkmichael and Mortlach areas	Moray
Keith	Boharm, Botriphnie, Grange, Keith and Rothiemay areas	Moray

== County of Berwick ==
=== Small burghs ===
Burgh	Notes	1975 district
Coldstream		Berwickshire
Duns		Berwickshire
Eyemouth		Berwickshire
Lauder	Royal burgh	Ettrick and Lauderdale

=== Landward districts ===
District	Notes	1975 district
East	Abbey St Bathans & Bunkle, Ayton, Burnmouth, Chirnside, Cockburnspath, Coldingham, Foulden & Mordington, Hutton and Reston areas	Berwickshire
Middle	Coldstream, Cranshaws & Longformacus, Duns, Eccles, Edrom, Fogo & Polwarth, Greenlaw, Ladykirk & Whitsome, Langton, Leitholm, and Swinton areas	Berwickshire
West	Channelkirk, Earlston, Gordon, Hume & Nenthorn, Lauder, Legerwood, Mertoun and Westruther areas	Most to Ettrick and Lauderdale; part (Gordon, Hume and Westruther) to Berwickshire; part (Nenthorn) to Roxburgh

== County of Bute ==
=== Small burghs ===
Burgh	Notes	1975 district
Rothesay	Royal burgh	Argyll and Bute
Millport		Cunninghame

=== Landward districts ===
District	Notes	1975 district
Arran	Island of Arran, Holy Island and Pladda Island	Cunninghame
Bute	Islands of Bute and Inchmarnock	Argyll and Bute
Cumbrae	Islands of Great Cumbrae and Little Cumbrae	Cunninghame

== County of Caithness ==
=== Small burghs ===
Burgh	Notes	1975 district
Wick	Royal burgh	Caithness
Thurso		Caithness

=== Landward districts ===
District	Notes	1975 district
Central	Bower, Castletown and Olrig areas	Caithness
Eastern	Keiss, Watten and Wick areas	Caithness
Northern	Canisbay and Dunnet areas	Caithness
Southern	Berriedale, Clyth, Dunbeath, Latheron and Lybster areas	Caithness
Western	Halkirk, Reay and Thurso areas	Caithness

== County of Clackmannan ==
=== Small burghs ===
Burgh	Notes	1975 district
Alloa		Clackmannan
Alva		Clackmannan
Dollar		Clackmannan
Tillicoultry		Clackmannan

=== Landward districts ===
District	Notes	1975 district
Alloa	Alloa and Clackmannan areas	Clackmannan
Hillfoots	Alva, Tillicoultry and Dollar areas	Clackmannan

== County of Dumfries ==
=== Large burgh ===
Burgh	Notes	1975 district
Dumfries	Royal burgh	Nithsdale

=== Small burghs ===
Burgh	Notes	1975 district
Annan	Royal burgh	Annandale and Eskdale
Langholm		Annandale and Eskdale
Lochmaben	Royal burgh	Annandale and Eskdale
Lockerbie		Annandale and Eskdale
Moffat		Annandale and Eskdale
Sanquhar		Nithsdale

=== Landward districts ===
District	Notes	1975 district
Annan	Annan, Cummertrees, Dornock and Eastriggs areas	Annandale and Eskdale
Dumfries	Caerlaverock, Dalton, Dumfries, Dunscore (west), Holywood, Kirkmahoe, Kirkmichael, Lochmaben, Mouswald, Ruthwell, Torthorwald and Tinwald areas	Most to Nithsdale; part (Dalton and Lochmaben) to Annandale and Eskdale
Gretna	Gretna, Half Morton, Kirkpatrick Fleming and Middlebie areas	Annandale and Eskdale
Langholm	Canonbie, Eskdalemuir, Ewes, Langholm and Westerkirk areas	Annandale and Eskdale
Lockerbie	Applegarth, Corrie, Dryfesdale, Hoddom, Hutton, Johnstone, St Mungo and Tundergarth areas	Annandale and Eskdale
Moffat	Kirkpatrick Juxta, Moffat and Wamphray areas	Annandale and Eskdale
Thornhill	Closeburn, Dunscore (east), Durisdeer, Glencairn, Keir, Morton, Penpont, Thornhill and Tynron areas	Nithsdale
Sanquhar, renamed Upper Nithsdale	Kirkconnel and Sanquhar areas	Nithsdale

== County of Dunbarton ==
=== Large burghs ===
Burgh	Notes	1975 district
Dumbarton	Royal burgh	Dumbarton
Clydebank		Clydebank

=== Small burghs ===
Burgh	Notes	1975 district
Bearsden	Created 1958	Bearsden and Milngavie
Cove and Kilcreggan		Dumbarton
Cumbernauld	Created 1968	Cumbernauld and Kilsyth
Helensburgh		Dumbarton
Kirkintilloch		Strathkelvin
Milngavie		Bearsden and Milngavie

=== Landward districts ===
District	Notes	1975 district
Cumbernauld	Condorrat and Cumbernauld areas. Combined with Kirkintilloch District 1968 on creation of Cumbernauld Burgh	N/A
Cumbernauld and Kirkintilloch	Croy, Dullatur, Twechar and Waterside areas Created 1968	Most to Cumbernauld and Kilsyth; part to Strathkelvin (parts of Twechar and Waterside)
Helensburgh	Arrochar, Cardross, Craigendoran, Garelochhead, Rhu, Rosneath and Shandon areas	Dumbarton
Kirkintilloch	Twechar and Waterside areas Combined with Cumbernauld District in 1968	N/A
New Kilpatrick	Garscadden, Millichen and New Kilpatrick areas Dissolved 1958 on creation of Bearsden Burgh	N/A
Old Kilpatrick	Bowling, Dunbarton, Duntocher, Hardgate and Old Kilpatrick areas	Most to Clydebank; part to Dumbarton (Bowling and Dunbarton), part to Bearsden and Milngavie (part of Hardgate)
Vale of Leven	Alexandria, Bonhill, Braehead, Jamestown, Kilmaronock, Luss, Millburn, Renton and Tulliechewan areas	Dumbarton

== County of East Lothian ==
=== Small burghs ===
Burgh	Notes	1975 district
Cockenzie and Port Seton		East Lothian
Dunbar	Royal burgh	East Lothian
East Linton		East Lothian
Haddington	Royal burgh	East Lothian
North Berwick	Royal burgh	East Lothian
Prestonpans		East Lothian
Tranent		East Lothian

=== Landward districts ===
District	Notes	1975 district
Dunbar	Dunbar, Innerwick & Oldhamstocks, Prestonkirk, Spott & Stenton and Whittingehame areas	East Lothian
Haddington	Athelstaneford, Bolton & Saltoun, Garvald and Morham, Haddington, Humbie and Yester areas	East Lothian
North Berwick	Aberlady, Dirleton, North Berwick and Whitekirk areas	East Lothian
Prestonpans	Gladsmuir North and Prestonpans areas	East Lothian
Tranent	Gladsmuir South, Ormiston, Pencaitland and Tranent areas	East Lothian

== County of Fife ==
=== Large burghs ===
Burgh	Notes	1975 district
Dunfermline	Royal burgh (claimed city status from 1856)	Dunfermline
Kirkcaldy	Royal burgh	Kirkcaldy

=== Small burghs ===
Burgh	Notes	1975 district
Auchtermuchty	Royal burgh	North East Fife
Buckhaven and Methil		Kirkcaldy
Burntisland	Royal burgh	Kirkcaldy
Cowdenbeath		Dunfermline
Crail	Royal burgh	North East Fife
Culross	Royal burgh	Dunfermline
Cupar	Royal burgh	North East Fife
Elie and Earlsferry	Royal burgh: before 1930 two separate burghs	North East Fife
Falkland	Royal burgh	North East Fife
Inverkeithing	Royal burgh	Dunfermline
Kilrenny, Anstruther Easter and Anstruther Wester	Royal burgh: before 1930 three separate burghs	North East Fife
Kinghorn	Royal burgh	Kirkcaldy
Ladybank		North East Fife
Leslie		Kirkcaldy
Leven		Kirkcaldy
Lochgelly		Dunfermline
Markinch		Kirkcaldy
Newburgh	Royal burgh	North East Fife
Newport-on-Tay		North East Fife
Pittenweem	Royal burgh	North East Fife
St Andrews	Royal burgh	North East Fife
St Monans		North East Fife
Tayport		North East Fife

=== Landward districts ===
District	Notes	1975 district
Anstruther	Crail, Kilconquhar, Kilrenny, Largo and St Monance areas Created from St Andrews District 1935: reabsorbed by St Andrews District between 1970 and 1975	N/A
Cupar	Abdie, Auchtermuchty, Ceres, Collessie, Cults, Cupar, Dairsie, Falkland, Kettle, Monimail, Rathillet and Strathmiglo areas	North East Fife
Dunfermline	Aberdour, Beath, Carnock, Charlestown, Culross, Dalgety, Dunfermline, Halbeath, Inverkeithing, Kelty, Kincardine, Oakfield, Saline and Torryburn areas	Dunfermline
Glenrothes	Created after 1970	Kirkcaldy
Kirkcaldy	Auchterderran, Auchtertool, Ballingry, Burntisland, Kennoway, Kinghorn, Kinglassie, Leslie, Markinch, Scoonie, Wemyss; Lochgelly and Wemyss Districts split off before 1948 Glenrothes District split off between 1970 and 1975	Most to Kirkcaldy; part (Gray Park) to Dunfermline
Lochgelly	Created from part of Kirkcaldy District by 1948	Most to Dunfermline; part to Kirkcaldy (Auchterderran, Denend, Kinglassie New Carden)
St Andrews	Cameron, Carnbee, Dunino, Kilconquhar, Largo, Leuchars, St Andrews and St Monance areas	North East Fife
Wemyss	Formed from Kirkcaldy District by 1948	Kirkcaldy

== County of Inverness ==
=== Large burgh ===
Burgh	Notes	1975 district
Inverness	Royal burgh	Inverness

=== Small burghs ===
Burgh	Notes	1975 district
Fort William		Lochaber
Kingussie		Badenoch and Strathspey

=== Landward districts ===
District	Notes	1975 district
Aird	Beauly, Fort Augustus, Glenmoriston, Kilmorack, Kiltarlity, Kirkhill and Urquhart areas	Inverness
Badenoch	Abernethy, Alvie, Duthil, Kingussie, Laggan and Rothiemurchus areas	Badenoch and Strathspey
Barra	Barra	Western Isles Islands Area
Harris	Harris	Western Isles Islands Area
Inverness	Ardersier, Boleskine, Croy, Daviot, Dores, Inverness, Moy & Dalarossie and Petty areas	Inverness
Lochaber	Arisaig, Glenelg, Glengarry, Kilmallie, Kilmonivaig, Mallaig, Moidart, Nether Lochaber and Small Isles areas	Lochaber
North Uist	North Uist	Western Isles Islands Area
Skye	Bracadale, Duirinish, Kilmuir, Portree, Sleat and Snizort areas	Skye and Lochalsh
South Uist	Benbecula, Lochboisdale and South Uist areas	Western Isles Islands Area

== County of Kincardine ==
=== Small burghs ===
Burgh	Notes	1975 district
Banchory		Kincardine and Deeside
Inverbervie	Royal burgh	Kincardine and Deeside
Laurencekirk		Kincardine and Deeside
Stonehaven		Kincardine and Deeside

=== Landward districts ===
District	Notes	1975 district
Laurencekirk	Fettercairn, Fordoun, Laurencekirk & Garvock and Marykirk areas	Kincardine and Deeside
Lower Deeside	Banchory-Devenick, Maryculter and Nigg areas	Most to Kincardine and Deeside; part (Nigg) to Aberdeen
St Cyrus	Arbuthnott, Benholm, Bervie and St Cyrus areas	Kincardine and Deeside
Stonehaven	Cookney, Dunnottar, Fetteresso, Glenbervie and Kinneff areas	Kincardine and Deeside
Upper Deeside	Banchory-Ternan, Durris and Strachan areas	Kincardine and Deeside

== County of Kirkcudbright ==
=== Small burghs ===
Burgh	Notes	1975 district
Castle Douglas		Stewartry
Dalbeattie		Stewartry
Gatehouse of Fleet		Stewartry
Kirkcudbright	Royal burgh	Stewartry
New Galloway	Royal burgh	Stewartry

=== Landward districts ===
District	Notes	1975 district
Castle Douglas	Balmaghie, Crossmichael, Kelton and Kirkpatrick-Durham areas	Stewartry
Dalbeattie	Buittle, Colvend, Kirkgunzeon & Lochrutton and Urr areas	Stewartry
Eastern	Irongray & Terregles and Troqueer areas	Nithsdale
Glenkens	Balmaclellan, Carsphairn & Kells, Dalry and Parton areas	Stewartry
Kirkcudbright	Borgue, Kirkcudbright, Rerrick and Tongland & Twynholm areas	Stewartry
Cree; Renamed Western	Anwoth & Girthon, Kirkmabreck and Minnigaff areas	Most to Wigtown; part (Anwoth and Girthon) to Stewartry

== County of Lanark ==
=== Large burghs ===
Burgh	Notes	1975 district
Airdrie		Monklands
Coatbridge		Monklands
East Kilbride	Became a large burgh in 1967	East Kilbride
Hamilton		Hamilton
Motherwell and Wishaw		Motherwell
Rutherglen	Royal burgh	Glasgow

=== Small burghs ===
Burgh	Notes	1975 district
Biggar		Lanark
Bishopbriggs	Burgh created 1964	Strathkelvin
East Kilbride	Burgh created 1963, became a large burgh in 1967	N/A
Lanark	Royal burgh	Lanark

=== Landward districts ===
District	Notes	1975 district
First	Carmichael, Crawford and Crawfordjohn areas	Lanark
Second	Blackwood, Douglas and Lesmahagow areas	Lanark
Third	Carluke, Carnwrath, Carstairs, Forth and Lanark areas	Lanark
Fourth	Avondale, Dalserf, Hamilton, Larkhall and Stonehouse areas	Most to Hamilton; part (Avondale) to East Kilbride
Fifth	Blantyre, East Kilbride, High Blantyre and Stonefield areas Abolished in 1963: East Kilbride became a burgh, remainder absorbed by Eighth District	N/A
Sixth	Belshill, Bothwell, Holytown, Newarthill, New Stevenston, Mossend, Tannochside and Uddingston areas	Most to Motherwell; part (Bothwell and Uddingston) to Hamilton
Seventh	Cleland, Dykehead, Harthill, Newmains, Dalziel-Overtown, Shotts Kirk and Stane areas	Most to Motherwell; part (Shottskirk) to Monklands
Eighth	Bankhead, Cambuslang, Carmunnock, Hallside and Rutherglen areas. Blantyre, High Blantyre and Stonefield areas added 1963 from abolished Fifth District	Split between East Kilbride (Parts of Cambuslang, Carmunnock and High Blantyre), Glasgow (Bankhead, part of Cambuslang, Hallside and Rutherglen) and Hamilton (Blantyre, Stonefield, part of High Blantyre)
Ninth	Bailieston, Bishopbriggs, Carmyle, Chryston, Garrowhill, Mount Vernon, New Monkland, Old Monkland, Springboig and Stepps areas Bishopbriggs became a burgh in 1964	Most to Monklands; remainder split between Glasgow (Bailieston, Carmyle, Garrowhill, Mount Vernon) and Strathkelvin (Chryston, Stepps)

== County of Midlothian ==
=== Small burghs ===
Burgh	Notes	1975 district
Bonnyrigg and Lasswade		Midlothian
Dalkeith		Midlothian
Loanhead		Midlothian
Musselburgh		East Lothian
Penicuik		Midlothian

=== Landward districts ===
District	Notes	1975 district
Currie	Currie, Ratho and Kirkliston areas	City of Edinburgh
East Calder	Kirknewton and Mid Calder areas	West Lothian
Gala Water	Borthwick & Temple, Cranston, Crichton & Fala, Gorebridge, Heriot and Stow areas	Most to Midlothian; part (Heriot and Stow) to Ettrick and Lauderdale
Lasswade	Melville, Pentland, Polton, Rosewell, Rosslynlee and Viewfield areas	Midlothian
Musselburgh	Inveresk, Newton and Craighall areas	Most to Midlothian; part (Inveresk) to East Lothian
Newbattle	Carrington, Cockpen, Dalkeith, Newbattle and Stobhill areas	Midlothian
Penicuik	Glencorse, Penicuik and Roslin areas	Midlothian
West Calder	Addiewell, Harburn and West Calder areas	West Lothian

== Combined County of Moray and Nairn ==
=== Small burghs: County of Moray ===
Burgh	Notes	1975 district
Burghead		Moray
Elgin	Royal burgh	Moray
Forres	Royal burgh	Moray
Grantown-on-Spey		Badenoch and Strathspey
Lossiemouth and Branderburgh		Moray
Rothes		Moray

=== Small burghs: County of Nairn ===
Burgh	Notes	1975 district
Nairn	Royal burgh	Nairn

=== Landward districts: County of Moray ===
District	Notes	1975 district
Cromdale	Cromdale and Inverallan areas	Badenoch and Strathspey
Duffus and Drainie	Drainie, Duffus and Hopeman areas	Moray
Elgin	Alves, Birnie, Elgin, New Elgin, Pluscarden and St Andrews areas	Moray
Fochabers	Bellie, Fochabers, Speymouth and Urquhart areas	Moray
Forres	Dallas, Dyke, Edinkillie, Forres, Kinloss, Moy and Rafford areas	Moray
Rothes and Knockando	Knockando and Rothes areas	Moray

=== Landward districts: County of Nairn ===
District	Notes	1975 district
Nairn		Nairn

== County of Orkney ==
=== Small burghs ===
Burgh	Notes	1975 district
Kirkwall	Royal burgh	Orkney Islands Area
Stromness		Orkney Islands Area

=== Landward districts ===
District	Notes	1975 district
Eday		Orkney Islands Area
Hoy and Walls		Orkney Islands Area
Mainland		Orkney Islands Area
North Ronaldsay		Orkney Islands Area
Rousay		Orkney Islands Area
Sanday		Orkney Islands Area
Shapinsay		Orkney Islands Area
South Ronaldsay		Orkney Islands Area
Stronsay		Orkney Islands Area
Westray and Papa Westray		Orkney Islands Area

== County of Peebles ==
=== Small burghs ===
Burgh	Notes	1975 district
Peebles	Royal burgh	Tweeddale
Innerleithen		Tweeddale

=== Landward districts ===
District	Notes	1975 district
Broughton	Broughton, Drumelzier, Skirling and Tweedsmuir areas	Tweeddale
Innerleithen	Innerleithen, Traquair and Walkerburn areas	Tweeddale
Linton	Kirkurd, Linton and Newlands areas	Tweeddale
Peebles	Eddleston, Manor, Peebles and Stobo & Lyne areas	Tweeddale

== Combined County of Perth and Kinross ==
=== Large burgh ===
Burgh	Notes	1975 district
Perth	City and royal burgh	Perth and Kinross

=== Small burgh: County of Kinross ===
Burgh	Notes	1975 district
Kinross		Perth and Kinross

=== Small burghs: County of Perth ===
Burgh	Notes	1975 district
Aberfeldy		Perth and Kinross
Abernethy		Perth and Kinross
Alyth		Perth and Kinross
Auchterarder	Royal burgh (from 1951)	Perth and Kinross
Blairgowrie and Rattray	Union of two burghs	Perth and Kinross
Callander		Stirling
Coupar Angus		Perth and Kinross
Crieff		Perth and Kinross
Doune		Stirling
Dunblane		Stirling
Pitlochry		Perth and Kinross

=== Landward districts: County of Kinross ===
The County of Kinross was not divided into districts: the Kinross County Council performed district-level local government functions.

=== Landward districts: County of Perth ===
District	Notes	1975 district
Central	Comrie; Muthill; Monzievaird and Crieff; Fowlis Wester; Blackford; Glendevon; Trinity Gask; Dunning; and Logiealmond areas	Perth and Kinross
Eastern	Cargill; Coupar Angus and Bendochy; Alyth and Meigle; Glenericht; Capath; Kirkmichael; and St Martins areas	Perth and Kinross, Clackmannan (Muckhart)
Highland	Dunkeld; Little Dunkeld; Logerait; Moulin; Pitlochry; Kenmore; Dull and Weem; Fortingall; Rannoch; and Blair Atholl areas	Perth and Kinross
Perth	Aberbargie; Bridge of Earn; Forteviot; Tibbermore; Scone; Kinnoull; St Madoes; Methven, Stanley; Auchtergaven; Redgorton; Errol; Inchture; and Longforgan areas	Perth and Kinross, City of Dundee (Longforgan)
Western	Killin; Callander and Balquhidder; Aberfoyle and Menteith; Kincardine; Kilmadock and Deanston; Dunblane and Lecropt; and Ardoch areas	Perth and Kinross (Ardoch), Stirling

== County of Renfrew ==
=== Large burghs ===
Burgh	Notes	1975 district
Greenock		Inverclyde
Paisley		Renfrew
Port Glasgow		Inverclyde

=== Small burghs ===
Burgh	Notes	1975 district
Barrhead		Renfrew
Gourock		Inverclyde
Johnstone		Renfrew
Renfrew	Royal burgh	Renfrew

=== Landward districts ===
District	Notes	1975 district
First	Busby, Cathcart, Eaglesham, Eastwood & Thornliebank, Giffnock and Mearns areas	Eastwood (identical in area)
Second	Elderslie, Hurlet & Oldhall, Neilston, Ouplaymuir and Paisley areas	Renfrew
Third	Bishopton, Erskine, Houston (East), Inchinnan and Renfrew areas	Renfrew
Fourth	Bridge of Weir, Kilbarchan, Houston (West), Linwood and Lochwinnoch areas	Renfrew
Fifth	Kilmacolm, Inverkip and landward parts of the parishes of Port Glasgow and Paisley	Inverclyde

== County of Ross and Cromarty ==
=== Small burghs ===
Burgh	Notes	1975 district
Cromarty		Ross and Cromarty
Dingwall	Royal burgh	Ross and Cromarty
Fortrose	Royal burgh	Ross and Cromarty
Invergordon		Ross and Cromarty
Stornoway		Western Isles Islands Area
Tain	Royal burgh	Ross and Cromarty

=== Landward districts ===
District	Notes	1975 district
Avoch	Avoch; Knockbain; and Killearnan areas	Ross and Cromarty
Dingwall	Alness and Kiltearn; Dingwall (Maryburgh); and Fodderty (Strathpeffer) areas	Ross and Cromarty
Fearn	Tarbat; Fearn; and Nigg areas	Ross and Cromarty
Fortrose	Cromarty; Rosemarkie; and Resolis areas	Ross and Cromarty
Gairloch	Gairloch; and Gairloch (Poolewe) areas	Ross and Cromarty
Invergordon	Logie Easter and Kilmuir Easter; Rosskeen East; and Rosskeen West areas	Ross and Cromarty
Lewis	Barvas (North); Barvas (South); Lochs; Lochs (Park); Stornoway (Back); Stornoway (Central); Stornoway (Point); Uig (East) and Uig (West) areas	Western Isles Islands Area
Loch Broom	Dundonnell; Lochbroom (Coigach); and Lochbroom (Ullapool) areas	Ross and Cromarty
Lochcarron	Applecross; and Lochcarron areas	Ross and Cromarty
Muir of Ord	Contin (Contin); Contin (Kinlochluichart); Urquhart; Urray; and Urray (Muir of Ord) areas	Ross and Cromarty
South West	Glenshiel and Kintail; and Lochalsh areas	Skye and Lochalsh
Tain	Kincardine; and Edderton and Tain areas	Ross and Cromarty (Edderton and Tain), Sutherland (Kincardine)

== County of Roxburgh ==
=== Small burghs ===
Burgh	Notes	1975 district
Hawick		Roxburgh
Jedburgh	Royal burgh	Roxburgh
Kelso		Roxburgh
Melrose		Ettrick and Lauderdale

=== Landward districts ===
District	Notes	1975 district
Hawick	Castleton, Cavers (North), Hawick (North), Newcastleton, Roberton & Hawick (South) and Teviothead & Cavers (south) areas	Roxburgh
Jedburgh	Ancrum, Bedrule & Minto, Crailing, Hobkirk, Jedburgh (Landward), Oxnam and Southdean areas	Roxburgh
Kelso	Eckford, Ednam & Stichill, Kelso (Landward) & Heiton, Linton, Makerstoun & Smailholm, Morebattle & Hownam, Sprouston and Yetholm areas	Roxburgh
Melrose	Bowden, Lilliesleaf, Melrose, Roxburgh & Maxton and St Boswells areas	Most to Ettrick and Lauderdale; part (Roxburgh parish) to Roxburgh

== County of Selkirk ==
=== Small burghs ===
Burgh	Notes	1975 district
Galashiels		Ettrick and Lauderdale
Selkirk	Royal burgh	Ettrick and Lauderdale

=== Landward districts ===
District	Notes	1975 district
North	Caddonfoot, Galashiels, Selkirk & Lindean, and Bowhill & Philiphaugh areas	Ettrick and Lauderdale
South	Yarrow and St. Mary's, Ettrick and Kirkhope West, and Kirkhope East & Ashkirk areas	Ettrick and Lauderdale

== County of Stirling ==
=== Large burghs ===
Burgh	Notes	1975 district
Falkirk		Falkirk
Stirling	Royal burgh	Stirling

=== Small burghs ===
Burgh	Notes	1975 district
Bridge of Allan		Stirling
Denny and Dunipace		Falkirk
Grangemouth		Falkirk
Kilsyth		Cumbernauld and Kilsyth

=== Landward districts ===
District	Notes	1975 district
Central No.1	Bannockburn, Cambusbarron, Cowie, Logie, Plean, Polmaise and Sauchie areas	Stirling
Central No.2	Bonnybridge, Denny, Dunnipace, Falkirk West and Kilsyth areas	Most to Falkirk; part (Kilsyth area) to Cumbernauld and Kilsyth
Eastern No.1	Airth, Bothkennar, Carron, Larbert and Stenhousemuir areas	Falkirk
Eastern No.2	Falkirk Central and East, Plomont, Redding and Shieldhill areas	Falkirk
Eastern No.3	Muiravonside and Slamannan areas	Falkirk
Western No.1	Buchanan and Drymen areas	Stirling
Western No.2	Balfron, Fintry & Killearn, Gargunnock, Kippen and Strathblane areas	Stirling
Western No.3	Baldernock, Lennoxtown, Milton and Torrance areas	Strathkelvin

== County of Sutherland ==
=== Small burgh ===
Burgh	Notes	1975 district
Dornoch	Royal burgh	Sutherland

=== Landward districts ===
District	Notes	1975 district
Assynt	Assynt and Stoer areas	Sutherland
Dornoch and Creich	Creich and Dornoch areas	Sutherland
Eddrachillis and Durness	Durness and Edrachillis areas	Sutherland
Golspie, Rogart and Lairg	Golspie, Lairg and Rogart areas	Sutherland
Kildonan, Loth and Clyne	Clyne, Kildonan and Loth areas	Sutherland
Tongue and Farr	Farr, Strathy and Tongue areas	Sutherland

== County of West Lothian ==
=== Small burghs ===
Burgh	Notes	1975 district
Armadale		West Lothian
Bathgate		West Lothian
Bo'ness		Falkirk
Linlithgow	Royal burgh	West Lothian
Queensferry	Royal burgh	City of Edinburgh
Whitburn		West Lothian

=== Landward districts ===
District	Notes	1975 district
Bo'ness	Bo'ness and Carriden areas	Falkirk
Linlithgow	Linlithgow area	West Lothian
Queensferry renamed Kirkliston and Winchburgh	Abercorn, Dalmeny, Kirkliston and Winchburgh areas	Split between West Lothian (Abercorn and Winchburgh) and City of Edinburgh (remainder)
Torphichen and Bathgate	Bathgate, Blackridge, Torphichen and Woodend areas	West Lothian
Uphall	Broxburn, Ecclesmachan and Uphall areas	West Lothian
Whitburn and Livingston	Blackburn, Fauldhouse, Livingston, Seafield, Stoneybum and Whitburn areas	West Lothian

== County of Wigtown ==
=== Small burghs ===
Burgh	Notes	1975 district
Newton Stewart		Wigtown
Stranraer	Royal burgh	Wigtown
Wigtown	Royal burgh	Wigtown
Whithorn	Royal burgh	Wigtown

=== Landward districts ===
District	Notes	1975 district
Machars	Glasserton, Kirkcowan, Kirkinner, Mochrum, Penninghame, Sorbie, Whithorn and Wigtown areas	Wigtown
Rhins	Inch, Kirkcolm, Kirkmaiden, Leswalt, New Luce, Old Luce, Portpatrick and Stoneykirk areas	Wigtown

== County of Zetland ==
=== Small burgh ===
Burgh	Notes	1975 district
Lerwick		Shetland Islands Area

=== Landward districts ===
District	Notes	1975 district
Bressay	Bressay area	Shetland Islands Area
Delting	Delting North; and Delting South areas	Shetland Islands Area
Dunrossness	Cunningsburgh; Dunrossness North; Dunrossness South; and Sandwick areas	Shetland Islands Area
Fetlar	Fetlar area	Shetland Islands Area
Lerwick	Burra and Quarff; and Gulberwick areas	Dissolved to form Gulberwick & Quarff, Isle of Burra Districts
Nesting renamed Nesting and Lunnasting	Nesting and Lunnasting area	Shetland Islands Area
Northmavine	Northmavine North; and Northmavine South areas	Shetland Islands Area
Sandsting renamed Sandsting and Aithsting	Aithsting; and Sandsting areas	Shetland Islands Area
Tingwall	Tingwall; and Whiteness and Weisdale areas	Shetland Islands Area
Unst	Unst North; and Unst South areas	Shetland Islands Area
Walls renamed Walls and Sandness	Sandness; and Walls areas	Shetland Islands Area
Whalsay renamed Whalsay and Skerries	Whalsay and Skerries area	Shetland Islands Area
Yell	Yell North; and Yell South areas	Shetland Islands Area

== See also ==
- Subdivisions of Scotland
