= Cessford, Scottish Borders =

Village in Scottish Borders, Scotland, UK

Coordinates: 55.50498°N 2.42107°W

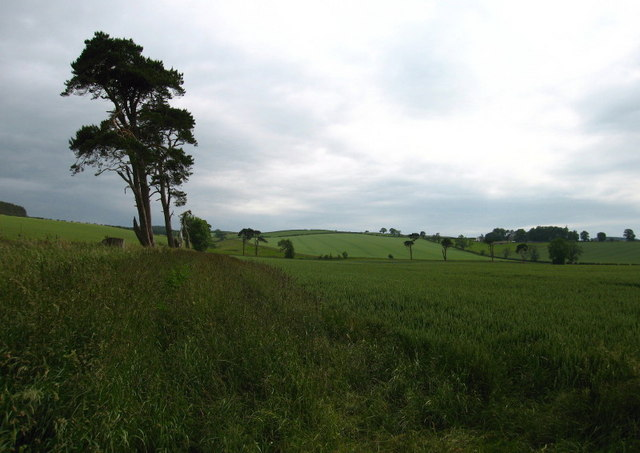
Cheviot countryside near Cessford

Cessford is a hamlet and former barony about a mile south of the B6401 road, in the Scottish Borders area of Scotland. The placename is from Gaelic 'ceis' and means 'the wattled causeway over the ford'; spellings vary between Cesfuird, Cesford, Cessfoord, Cessfuird, and Cessfurde.

Places nearby include Crailing, Eckford, Kelso, Morebattle, Nisbet, and Oxnam

Cessford Castle is a ruined castle nearby.

Cessford Burn is a tributary of the Kale Water.

== See also ==
- List of places in the Scottish Borders
