= 1977 Skye and Lochalsh District Council election =

1977 Scottish local government election

← 1974	7 May 1977	1980 →

All 10 seats to Skye and Lochalsh District Council 6 seats needed for a majority
	First party
Party	Independent
Last election	10
Seats before	10
Seats won	10
Seat change	0
Popular vote	1,487
Percentage	100.0%
Swing	0.0%
Council Convener before election
Torquil Nicolson
Independent
Council Convener after election
Torquil Nicolson
Independent

Elections to the Skye and Lochalsh District Council took place in May 1977, alongside elections to the councils of Scotland's other districts.

Council Convener Torquil Nicolson died suddenly in 1978, triggering a by-election in Kyle-Plockton.

== Aggregate results ==
Skye and Lochalsh District Election Result 1977
Party	Seats	Gains	Losses	Net gain/loss	Seats %	Votes %	Votes	+/−
Independent	10	0	0	0	100.0	100.0	1,487	0.0

== By-elections ==
1978 Kyle-Plockton by-election
Party	Candidate	Votes	%
Independent	Alistair Langlands	264	42.8%
Independent	Geoffrey Webster	239	38.7%
Independent	Godfrey Hathway	114	18.5%
Majority		25	4.1%
Independent hold			
