= Roxburgh (village) =

Village in Scottish Borders, Scotland, UK

Coordinates: 55.569°N 2.477°W

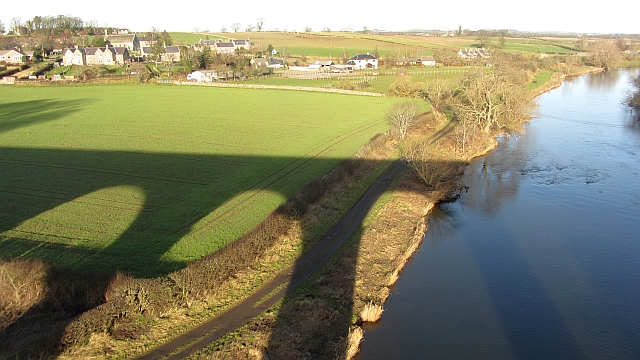
Roxburgh seen from the old railway viaduct

Roxburgh (Gaelic, Rosbrog) is a village off the A699, by the River Teviot, near Kelso in the Scottish Borders area of Scotland.

It should not be confused with the historic royal burgh of Roxburgh, the site of which lies about 2 miles (3.2 km) northeast of the present village.

Other places nearby include Ednam, Heiton, Maxton, Morebattle, Smailholm, Sprouston and Stichill.

The Borders Abbeys Way passes through the village.

== See also ==
- List of places in the Scottish Borders
- List of places in Scotland
