= 1992 Skye and Lochalsh District Council election =

1992 Scottish local government election

← 1988	7 May 1992	1995 →

All 11 seats to Skye and Lochalsh District Council 6 seats needed for a majority

	First party	Second party
Party	Independent	SNP
Seats won	10	1
Seat change	▲1	▲1
Popular vote	2,129	391
Percentage	82.0%	15.1%
Swing	▼18.0%	New
Council Convener before election
John Farquhar Munro
Independent
Council Convener after election
John Farquhar Munro
Independent

Elections to the Skye and Lochalsh District Council took place in May 1992, alongside elections to the councils of Scotland's various other districts.

The result of the election

== Aggregate results ==
Skye and Lochalsh District Election Result 1992
Party	Seats	Gains	Losses	Net gain/loss	Seats %	Votes %	Votes	+/−
Independent	10	1	0	▲1	90.0	82.0	2,129	▼18.0
SNP	1	1	0	▲1	10.0	15.1	391	New
Independent nationalist	0	0	0	0	0.0	3.1	78	New
