= Robert Davidson (poet) =

Scottish poet and labourer

Robert Davidson (1778- 6 April 1855) was a Scottish poet and labourer, whose writings give a rare glimpse into the life of the rural labouring poor at the beginning of the 19th century.

He was born at Lempitlaw in the historic County of Roxburgh (the modern Scottish Borders), later moving to the village of Morebattle. Despite the harsh existence of agricultural labour and having to support a family, Davidson managed to publish three collections of poems during his lifetime. His third collection, Leaves from a Peasant's Cottage Drawer, was published in Edinburgh in 1848 by James Hogg, the son of the 'Ettrick Shepherd' author.

In June 2008 a memorial plaque was unveiled in Morebattle churchyard where Davidson is buried, and Leaves from a Peasant's Cottage Drawer was republished, 160 years after its first edition.
