= Battle of Haddon Rig =

1542 battle of the Anglo-Scottish Wars

- Part of the Anglo-Scottish Wars
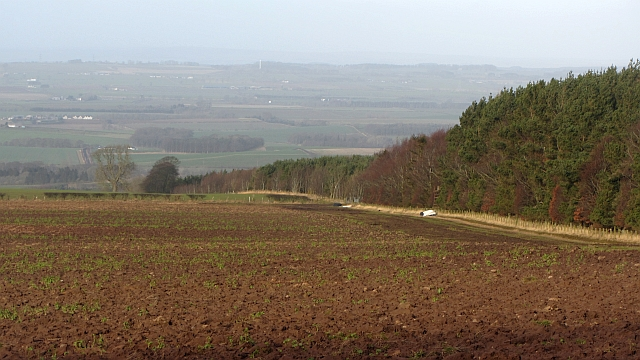
- Haddon Rig today
Date	24 August 1542
Location	Teviotdale 55°36′N 2°21′W
Result	Scottish victory

Belligerents
Scotland	England

Commanders and leaders
Earl of Huntly	Sir Robert Bowes

Strength
2,000	Over 3,000

Casualties and losses
Light	Over 2,000 killed 600 captured
- Location within Scotland

The Battle of Haddon Rig was fought about three miles east of Kelso, in the Scottish Borders, between Scotland and England on 24 August 1542, during the reigns of King James V of Scotland and Henry VIII of England. The Scottish army was led by the George Gordon, 4th Earl of Huntly and the English army was led by Robert Bowes, Deputy Warden of the English East March. It was a significant Scottish victory, but it was overshadowed by the disastrous Scottish defeat at the Battle of Solway Moss in November.

== Location ==
Haddon Rig is a large glacial ridge (rig) occupying gently sloping land between Sprouston and the River Tweed in the north, and Lempitlaw and the Cheviot Hills in the south. It is relatively flat on its summit which lies at around 160 m above sea level. The town of Kelso and settlement of Heiton lie 5 km to the west, and 7.5 km to the south-west respectively.

William Roy depicted "a small medieval settlement at Hadden surrounded by agricultural land but there is no reference to Haddon Rig. However, it is named in Crawford and Brooke's 1843 county map of Roxburghshire. The First Edition Ordnance Survey (1859) map depicts a woodland plantation Haddonrig Wood, within an area of land called Haddon Rig. To the west of Haddon rig wood is a small circular area of woodland named Jockscairn plantation, the naming of which may have some association with the battle, or its commemoration. Immediately to the south of Haddon Rig is the old Kelso to Wooler Road (currently the B6396), which also appears on Roy's map and, which may have been used by raiding forces."

== Haddon Rig ==
Henry of England, being disgusted at his nephew King James's connections with France, and finding that James's ally, King Francis, had sufficient employment at home, resolved to invade Scotland, both by sea and land. He, "appointed a very considerable army to rendezvous upon the borders, under the command of Robert Bowes, one of the Border wardens, the Earl of Angus, George Douglas and James Douglas of Parkhead. In August 1542, James nominated the Earl of Huntly to be his lieutenant commanding his army on the borders, consisting of 10,000 men based at Kelso. According to Robert Lindsay of Pitscottie, Huntly was supported by Walter Lindsay of Torphichen, who had seen a great deal of foreign service.

Huntly acquitted himself admirably well in his commission, and was so well served by his spies, as to have certain intelligence that the English intended to surprise and burn Jedburgh and Kelso.

Huntly being informed that the English had advanced, on the 24th of August, to a place called Haddonrig, and that they had destroyed a great part of the Scottish and Debatable Lands, resolved to engage them; and the English were astonished when they saw the Scottish drawn up in order of battle about day-break. Neither party could now retreat without fighting; and Torphichen, who led the van, consisting of 2000 of the best troops of Scotland, charged the enemy so furiously, that Huntly gained a complete and easy victory. Above 2,000 of the English were killed, and 600 taken prisoner among whom were Robert Bowes, William Mowbray, and about sixty northern barons; the Earl of Angus escaped by the swiftness of his horse. The loss of the Scottish was so inconsiderable that it is not mentioned.

== Aftermath ==
News of the battle was sent to the Privy Council of England by William Eure and by George Douglas and the Earl of Angus. They described how the English forces had divided into two raiding parties, and then met again at Heiton on the Hill. They were driving sheep and cows when they were surprised by the Scottish force. The Scots captured Cuthbert Ratcliff, John Heron of Chipchase, John Carr the Captain of Wark, and John Widdrington the Marshall of Berwick. George Douglas and the Earl of Angus blamed English "misorder" for the defeat, writing:

Trewely, it wos nocht tha that wan the feyld, it was we that losd it with our mysordour
(Truly, it was not they that won the field, it was we that lost it with our misorder)

John Carr was allowed to return to Wark at the end of August. There had been 100 soldiers stationed at the castle but only 50 had returned, injured and without weapons.

== Norfolk's raid ==
There were negotiations in York in September and October to discuss the release of the prisoners, a potential peace treaty and a meeting of the two kings. James Learmonth of Dairsie, a Master Household to King James, went to London to seek an audience with Henry VIII at Greenwich Palace but was only admitted to meet the Privy Council. Some versions of Pitscottie's chronicle mention that Learmonth brought a letter from James V with secret writing, "sealed and closed so straitly as could be devised for opening of the same" and invited Henry VIII to reply in kind. One sticking point in the negotiations was that the Scottish captors had not offered ransoms. Henry VIII required his forces make some "noble exploit" after the dishonour of the defeat at Hadden Rig.

The Duke of Norfolk was instructed to invade and spent a week (22–26 October 1542) burning villages and towers around Kelso and Roxburghe. Norfolk reported difficulties provisioning his army. Four Scottish men caught spying on the army at Eccles were hanged. The burnt places included Paxton, Floors, Stichill, Ednam, Smailholm Spittle, and Kelso Abbey.

James V seems to have mustered two forces to counter the Duke of Norfolk near Lauder and Smailholm but failed to engage. The campaign was sometimes called the "Raid of Fala" after the location of the Scottish muster. John Carr wrote that James V was at Lauder at the end of October and the lords did not want to invade England. Norfolk heard there was little food for the Scottish army, and the Scottish soldiers took sheep from the locality. Pitscottie's chronicle and the Diurnal of Occurrents claim that Norfolk's incursion had made little damage or "skaith" and the Scottish lords were reluctant to pursue his army into England.

English ships attacked Coldingham and Aberdour. James V wrote to the Pope Paul III on 9 November 1542 framing English aggression as an assault on Christendom. He claimed the English losses at Haddon Rig were 10,000. David Beaton wrote a similar letter.

== Somerset Herald ==
The English prisoners Robert Bowes and Roger Lascelles were held at St Andrews Castle, Richard Bowes and Thomas Slingsby at Spynie Palace, and John Widdrington at Roslin Castle. The English Somerset Herald, Thomas Trahern, was murdered near Innerwick Castle while carrying messages about their release. An English chronicle relates that grief and shame at the herald's murder contributed to the death of James V at Falkland Palace on 14 December 1542.

== Battle of Solway Moss ==
English raids into Scotland continued. A Scottish army was defeated at the battle of Solway Moss near Longtown and Sandysike in Arthuret on 24 November 1542. The English commander Thomas Wharton described the "overthrow of Scots" between the two rivers, Esk and Leven.

== Legacy ==
The Haddon Rig sheep farm in New South Wales Australia is named for the Scottish battle site.

The Battle of Haddon Rig is commemorated in a composition for solo bagpipes composed by Clan Piper to Clan Davidson, Lindsay Davidson.
