= Kalemouth Suspension Bridge =

Bridge in the Scottish Borders, Scotland

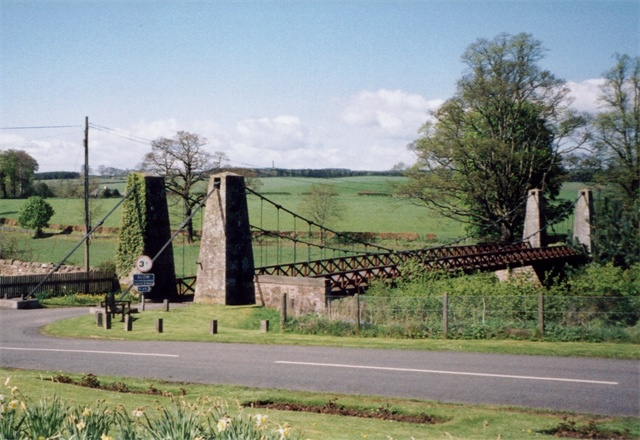
- Coordinates: 55°32′24″N 2°27′49″W
- Crosses: River Teviot

Characteristics
- Material: Wrought iron
- Width: 16 feet (4.9 m)
- Longest span: 180 feet (55 m)

History
- Designer: Captain Samuel Brown

Listed Building – Category A
- Official name: Kalemouth Suspension Bridge, Over River Teviot
- Designated: 18 August 1977
- Reference no.: LB3849

Location
- Interactive map of Kalemouth Suspension Bridge

The Kalemouth Suspension Bridge is a suspension bridge at Kalemouth in the Scottish Borders area of Scotland, near the B6401. It crosses the River Teviot just above its confluence with the Kale Water, near Eckford.

== History ==
It was designed by Captain Samuel Brown (1776-1852), an officer of the Royal Navy, and built by William Mather, a contractor of Kalemouth, some time between 1820 and 1830. Alexander Jeffrey wrote in 1838 "there is a chain bridge erected over the Tweed (sic) by the Late Mr Ormiston of that Ilk, at his own expense, for his private use: but it has since been opened to the public for a trifling fee - a boon which cannot easily be forgot or misused." In 1834, the tolls were ½d. for a foot passenger, 3d. for a horse or cart, 6d. for a gig, and 1s. for a chaise. Tolls are thought to have been paid at Kalemouth Cottage, now enlarged and a private home. Another source give the name of the person who paid for the bridge as William Mein of Ormiston.

It is protected as a Category A listed building. and is one of the earliest surviving carriage suspension bridges.

The bridge was closed to motor vehicles in August 2020 due to significant defects in its timber deck, with restoration of its use as a vehicle crossing considered unlikely. In March 2026, Scottish Borders Council was awarded £250,000 from the National Lottery Heritage Fund to refurbish the bridge and allow its continued use by pedestrians and cyclist, along with new interpretation panels.

== Design ==
It crosses the River Teviot just above its confluence with the Kale Water, near Eckford. There is another nearby bridge called the Kalemouth Bridge, which carries the A698 over the Kale Water.

The bridge works on the principle of suspension, and uses chains with long iron links for the suspension cables. Iron rods are used for suspenders to connect the chain to the deck of the bridge, and additional suspenders have been added in the middle of the chain links. A red painted wooden truss supports the wooden deck, which is covered with a layer of asphalt. The four ashlar pylons at the ends of the bridge are of pyramidal form.

The bridge has a span of 180 feet (55 m), and is 16 feet (4.9 m) wide.

== See also ==
- List of bridges in Scotland
