= Hadden, Roxburghshire =

Village in Scottish Borders, Scotland

Coordinates: 55°37′07″N 2°20′17″W

Hadden is a hamlet in Scotland near Kelso, and is now part of the Scottish Borders district. "Hadden is an inhabited place in the parish of Sprouston."

== History ==
The name "Hadden" has several variants. A common variant is that the name is a corruption of "Half-Dane", referring to the children born nine months after Viking raids.

"Hadden, an ancient village, now reduced to a single farmhouse, in Sprouston parish, NE Roxburghshire, 7 furlongs E of the English Border, 5 furlongs SSW of Carham station, and 5 miles ENE of Kelso. In olden days it was a frequent meeting-place of Scottish and English commissioners, to adjust boundaries and to settle disputes. Hadden Rig, a ridge of elevated land that runs through the middle of the parish, and culminates at an altitude of 541 feet, was the scene in 1540 of the defeat of 3000 mounted English troops by a Scotch force." Ordnance Survey, sh. 26, 1864.

"Hadden has references dating back to the early thirteenth century. It is situated one mile west of the ‘Border Line’ which was fixed in 1222 and, at that time, Hadden is referred to as being ‘a place of considerable importance’. Hadden was also a meeting place for the Lord Warden of the Marches, with one meeting of particular importance having been held in 1397 to redress cross border violations. Over the centuries there have been numerous battles over the Border marches. On 24 August 1542, following ruptures between James V and Henry VIII, the Scots are reported to have defeated an English force during a hard contest at the battle of Hadden Rig. The Scots, under Earl of Moray, defeated the English led by Sir Robert Bowes (lawyer), and took him and 600 of his men prisoner. Nearby is Haddon Rig, where the Battle of Haddon Rig, also known as the "Battle of Hadden-Rig", was fought."

Also nearby named places are "Hadden Woods" and "Hadden Farm". This farm is by a minor road between Kerchesters and Nottylees. "Hadden Farm" is listed in the Acts of Alexander III of Scotland, in 1278, where he gave to Eymer de Hadden 22 marks (merkes) for land in Roxburghshire. This was later presented to Parliament in 1305 where Hadden showed that the king had paid him the funds annually.

"Plan of disputed ground on the Border of Scotland and England." 1605. This record has been digitally imaged and will not be produced for readers. The digital images may be seen in the NRS Search Rooms on the 'Virtual Volumes' system or on the Scotlands People website http://www.scotlandspeople.gov.uk. 'The description of Holden Rigge [Hadden Rig].' Unattributed. Scale not given. 306 x 401mm. Ink and colour wash. Linen backing. Plan of disputed ground on the Border of Scotland and England, including Nottylees (Knottieleese), The Midrig and Howburn Ford, with two possible marches marked. Land owners named. Decorative border. Title within ornate cartouche.

== Bibliography ==
- Patrick Hanks. Howden. Oxford University Press, 2003. Summary: "Scottish: habitational name from a place so called near Kelso on the border with England. Early forms include Hadden."
- Tait, Alexander, and Charles Murray. Information for Alexander Tait, Merchant in Edinburgh against Charles Murray of Hadden. [Edinburgh]: [publisher not identified], 1695.
- Murray, Charles. Unto the Right Honourable the Lords of His Majesties Thesaury and Exchequer. The Petition of Charles Murray of Hadden. [Edinburgh]: [publisher not identified], 1691.
