= 1980 Skye and Lochalsh District Council election =

1980 Scottish local government election

← 1977	1 May 1980	1984 →

All 11 seats to Skye and Lochalsh District Council 6 seats needed for a majority
	First party
Party	Independent
Seats won	9
Seat change	▼1
Popular vote	366
Percentage	100.0%
Swing	0.0
Council Control before election
Independent
Council Control after election
Independent

Elections to the Skye and Lochalsh District Council took place in May 1980, alongside elections to the councils of Scotland's other districts.

Only one seat was contested while two were left vacant after the election.

== Aggregate results ==
Skye and Lochalsh District Election Result 1980
Party	Seats	Gains	Losses	Net gain/loss	Seats %	Votes %	Votes	+/−
Independent	9	0	1	▼1		100.0	366	0.0
Uncontested election	2							
