= 1974 Skye and Lochalsh District Council election =

Skye and Lochalsh District Council election

7 May 1974	1977 →

All 10 seats to Skye and Lochalsh District Council 6 seats needed for a majority
	First party
Party	Independent
Seats won	10
Popular vote	3,567
Percentage	100.0%
Council Convener after election
Torquil Nicolson
Independent

Elections to Skye and Lochalsh District Council were held on 7 May 1974, on the same day as the other Scottish local government elections. This was the first election to the district council following the implementation of the Local Government (Scotland) Act 1973.

The election used the 10 wards created by the Formation Electoral Arrangements in 1974. Each ward elected one councillor using first-past-the-post voting.

Skye and Lochalsh was a non-partisan district. No political party contested the election and all of the 10 seats were won by independents.

== Background ==
Prior to 1974, the area that was to become Skye and Lochalsh was split between two counties – the County of Inverness and the County of Ross and Cromarty. Although there were three burghs in the County of Inverness and six in the County of Ross and Cromarty, none were located in the area that would become Skye and Lochalsh. Burghs had some controls over local government depending on their size with the rest of the local government responsibility falling to the county council.

Following the recommendations in the Wheatly Report, the old system of counties and burghs – which had resulted in a mishmash of local government areas in which some small burghs had larger populations but far fewer responsibilities than some large burghs and even counties – was to be replaced by a new system of regional and district councils. The Local Government (Scotland) Act 1973 implemented most of the recommendations in the Wheatly Report. The southwestern part of the County of Ross and Cromarty was combined with the Isle of Skye and surrounding islands from the County of Inverness and was placed into the Skye and Lochalsh district within the Highland region.

== Results ==
1974 Skye and Lochalsh District Council election result
Party	Seats	Gains	Losses	Net gain/loss	Seats %	Votes %	Votes	+/−
Independent	10			N/A	100.0	100.0	3,567	N/A

== Aftermath ==
Skye and Lochalsh, like the other seven districts in Highland, was non-partisan and controlled by independent candidates who won all 10 seats. Independents also controlled the regional council which held its first election on the same day. Across Scotland, Labour won the most votes, the most seats and the most councils of any party.
