= Pennymuir Roman camps =

Pennymuir
- Scottish Borders, Scotland, UK
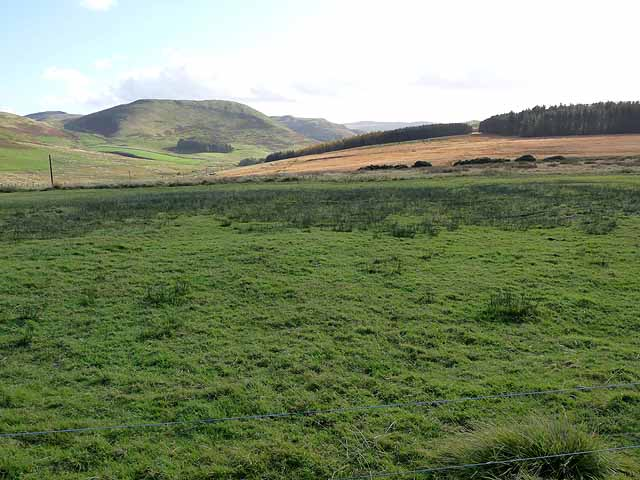
- View across Camp A at the Pennymuir Roman camps

Location
- Location in the Scottish Borders
- Coordinates: 55.4181°N 2.3882°W
- Grid reference: NT7514

The Pennymuir Roman camps are situated southeast of Jedburgh in the Scottish Borders area of Scotland, near the Anglo-Scottish border, in the former Roxburghshire. The site, alongside the course of the Roman road known as Dere Street, consists of the remains of four Roman temporary camps, a linear earthwork and an area of rig. The site is also sometimes referred to as the Towford camps.

== Overview ==
The camps at Pennymuir lie on rough moorland in the Cheviot Hills beside Dere Street, a short distance north of Tow Ford where the Roman road crossed the Kale Water. Camps A and B are considered amongst the best preserved Roman camps in Scotland. These two were first recorded in 1774 by William Roy.

The Pennymuir camps lie about 7 kilometres northwest of the Roman camps and fortlets at Chew Green on the English side of the Anglo-Scottish border and are located in the vicinity of Woden Law hillfort.

== Camp A ==
Camp A (grid reference NT754139) is the largest camp in the group. It lies close to the west side of Dere Street on a platform of moderately even ground. Its south end lies on the edge of a small, dry gully. It is approximately rectangular in shape, and measures 520 metres from north to south by 343 metres east to west and encloses almost 18 hectares. Entrance gaps are visible on all four sides, with two visible on the west side. The ramparts of the camp measure up to 4.6 metres wide and 1.2 metres high, with the ditch some 4.6 metres wide and up to 1.2 metres deep in places.

== Camp B ==
Camp B (grid reference NT756138) lies within the southeast portion of camp A, and utilises part of the east and south defences of camp A. It is the later of the two camps. It has a rectangular shape, and measures 300 metres from north to south by 130 metres east to west and encloses almost 4 hectares. Entrance gaps are visible on the west (two), north and east sides. The northward gate on the west side had been narrowed at a later date, which may be the result of a later re-occupation of the camp.

== Camp C ==
Camp C (grid reference NT756144) is situated to the north-east of camps A and B on the east side of Dere Street and astride the modern road from Pennymuir to Hownam. It has been partially obliterated by drainage and a plantation. The camp is a parallelogram in shape, and measures 280 metres from northwest to southeast by 185 metres, and encloses 5.1 hectares. The only visible part is the west side, south of the Pennymuir road, where it is traceable for 50 metres as a slight turf bank, some 2 metres wide and 20 centimetres high.

== Camp D ==
A probable fourth camp (grid reference NT757139) has been found on air photographs on the east side of Dere Street opposite camp A. Only part of the camp has been traced, measuring 192 metres from north to south by at least 120 metres, suggesting that it enclosed at least 2.3 hectares. The north and east sides (including the northeast corner) are traceable as a low spread turf bank 5 metres wide and 20 centimetres high. The south and west sides have been obliterated by former cultivation and by recent drainage ditches.

== Later features ==
The remains of a later farmstead are situated immediately to the east of the road between the camps, and comprises at least two buildings and five enclosures. Traces of rig and furrow cultivation lie within the enclosures.

There is also a linear earthwork which can be seen within camp A running north from about 20 metres northeast of the southwest corner of the camp. It probably functioned as a later boundary.

== See also ==
- List of places in the Scottish Borders
- List of places in Northumberland
