= Cessford Burn =

Stream in Scottish Borders, Scotland

Coordinates: 55.52017°N 2.40446°W

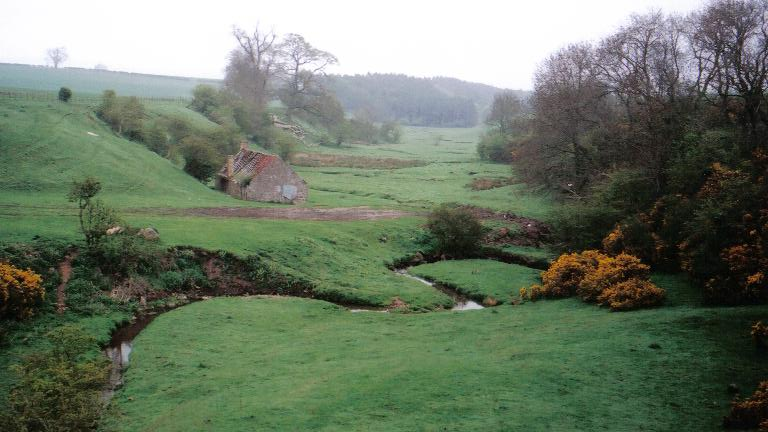
The Cessford Burn North West Aspect

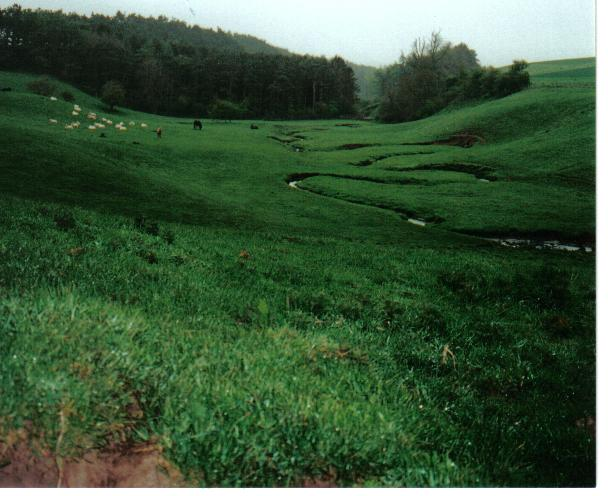
The Cessford Burn looking North

Cessford Burn is a small stream which eventually runs to meet the Kale Water and then joins the River Teviot, finally entering the River Tweed at Kelso, Scotland.

A site at Cessford Burn has the remains of an ancient farmstead attached to Cessford Castle in the historic county of Roxburghshire (now an administrative area of Scottish Borders Region), between Kelso and Morebattle, in the parish of Eckford. The extant foundation stones of the dwellings, which can be seen to this day, are situated on the north bank of the Cessford Burn. Seven shiels, or thatched cottages, once housed the families of the farm steward, the shepherd and the ploughman. The farmstead was burned to the ground by the English many times, including the border campaign of the Earl of Surrey in May, 1523 and again by the Earl of Hertford in 1545, and during the Rough Wooing of Mary, Queen of Scots, by Henry VIII of England.

The families living in these shiels were in the service of the Kers of Cessford, latterly the Dukes of Roxburghe, who were granted by Royal Charters of both James I of Scotland and James II of Scotland, to hold these lands of the Crown. This encompassed Cessford (or Kerr) Castle, the dwellings at Cessford Burn, and the castleton of Cessford, lying just outside the north gate to the castle. Cessford Castle, in ruins today, stands upon the ridge opposite Cessford Burn on the south bank. The castleton is no longer extant, but aerial photographs and Matthew Stobie's 1770 map of Roxburghshire show that the village lay hard by the castle to the northwest on the Morebattle road; about 140 souls lived in Cessford village during those times.

Along the quiet, green banks of Cessford Burn is Habbie Kerr's cave, where local citizens had sought safety and shelter since the fifth century CE. Just south of Cessford Castle, there once stood an ancient ash tree known as the "Crow Tree", where summary Jeddart Justice was carried out.

A branch of the old Border family Nisbet were shepherds in Cessford Burn from about 1665 until they emigrated to Canada and New York in 1822, due to the farm consolidations of the late 18th century on the Scottish Borders. Also see Nisbet, Roxburghshire.

== See also ==
- List of places in the Scottish Borders
- List of places in East Lothian
- List of places in Edinburgh
- List of places in Midlothian
- List of places in West Lothian
- List of places in Scotland

== Sources ==
Alexander Jeffrey - The History & Antiquities of Roxburghshire & Adjacent Districts (4 vols, Edinburgh: Seton & Mackenzie, 1855–64).
