= 1984 Skye and Lochalsh District Council election =

1984 Scottish local government election

← 1980	3 May 1984	1988 →

All 11 seats to Skye and Lochalsh District Council 6 seats needed for a majority

	First party	Second party
Party	Independent	Alliance
Seats won	10	1
Seat change	▲1	▲1
Popular vote	1,120	0
Percentage	100.0%	0.0%
Swing	0.0%	0.0%
Council Control before election
Independent
Council Convener after election
John Farquhar Munro
Independent

Elections to the Skye and Lochalsh District Council took place in May 1984, alongside elections to the councils of Scotland's other districts.

Only three seats were contested. One SDP-Liberal Alliance councillor was elected unopposed for the seat of Glenshiel/Glenelg, the first time any party won representation on the council.

== Aggregate results ==
Skye and Lochalsh District Election Result 1984
Party	Seats	Gains	Losses	Net gain/loss	Seats %	Votes %	Votes	+/−
Independent	10	▲1	0	▲1	90.0	100.0	1,120	0.0
Alliance	1	▲1	0	▲1	10.0	0.0	0	New
