= List of listed buildings in Linton, Scottish Borders =

This is a list of listed buildings in the parish of Linton in the Scottish Borders, Scotland.

== List ==
Name	Location	Date Listed	Grid Ref. (Note: Sometimes known as OSGB36, the grid reference (where provided) is based on the British national grid reference system used by the Ordnance Survey. • "Guide to National Grid". Ordnance Survey. • "Get-a-map". Ordnance Survey.)	Geo-coordinates	Notes	LB Number (Note: Historic Environment Scotland assign a unique alphanumeric identifier to each designated site in Scotland, for listed buildings this always begins with "LB", for example "LB12345".)	Image
Clifton Park, Stables And Coach House Including Setted Courtyard				55°31′57″N 2°22′29″W	Category C(S)	44973	Upload Photo
Carlops, Lynburn Including Garden Grotto And Linburn Cottage				55°47′15″N 3°20′23″W	Category B	8384	Upload Photo
Carlops, Row Of 6 Cottages (Ferndale, Houlet, Amulree, Finlaggan, Blinkieknowe, Birkenbush)				55°47′21″N 3°20′23″W	Category B	8386	Upload Photo
Carlops, Row Of 4 Cottages (Springbank, Carberry, Langskaill, Jess)				55°47′26″N 3°20′22″W	Category C(S)	8390	Upload Photo
Carlops, Mill Lane, Bridge Over River Esk At Patie's Mill				55°47′30″N 3°20′20″W	Category C(S)	8364	Upload Photo
West Linton, The Loan, Srongarbh Including Railings, Boundary Walls, Garages, Garden Terraces And Steps, Swimming Pool, Pavilion And Other Ancillary Structures				55°45′25″N 3°21′51″W	Category A	51069	Upload another image
Carlops, Carlops Parish Church				55°47′21″N 3°20′23″W	Category C(S)	51627	Upload Photo
Linton Church, Stables And Outbuildings				55°31′47″N 2°21′41″W	Category C(S)	44978	Upload Photo
Old Graden Mansion House Including Outbuilding, Summerhouse, Boundary Walls, Gatepiers And Gates				55°33′45″N 2°19′22″W	Category C(S)	44980	Upload Photo
Carlops, Allan Ramsay Hotel				55°47′26″N 3°20′24″W	Category B	13687	Upload Photo
Carlops, Row Of 3 Cottages (Ashley, The Biggin, Weavers)				55°47′23″N 3°20′22″W	Category B	8387	Upload Photo
Paulswell Farmhouse And Steading				55°43′47″N 3°20′24″W	Category C(S)	8334	Upload Photo
Spitalhaugh House Including Stable And Bridge				55°43′59″N 3°20′06″W	Category A	8361	Upload Photo
Carlops, Vallence Cottage				55°47′29″N 3°20′20″W	Category C(S)	8362	Upload Photo
Medwynhead House				55°44′54″N 3°26′55″W	Category C(S)	8366	Upload Photo
Hoselaw Chapel (Church Of Scotland) Including Boundary Walls And Gate				55°34′45″N 2°18′58″W	Category A	18799	Upload another image See more images
West Linton, Main Street, Gifford Stones House				55°45′08″N 3°21′21″W	Category A	12888	Upload Photo
Carlops, Pentlands And Elphinstone				55°47′24″N 3°20′24″W	Category C(S)	8388	Upload Photo
West Linton, Bogsbank Road, Greenfield (Former St Andrew's Manse)				55°44′57″N 3°21′26″W	Category B	8353	Upload Photo
West Linton, War Memorial				55°45′01″N 3°21′23″W	Category C(S)	8356	Upload Photo
West Linton, Old Manor House				55°45′13″N 3°21′22″W	Category C(S)	8358	Upload another image
Medwyn House				55°45′22″N 3°22′06″W	Category B	8360	Upload Photo
Spitalhaugh, Doocot House				55°44′00″N 3°20′09″W	Category C(S)	51628	Upload Photo
Deepsykehead Farmhouse And Stable Offices				55°46′41″N 3°19′11″W	Category C(S)	13684	Upload Photo
West Linton, St Andrew's Parish Church Including Burial Ground, Gatepiers And Boundary Walls				55°45′03″N 3°21′22″W	Category B	12889	Upload another image See more images
Carlops, Carlops Mains Including Barn				55°47′20″N 3°20′18″W	Category B	8383	Upload Photo
Carlops, Drinking Fountain				55°47′28″N 3°20′22″W	Category B	8389	Upload Photo
West Linton, Clock Tower And Public Bell				55°45′06″N 3°21′21″W	Category B	8359	Upload another image
Kitley Brig, Lodge And Gatepiers				55°47′24″N 3°19′29″W	Category B	8365	Upload Photo
Clifton Park, Clifton Lodge Including Entrance Walls, Piers, Gatepiers And Boundary Wall				55°32′03″N 2°22′00″W	Category C(S)	44971	Upload Photo
Clifton Park, Ice House				55°31′58″N 2°22′20″W	Category C(S)	44972	Upload Photo
Clifton Park, Walled Garden Including Shed				55°31′52″N 2°22′32″W	Category C(S)	44974	Upload Photo
Frogden Farmhouse Including Outbuilding, Summerhouse, Sundial, Boundary Walls And Gatepiers				55°32′47″N 2°22′36″W	Category C(S)	44975	Upload Photo
Graden Farm, Cartshed And Granary				55°34′14″N 2°19′25″W	Category B	44976	Upload Photo
Lindenlea, Carlops				55°47′16″N 3°20′23″W	Category B	8385	Upload Photo
Garvald Home Farm, Courtyard Range Including Farmhouse And Separate Barn				55°43′42″N 3°26′15″W	Category B	8382	Upload Photo
West Linton, Carlops Road, Lynehurst				55°45′07″N 3°21′33″W	Category C(S)	51631	Upload Photo
Linton Manse Cottage				55°31′48″N 2°21′30″W	Category C(S)	44979	Upload Photo
West Linton, Chapel Brae, The Rectory (Former St Mungo's Manse)				55°45′06″N 3°21′33″W	Category C(S)	51630	Upload Photo
West Linton, St Andrew's Church Hall (Former Somervail School)				55°45′07″N 3°21′33″W	Category C(S)	51632	Upload Photo
Linton Church (Church Of Scotland) Including Graveyard, Boundary Walls, Gates And Gateposts				55°31′45″N 2°21′38″W	Category B	15254	Upload Photo
Garvald House Including Former Stables, Former Coach House, Walled Garden And Lodge				55°43′33″N 3°26′11″W	Category B	8381	Upload Photo
West Linton, Former Toll House				55°45′00″N 3°21′23″W	Category C(S)	8355	Upload Photo
West Linton, Raemartin Square, Raemartin House (Former Raemartin Hotel)				55°45′08″N 3°21′22″W	Category B	8357	Upload Photo
West Linton, Chapel Brae, St Mungo's Episcopal Church				55°45′07″N 3°21′33″W	Category C(S)	51629	Upload another image

== Key ==
The scheme for classifying buildings in Scotland is:

- Category A: "buildings of national or international importance, either architectural or historic; or fine, little-altered examples of some particular period, style or building type."
- Category B: "buildings of regional or more than local importance; or major examples of some particular period, style or building type, which may have been altered."
- Category C: "buildings of local importance; lesser examples of any period, style, or building type, as originally constructed or moderately altered; and simple traditional buildings which group well with other listed buildings."

In March 2016 there were 47,288 listed buildings in Scotland. Of these, 8% were Category A, and 50% were Category B, with the remaining 42% being Category C.
