= 1988 Skye and Lochalsh District Council election =

1988 Scottish local government election

← 1984	5 May 1988	1992 →

All 11 seats to Skye and Lochalsh District Council 6 seats needed for a majority

	First party	Second party
Party	Independent	Alliance
Seats won	9	1
Seat change	▼1	0
Popular vote	862	0
Percentage	100.0%	0.0%
Swing	0.0%	0.0%
Council Convener before election
John Farquhar Munro
Independent
Council Convener after election
John Farquhar Munro
Independent

Elections to the Skye and Lochalsh District Council took place in May 1988, alongside elections to the councils of Scotland's other districts.

Only two seats were contested and one went uncontested.

== Aggregate results ==
Skye and Lochalsh District Election Result 1988
Party	Seats	Gains	Losses	Net gain/loss	Seats %	Votes %	Votes	+/−
Independent	9			▼1	80.0	100.0	862	0.0
Alliance	1			0	10.0	0.0	0	0.0
Uncontested election	1							
