= Crailing =

Village in Scottish Borders, Scotland

Coordinates: 55°30′N 2°30′W

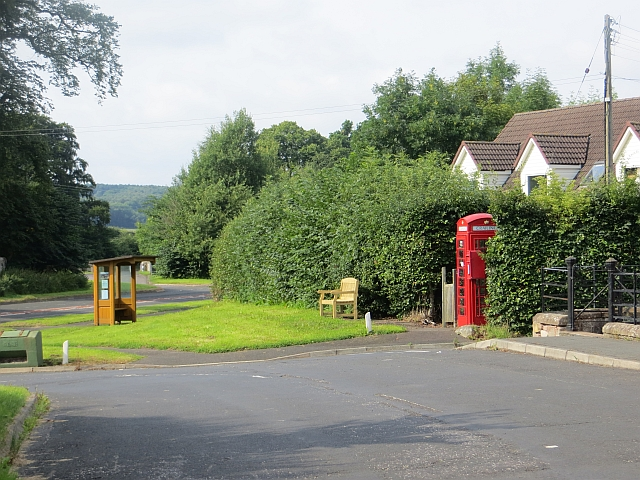
Crailing

Crailing is a village on the A698, in Teviotdale, 4m east of Jedburgh in the Scottish Borders area of Scotland, in the historic county of Roxburghshire.

Places nearby include Ancrum, Crailinghall, Eckford, Hownam, Kelso, Nisbet, Roxburghshire, the Oxnam Water, the River Teviot.

== Notable people and events ==
- Robert Aitken (preacher) (1800—1873)
- Thomas Oliver (architect) (1791—1857)
- Crailing played an important role in the early history of Clan Oliphant. Sir David Olifard, who is commonly held to be the progenitor of the clan, in 1141 got lands at Crailing from King David I of Scotland whose life Olifard had saved.
- Rory Bremner bought Crailing House near Jedburgh in September in 2009.

== See also ==
- List of places in the Scottish Borders
- List of places in Scotland
