= Slitrig Water =

Ttributary of the River Teviot, Scotland

Coordinates: 55°25′N 2°47′W

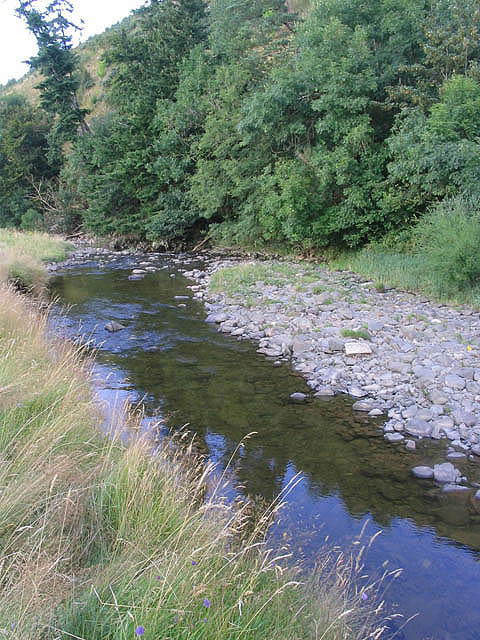
The Slitrig Water at Fleety Wood, 4 km from Dodburn, in the Scottish Borders

Slitrig Water (archaic Scots: Slitterick Waiter; current Southern Scots: Slitrig Witter), also known as the River Slitrig, is a river in the Scottish Borders. It is a tributary of the River Teviot.
