= Morebattle =

Coordinates: 55.51776°N 2.36343°W

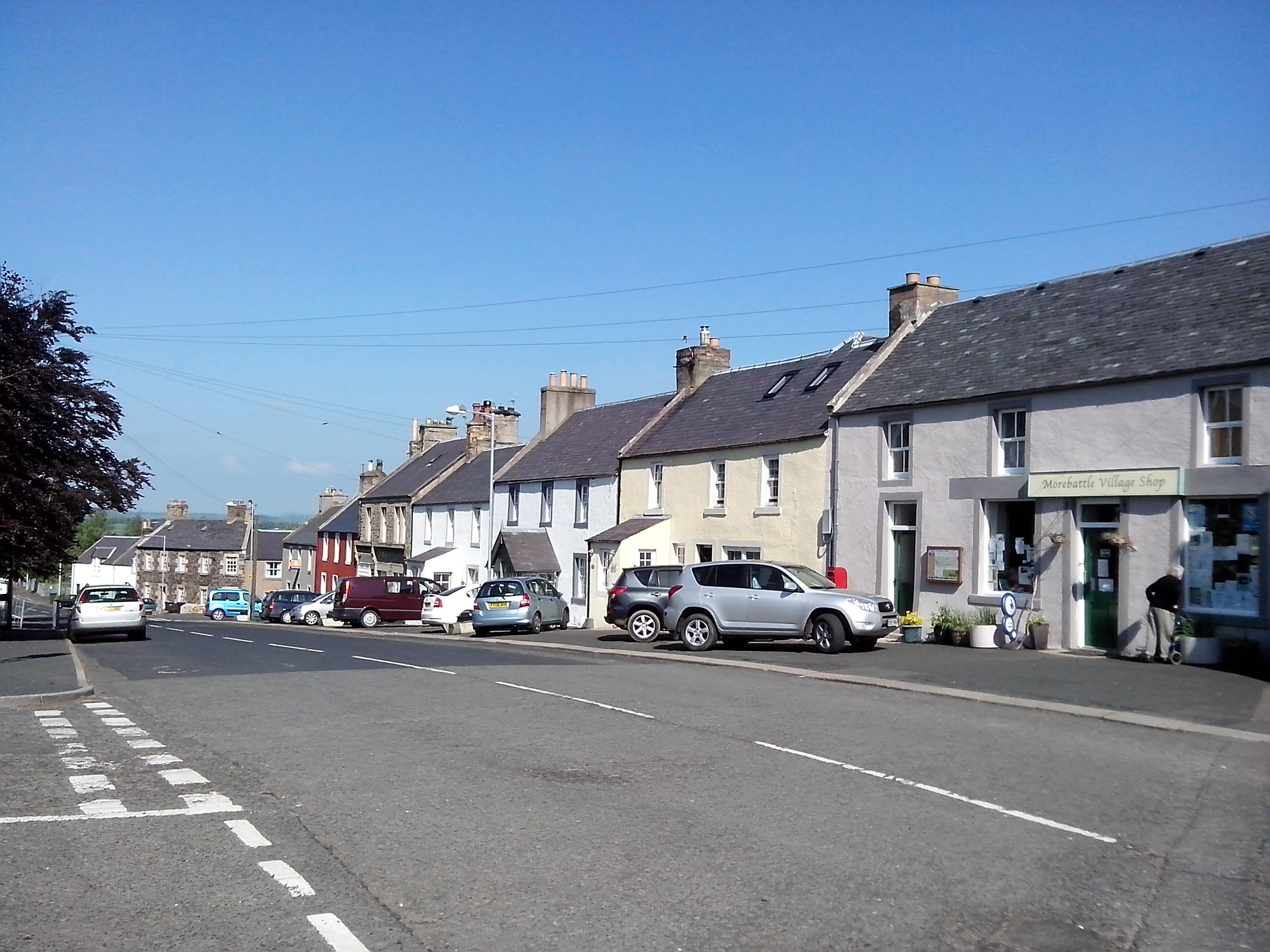
- Morebattle village centre

- Location within the Scottish Borders
- OS grid reference: NT771249
- Council area: Scottish Borders
- Lieutenancy area: Roxburgh, Ettrick and Lauderdale
- Country: Scotland
- Sovereign state: United Kingdom
- Post town: KELSO
- Postcode district: TD5
- Dialling code: 01573
- Police: Scotland
- Fire: Scottish
- Ambulance: Scottish
- UK Parliament: Berwickshire, Roxburgh and Selkirk
- Scottish Parliament: Ettrick, Roxburgh and Berwickshire

Morebattle is a village in the Scottish Borders area of Scotland, on the B6401, seven miles south of Kelso, Scottish Borders, beside the Kale Water, a tributary of the River Teviot. The St. Cuthbert's Way long distance footpath passes through the village.

Surrounding villages include Cessford and Eckford to the west; Linton to the north; Town Yetholm and Kirk Yetholm to the east; and Hownam and Mowhaugh to the south.

== History ==
The place-name comes from the Anglian mere-bōðl - "dwelling place by the lake" (Linton Loch). No evidence of any battles (the simplistic origin) exists.

Morebattle parish church is noted as being in the diocese of Glasgow from approximately 1116. It stands on a prominence overlooking the Kale Water. The building was engulfed by fire in 1544 and rebuilt. The present structure dates mostly from the 1750s with extensions being erected in 1899 and 1903 by Hardy & Wight.

The village has a "Teapot Street" which according to local legend (unlikely to be true) was named by Sir Walter Scott, who, passing through the village one day, noticed the wives in the street carrying teapots to the nearby Kale Water to picnic, and remarked, "that must be Teapot Street."

Linton Loch was a substantial loch between Morebattle and Linton, but it was drained as part of the 19th century agricultural improvements in the area.

== Dialect of Morebattle ==
The distinctive traditional Southern Scots dialect of Morebattle was the subject of a study by Swiss dialectologist Rudolph Zai, published in 1942.

== Famous residents ==
- James Thomson, the Ednam poet, was born in Morebattle.
- Robert Davidson, poet, lived and was buried in Morebattle, where he is commemorated.

== Morebattle Hillfort ==
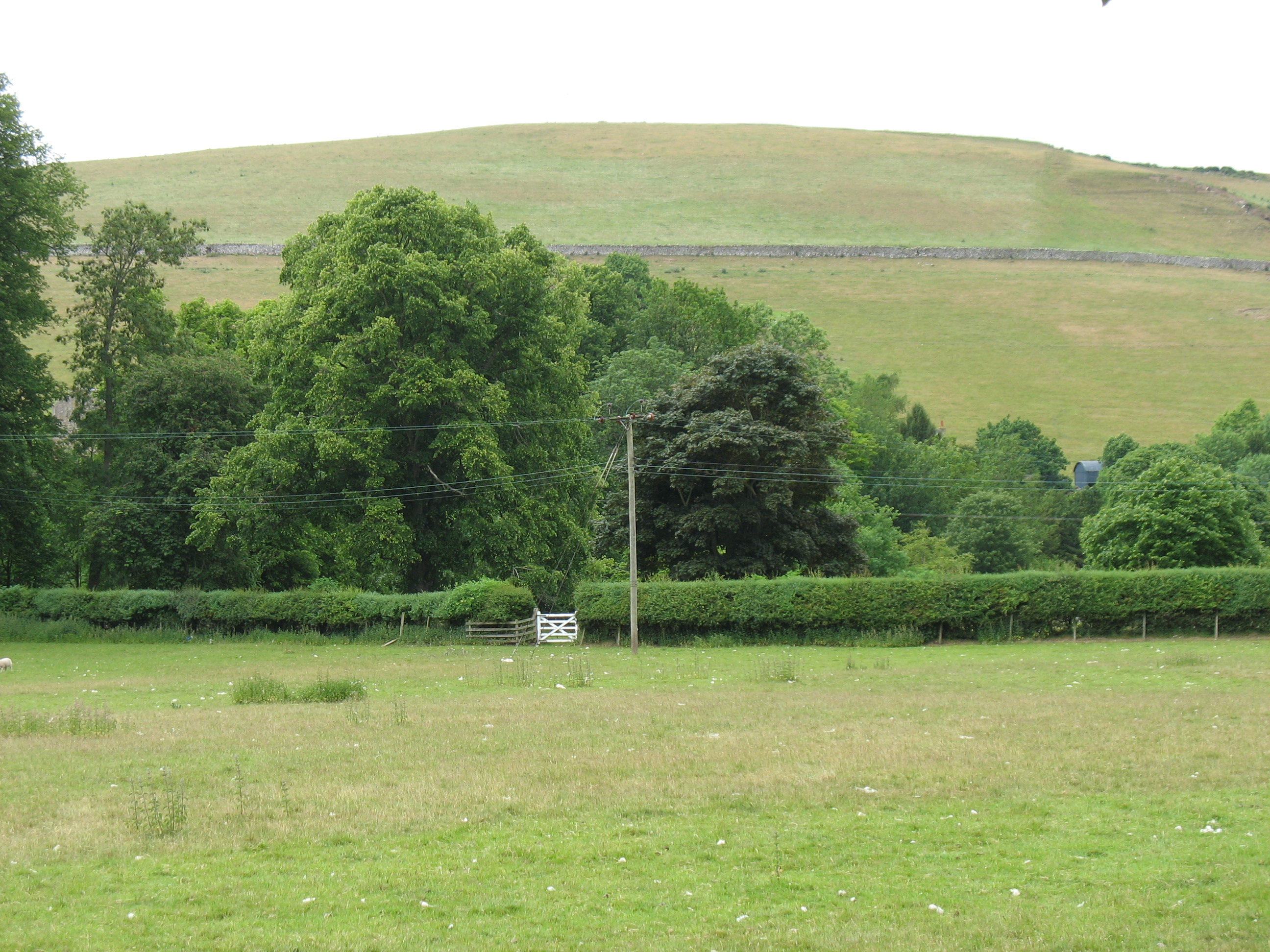
Morebattle Hill, viewed from the west

On the summit Morebattle Hill, half-a-mile south of the village, is the remains of an Iron Age hillfort (grid reference NT771239). The fort is shaped like an elongated letter D, with its main axis lying northeast to southwest. The fort measures 190 metres in length by 70 metres in greatest width within a single rampart. The remains of a small settlement can be seen at the northeast end of the fort.

About 400 metres to the northeast, on a spur of the hill (grid reference NT774242), is a second smaller fort, largely levelled by cultivation. It originally measured 70 metres by 50 metres within double ramparts. The northeast end has been destroyed by a later quarry.

== See also ==
- List of places in the Scottish Borders
- List of places in Scotland
