= Nisbet, Scottish Borders =

Village & parish in Scottish Borders, Scotland

Coordinates: 55.524°N 2.519°W

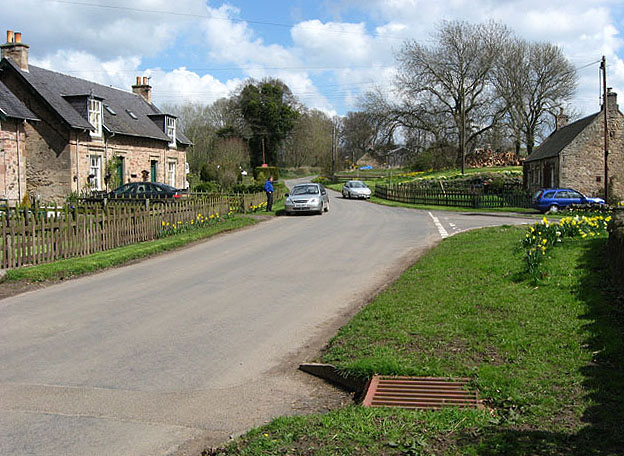
Nisbet

Nisbet is a small hamlet on the B6400, in Roxburghshire, along the River Teviot, in the Scottish Borders area of Scotland. It is located 5.5 kilometres (3.4 mi) north of Jedburgh and 5 kilometres (3.1 mi) south of Roxburgh.

The village has several Nisbet location names: Nisbet, East Nisbet, West Nisbet, Nisbetmill, Upper Nisbet, and Upper Nisbet Moor. However, none of these are connected to the family of Nisbet of that Ilk, who built Nisbet House in Berwickshire. There was a Nisbet family located a short distance from this Nisbet village at Cessford Burn from 1665 to 1822.

The Rev. Samuel Rutherford was born in the village of Nisbet about 1600.

== See also ==
- Nisbet House
- List of places in the Scottish Borders
