= Sprouston =

Village in Scottish Borders, Scotland

Coordinates: 55.610°N 2.388°W

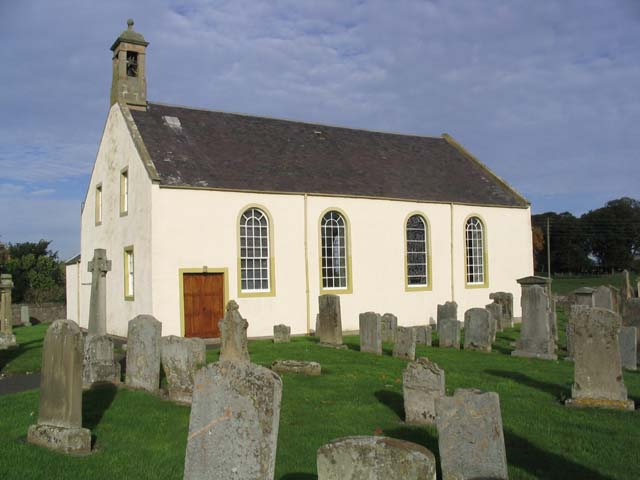
- 17th-century Kirk of Sprouston

- Location within the Scottish Borders
- OS grid reference: NT7584735359
- Council area: Scottish Borders
- Lieutenancy area: Roxburgh, Ettrick and Lauderdale
- Country: Scotland
- Sovereign state: United Kingdom
- Post town: Kelso
- Postcode district: TD5 8
- Dialling code: 01573
- Police: Scotland
- Fire: Scottish
- Ambulance: Scottish
- UK Parliament: Berwickshire, Roxburgh and Selkirk
- Scottish Parliament: Ettrick, Roxburgh and Berwickshire

Sprouston is a village, parish and former feudal barony in the Scottish Borders area of Scotland, as well as the historic county of Roxburghshire, located 2 miles north-east of Kelso.

The village is close to the south bank of the river Tweed (200 yards away), which forms the northern boundary of the parish. The eastern border of the parish is also the border with England and with the parish of Carham, Northumberland in that country, Sprouston being the last Scottish parish on the south side of the Tweed. The parish of Linton borders Sprouston to the south and the parishes of Eckford and Kelso to the west. The parish forms a rough square shape about 4 miles across and has an area of 8637 acres. Sprouston Community Council covers roughly the same area as the civil parish.

== History ==
The earliest mention of this parish in an authentic document is in the foundation charter of Selkirk of 1114 and it is also mentioned in the charter given to Kelso Abbey in 1128. Sprouston was given as part of the dowry of Margaret de Scotland, illegitimate daughter of William the Lion and passed to her son William de Vesci. It was in the Lempitlaw family before being granted by Robert I of Scotland to William Francis, whose family held it until the 15th century when it passed to the Douglas family. Sprouston was in the hands of the Hamilton family in the sixteenth century. In 1554, the grange farm of Kelso Abbey at Sprouston was burnt by Robin Ker, a Scottish rebel who was based at Wark Castle in England.

Sprouston Kirk, completed in 1781, is a replica of an older (12th century) building which was sited nearby. The original parish of Sprouston, in the 18th century, belonged to the Duke of Roxburghe, whose seat is at Floors Castle. The Kirk is known locally as "The Sweet Pea Kirk", a reference to an event commemorated in Henry Donald's book 'A Bunch of Sweet Peas', which tells the story of the Reverend Denholm Fraser and his wife, who took 3rd and 1st place respectively in the 1911 Daily Mail Sweet Pea Competition. Fraser used the prize money to build the chancel for Sprouston Kirk. In 2011, to mark the centenary, the village held a three-day 'Sweet Pea Festival'.

The Tweedmouth to Sprouston branch railway opened in 1849, when Sprouston station served as the station for Kelso. Sprouston railway station was closed to passengers in 1955 and the line was closed in 1968.

Within the parish on the eastern side is Holefield. This farm was the birthplace and childhood of Scottish Border poet and Australian bush balladeer Will H. Ogilvie (1869–1963) before he went to Australia in 1889. The Ogilvie family had provided over three hundred years of managing estates in the Borders area, the most recently then in the service to the Duke of Buccleuch. His poems and subjects included Border life and locales, such as the nearby Bowmont Water, and Cheviot Hills (Home):

I hear the plough's creak, and the trampling Clydes,

The bicker of the darting gulls above the new-turned loam,

And the March wind from Cheviot roaring as he rides

Down the ribboned leas of Home.

The former barony of Lempitlaw, which forms the southern portion of the parish, was originally a separate parish. At an unknown date, before 1790, it was united with the parish of Sprouston.

== Geography ==
Two ridges of slight gradient run across from north-east to south-west in the parish, named Hadden Rig (height 541 ft), running through the centre and Lempitlaw, sited along the southern boundary. The first ridge, which has a commanding view over the Tweed, was the site of the Battle of Haddon Rig in 1542, a significant Scottish victory.

Sprouston is located roughly 200 metres south of the River Tweed, and the Sprouston stretch is considered as one of the top ranking fishing beats on the river.
