= Cessford Castle =

Castle in Scottish Borders, Scotland

Coordinates: 55°30′27.74″N 2°24′50.69″W

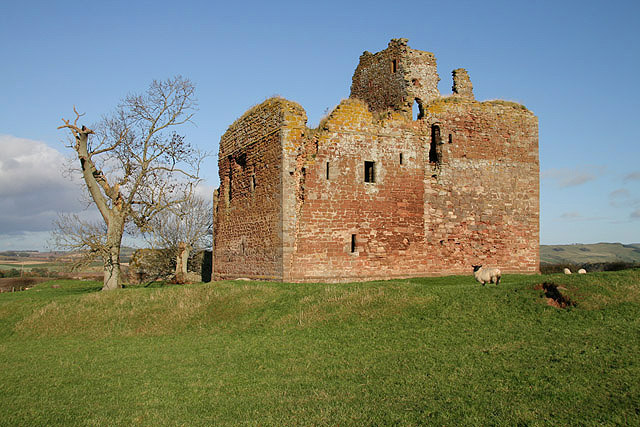
Cessford Castle

Cessford Castle, is a large ruined mid-15th century L-plan castle near the village of Cessford, midway Jedburgh and Kelso, in the historic county of Roxburghshire, now a division of the Scottish Borders. The Castle is caput of the Barony of Cessford, and the principal stronghold of the Kerr family, notorious Border Reivers, many of whom served as Wardens of the Middle March.

== History ==
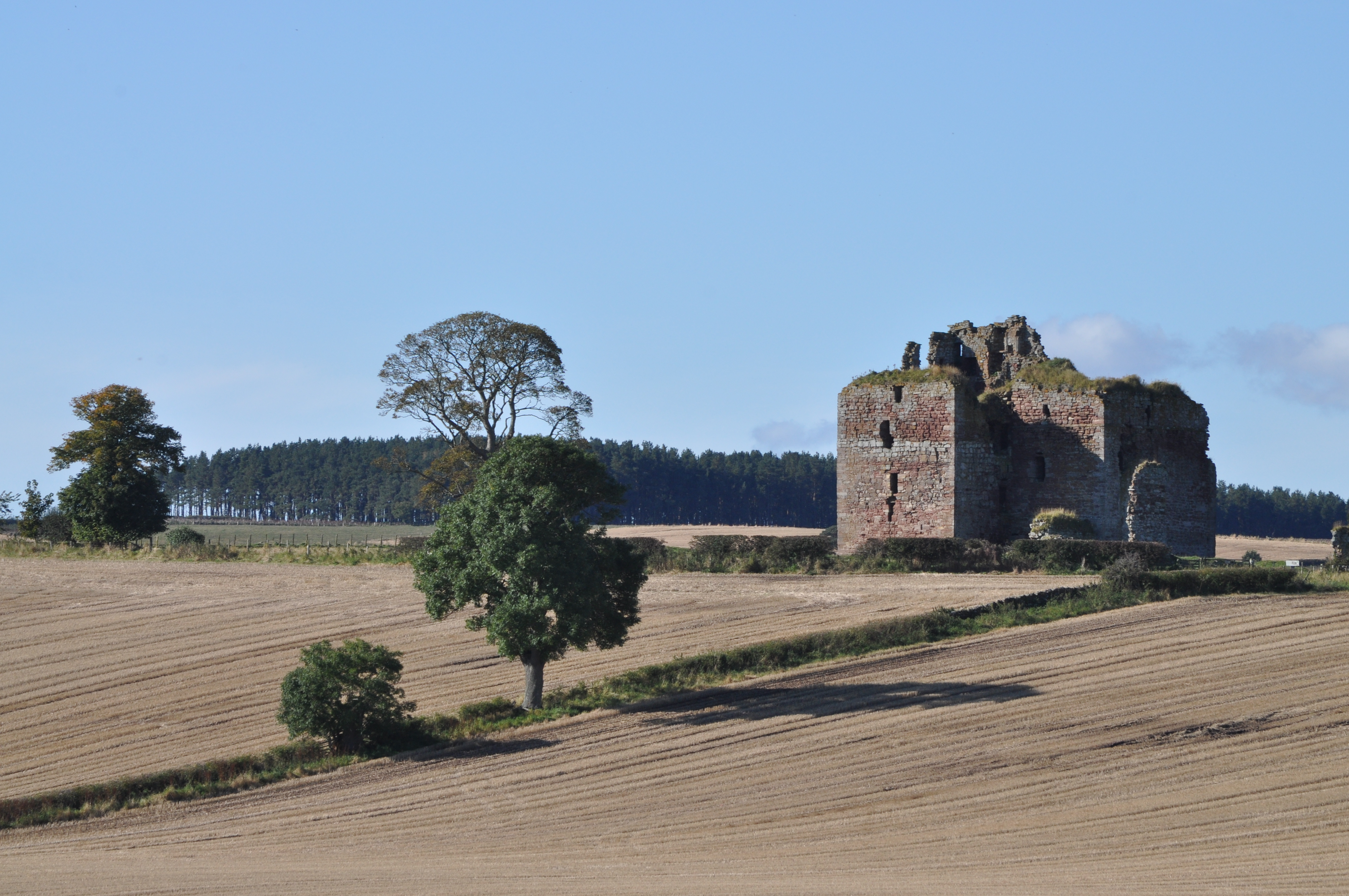
Cessford Castle within its landscape

Cessford was built around 1450 by Andrew Ker, an ancestor of Robert Ker, 1st Earl of Roxburghe, and of the Dukes of Roxburghe. It is from this place that the Duke takes his subsidiary titles: Baron Ker of Cessford, and Marquess of Bowmont and Cessford. It is possible that the castle incorporates parts of an earlier structure. The fortalice was built on an L-plan, with a main keep with a wing of almost the same magnitude. With up to six storeys, two of which were barrel vaulted, and with walls up to 13 feet (4.0 m) thick, it was a formidable place of defence. The angle of the building was enclosed by a single-storey defensive gatehouse, and the whole was surrounded by a barmekin and defensive earthworks, a fact that is corroborated by the record of English troops having to use an escalade to gain access to the castle courtyard during the siege of 1523. The castle was besieged in 1523 by the Earl of Surrey who remarked: "It might never have been taken had the assailed been able to go on defending". The castle was abandoned in 1650.

== Historical incidents ==
After Berwick upon Tweed was captured by Richard, Duke of Gloucester in July 1482, Henry Percy, Earl of Northumberland burnt a number of places in the area. At the end of his campaign, on 22 August 1482 he knighted twenty of his soldiers at the "mains of Sessford."

== See also ==
- Cessford Burn
- Scottish castles

- List of castles in Scotland
