= Hownam =

Village in the Scottish Borders, Scotland

Coordinates: 55.46568°N 2.35187°W

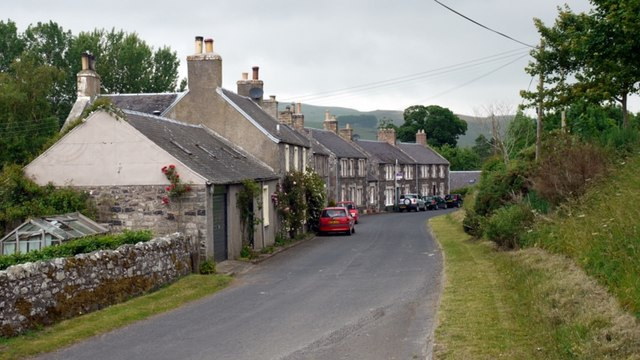
- Hownam village centre

- Location within the Scottish Borders
- OS grid reference: NT778191
- Council area: Scottish Borders
- Lieutenancy area: Roxburgh, Ettrick and Lauderdale
- Country: Scotland
- Sovereign state: United Kingdom
- Post town: KELSO
- Postcode district: TD5
- Dialling code: 01573
- Police: Scotland
- Fire: Scottish
- Ambulance: Scottish
- UK Parliament: Berwickshire, Roxburgh and Selkirk
- Scottish Parliament: Ettrick, Roxburgh and Berwickshire

Hownam or Hounam is a small village and parish situated 8 miles east of Jedburgh in the Scottish Borders area of Scotland, near the Anglo-Scottish border, within the boundaries of the historic county of Roxburghshire.

Hownam lies south of Morebattle on the Kale Water. The parish borders England and has, within its boundaries, the Roman road of Dere Street and the Pennymuir Roman camps. Hownam first appears in the written charters in the 12th century. The origin of the name is uncertain, but may indicate a tribal name, "the Hunas". The village itself is a small group of houses in a row on one side of the road. The village church is at the north end of the village. The church was reshaped in the 1750s and further modernised in the 1840s, and again following a fire in 1907.

Local nurseryman George Taylor was born at Hounam Grange in 1803. He emigrated to Kalamazoo, Michigan in 1855, and became known as George "Celery" Taylor because he introduced commercial celery growing to the United States.
