= Linton, Scottish Borders =

Coordinates: 55°31′49″N 2°21′31″W

Linton
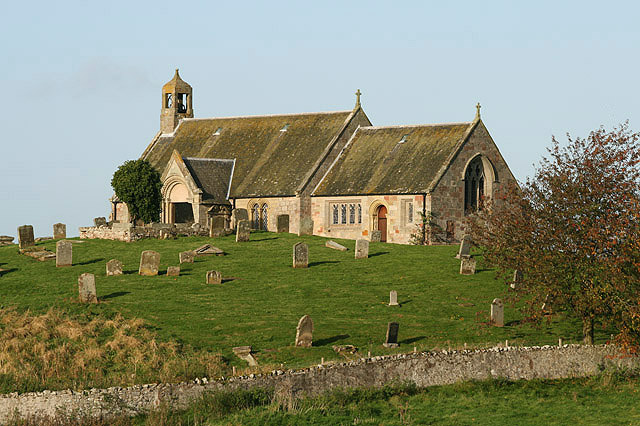
- Linton Church

- Location within the Scottish Borders
- OS grid reference: NT774263
- Council area: Scottish Borders
- Lieutenancy area: Roxburgh, Ettrick and Lauderdale
- Country: Scotland
- Sovereign state: United Kingdom
- Post town: KELSO
- Postcode district: TD5
- Dialling code: 01573
- Police: Scotland
- Fire: Scottish
- Ambulance: Scottish
- UK Parliament: Berwickshire, Roxburgh and Selkirk
- Scottish Parliament: Ettrick, Roxburgh and Berwickshire

Linton is a small village in the Scottish Borders area of Scotland. It is situated a mile north of the village of Morebattle.

== History ==
People have lived in the area since prehistoric times: on the summit of Linton Hill there is an Iron Age fort.

Linton was a substantial village in the Middle Ages. The Somerville family first appear in the records as being from Linton in 1136. There was a tower built by the family close to the church, but it was destroyed by the forces of Henry VIII, during the Rough Wooing, and nothing now remains of it.

Linton Church stands on top of a sandy mound, and used to be surrounded by water and marshland. The history of the church dates back to the 12th century, but the current building dates from 1911 and like its predecessors it has no solid foundations. The porch door has been inset with the "Somervail Stone" showing a knight fighting two beasts which is a link to the story of the Worm of Linton. A local legend concerning the founding of the church states that a young man killed a priest and was condemned to death. His two sisters pleaded for his life, which was granted on condition that they should sift as much sand as would form a mound on which to build a church. The sisters succeeded in the task, the church was built, and the man was freed.

Linton Loch was a substantial loch between Linton and Morebattle, but it was drained as part of the 19th century agricultural improvements in the area.

== The Worm of Linton ==
During the 12th century, the area of Linton was being terrorised by a dragon-like monster known as The Linton Worm. One of the Somerville family—some say William while others cite John, both Lairds of Lariston—set out to put an end to the people's predicament. He arrived at Linton Loch or bog and slew the beast with a lance through the throat. The panel above the entry porch of the church is said to celebrate the event. The Linton Worm is recorded by Walter Scott in his Minstrelsy of the Scottish Border Volume II First Edition 1802 pp.90 - 92. '.
