= Lempitlaw =

Hamlet in Sprouston, Roxburghshire, Scottish Borders

Coordinates: 55°35′16″N 2°20′23″W

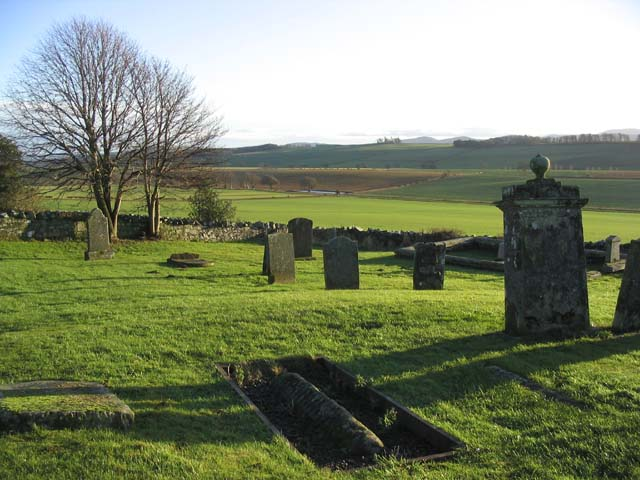
Lempitlaw Churchyard The original Lempitlaw church was a ruin by the late 18th century, although the churchyard was still in use

Lempitlaw is a hamlet, former parish and former feudal barony in the Scottish Borders area of Scotland, as well as the historic county of Roxburghshire.

== History ==
The parish was joined with Sprouston in the 16th century. The former parish forms the southern part of the current Sprouston parish. The remains of the kirk (church) were visible until the late 18th century.

The barony of Lempitlaw was granted by David I of Scotland to Richard Germyn. In the 19th century the barony was in the possession of the Duke of Buccleuch,

Lempitlaw Airfield is a 600m grass strip used by General Aviation.
