= Eckford, Scottish Borders =

Village in Scottish Borders, Scotland

Coordinates: 55°31′38″N 2°27′42″W

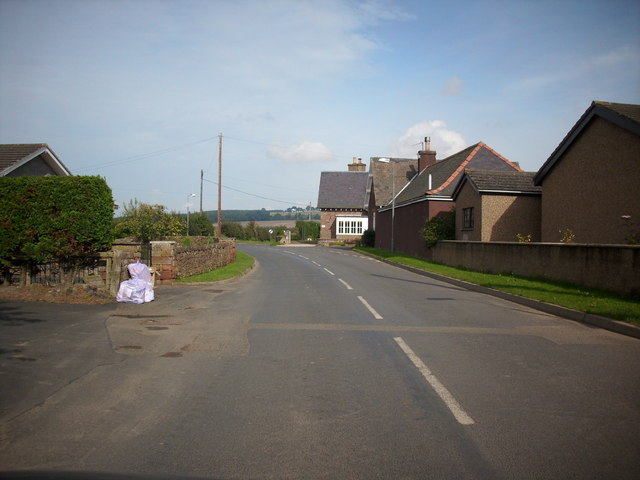

Eckford is a small village located between the larger towns of Kelso and Jedburgh in the Scottish Borders. The village is in close proximity to both the River Teviot and its tributary the Kale Water, and the A698 and the B6401 which run approximately parallel to the respective rivers.

The village itself consists of around 20 houses, situated off Eckford road, the minor Well road and the historic drove road, the Loaning.

== Eckford Village Hall ==
The village hall was built in 1930, funded primarily by local subscription and fund raising, and sits in the heart of the village, and is its last remaining public building (previously there was also a school (1963), post office and shop). The hall remains an important hub within the village and hosts events throughout the year.

== Eckford Parish ==
The parish of Eckford consists of Caverton, Cessford and Eckford.

- Caverton comprises Caverton Mill (by the Kale), Old Caverton, Caverton Hillhead, and Caverton Mains.
- Cessford comprises Cessford Castle, the Cessford Burn, and Cessford Moor.
- Eckford comprises Eckfordmoss and Mosstower.

Eckford's church, which sits close to the River Teviot and around 3/4 of a mile from the village was closed for safety reasons in the late 2000s due to required repairs to the bell tower, the cost of which proved insurmountable. The graveyard surrounding the church remains in use, however, and contains a remarkable circular tower, used in the 19th century to guard newly buried bodies against the risk of body snatchers.

== In History ==
The name Eckford is locally accepted to be a variant on Oakford, meaning simply a ford by oak trees. It has also been suggested independently, however, to mean ford by the church. It was known as Eckeforde in 1200 and Hecford in 1220. The prefix Ecc is from the Latin ecclesia meaning church.

On 17 October 1557 a Scottish army led by the Earl of Huntly halted at Eckford. There the Scottish lords held a consultation, and considering the time of year, the foul weather, and English preparations against them, decided not to attack Wark as Mary of Guise had instructed them. The next day they crossed the border and approached Wark Castle with their artillery but then returned to Scotland.

== Moss Tower ==
The ruins of Moss Tower remain in Eckford parish. This castle was damaged by the English commanded by Lord Dacre in 1523, and again in 1544, and 1570.

John Ormeston of Ormeston wrote to members English Forster family in November 1559. He was the Earl of Bothwell's bailiff, living at Moss Tower, and was worried by news that an English army was coming to Scotland to aid the Protestant Lords of the Congregation. He hoped they would warn him of any trouble.

The tower later belonged to the rebel earl Francis Stewart, 5th Earl of Bothwell, who used it as refuge in March 1594, and his wife Margaret Douglas stayed there.

== See also ==
- List of places in the Scottish Borders
- List of places in Scotland
