= Kale Water =

River in Scottish Borders, Scotland

Coordinates: 55°32′N 2°28′W

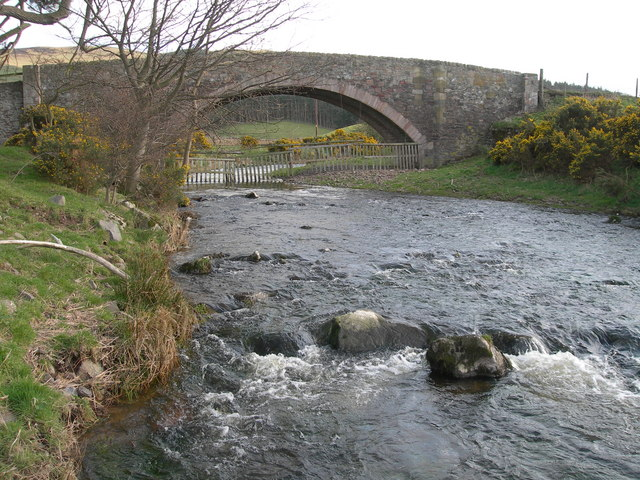
Kale Water, just east of Morebattle

The Kale Water is a 20 miles (32 km) long tributary of the River Teviot in the Scottish Borders area of Scotland. Its feeder burns in the Cheviot Hills are the Long Burn, Hawkwillow Burn and the Grindstone Burn, east of Leithope Forest near the Anglo-Scottish Border.

The Kale continues northwards via Upper Hindhope and Chatto to Hownam, the Hownam Rings and Morebattle Hill. At Morebattle the river turns to the west and, near Caverton Mill, the Kale receives another burn, the Cessford Burn. It continues alongside the B6401, past Grahamslaw to join the Teviot at Kalemouth and the Kalemouth Suspension Bridge.

== See also ==
- List of places in the Scottish Borders
- List of places in Scotland
