= Skye and Lochalsh =

Government district of the former Highland Region of Scotland

Coordinates: 57°13′N 5°53′W

- District
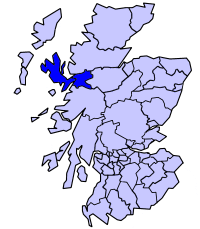
- History
  - Created: 16 May 1975
  - Abolished: 31 March 1996
  - Succeeded by: Highland
  - HQ: Portree
- Contained within
  - Region: Highland Region

Skye and Lochalsh (Scottish Gaelic: 'An t-Eilean Sgitheanach agus Loch Aillse') was a local government district, created in 1975 as one of eight districts within the Highland region in Scotland. It included the Isle of Skye and the Lochalsh area on the mainland. The main offices of the council were in Portree, on the Isle of Skye. The district was abolished in 1996 when Highland was made a single-tier council area.

== History ==
The district was created in 1975 under the Local Government (Scotland) Act 1973, which abolished Scotland's counties, burghs and landward districts and replaced them with a two-tier system of regions and districts. The new district covered two former districts: the Skye district from Inverness-shire (covering the Isle of Skye and neighbouring Inner Hebridean islands) and the South West district from Ross and Cromarty (covering the parishes of Lochalsh, Kintail and Glenshiel).

Skye and Lochalsh District Council was a district-level authority, with regional-level functions provided by the Highland Regional Council, based in Inverness.

The districts and regions created in 1975 were abolished in 1996, under the Local Government etc. (Scotland) Act 1994 and replaced with single-tier council areas. The Highland region became one of the new council areas.

== Political control ==
The first election to the district council was held in 1974, initially operating as a shadow authority alongside the outgoing authorities until the district and its council formally came into being on 16 May 1975. Throughout the council's existence a majority of the seats were held by independents:

Party in control	Years
Independent	1975–1996

== Premises ==
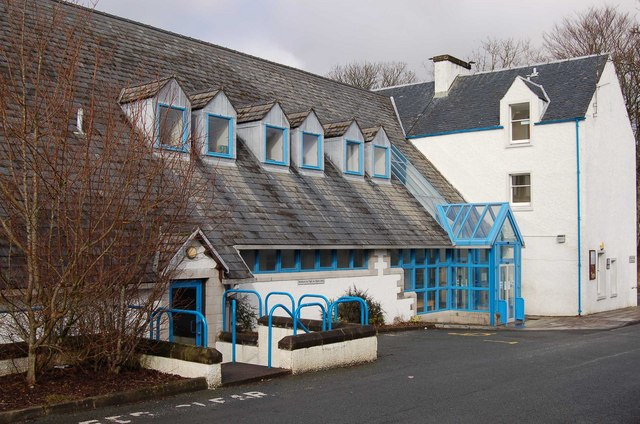
Tigh-na-Sgire, Park Lane, Portree: District council's headquarters

In 1976, shortly after the council's creation, it bought the former drill hall on Park Lane in Portree to serve as its headquarters. The converted building was given the Scots Gaelic name of Tigh-na-Sgire ("the District House"). After the district council's abolition in 1996 the building passed to the Highland Council, who continue to use it as an area office. Skye and Lochalsh District Council also had an area office in Kyle of Lochalsh.

== Coat of arms ==
Coat of arms of Skye and Lochalsh District Council

The Skye and Lochalsh District Council coat of arms, granted by Lord Lyon King of Arms in 1987, featured a wavy blue fess across the centre of the shield for the Kyle of Lochalsh. Above this were emblems for the three main historic families of the Isle of Skye (Macleod of Macleod, Macdonald of Sleat and Mackinnon) and below it a stag's head from the arms of Mackenzie of Kintail for the Lochalsh area. The gold coronet above the arms was a special pattern reserved for the arms of Scottish district councils, and was topped by thistle-heads.

== See also ==
- Politics of the Highland council area
- Subdivisions of Scotland
