= River Teviot =

River in Scottish Borders, Scotland

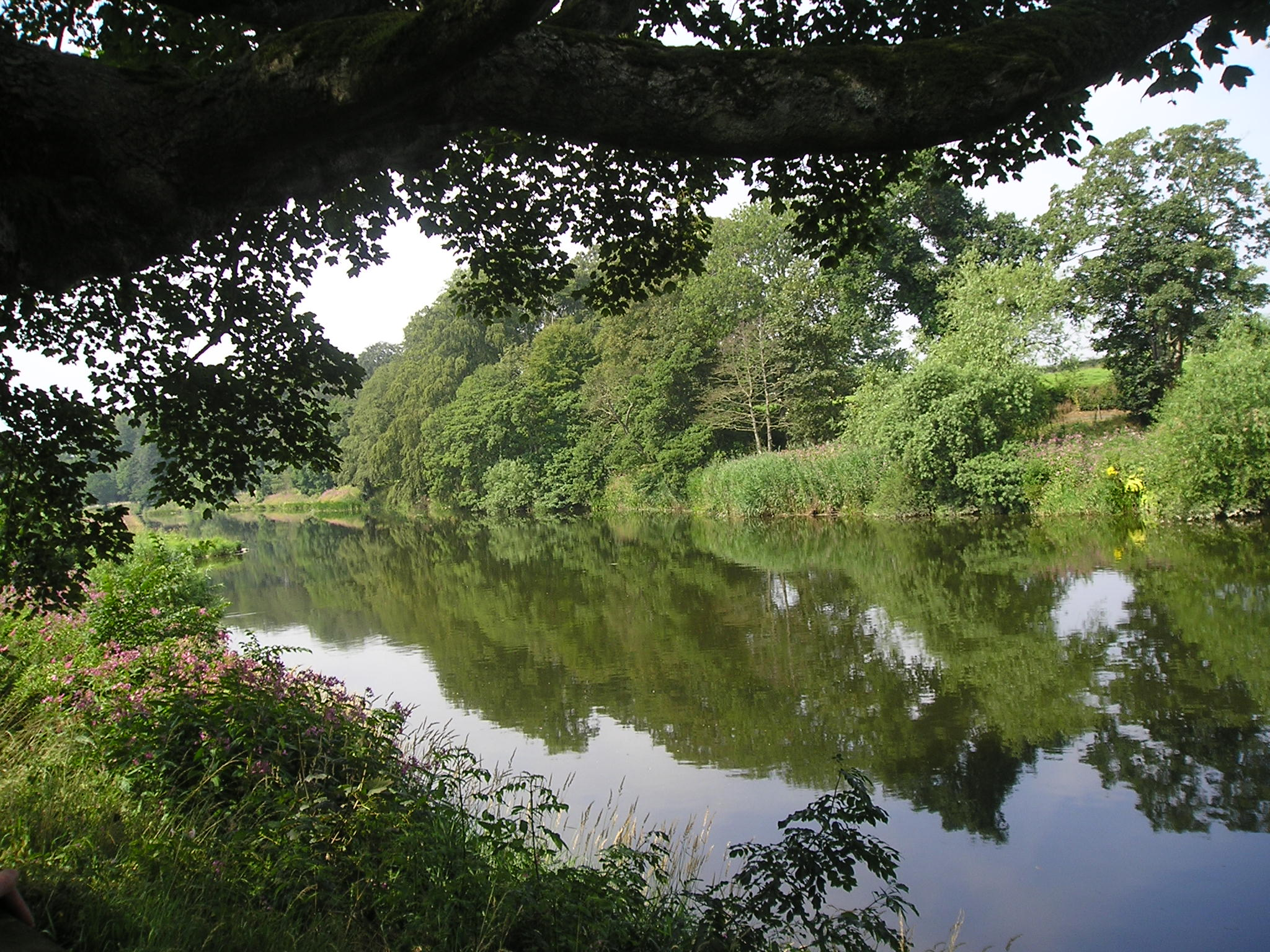
- View of the River Teviot

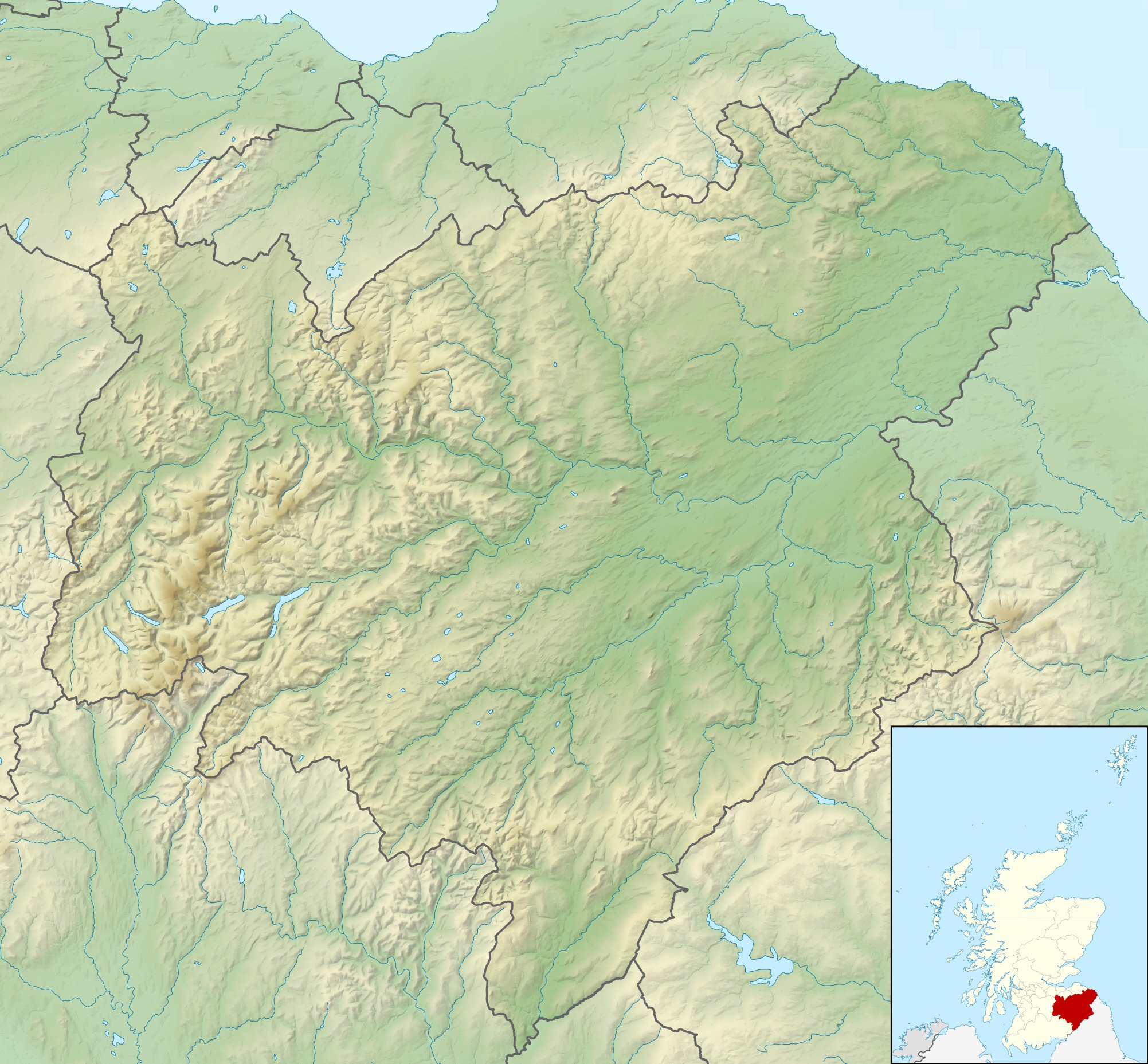
- Location within Scottish Borders Location within Scotland
- Native name: Abhainn Tìbhiot (Scottish Gaelic)

Physical characteristics
- Source
  - location: Scotland
  - coordinates: 55.331°N 2.955°W
- Mouth
  - location: Scotland

Basin features
- River system: River Tweed

The River Teviot (/ˈtiːviət/; Scottish Gaelic: Abhainn Tìbhiot), or Teviot Water, is a river of the Scottish Borders area of Scotland, and is the largest tributary of the River Tweed by catchment area. The Teviot is an important river for wildlife, especially the Atlantic salmon, but in recent years has witnessed at least four extreme flooding events.

== Course ==
It rises in the western foothills of Comb Hill on the border of Dumfries and Galloway. It flows north-eastwards through Teviotdale and past Teviothead, the Colterscleuch Monument, Broadhaugh, Branxholme and Branxholme Castle.

The Teviot passes through Hawick and Lanton, past the Timpendean Tower and the village of Ancrum, Harestanes and Monteviot, Nisbet and Roxburgh, before joining the River Tweed to the southwest of Kelso.

The Borders Abbeys Way keeps close company with the Teviot on its journey to the Tweed.

== Catchment and hydrometry ==
The river flows across a lowland catchment with shale underlying the surface. The headwaters are mostly moorland, woodland and some hill grazing. More intensively worked land for agriculture is found nearer the eastern end of the river where it flows into the Tweed.

The Teviot has a history of significant flooding, particularly in Hawick. Flooding in 2005 caused extensive damage involving "millions of pounds' worth of damage", and the river level was recorded at 10 feet 10 inches (3.3 m). .

After two more extreme flooding events in 2015, and 2016 (when Jedburgh and Hawick saw water levels rising more than 5 ft or 1.5 m in an hour), a £44 million scheme was launched to provide the town with the requisite flood defences needed to extreme events occurring. Delays to the scheme meant that it wasn't started until 2020, by which time the town was subjected to extreme flooding again when Storm Ciara hit in January 2020. Flooding was so bad, that one restaurant on the bank of the river collapsed into the floodwaters.

Following this series of events, a major flood protection scheme for Hawick was developed, incorporating flood walls, embankments and other measures along the River Teviot and its tributaries.

== Economy ==
The river is used by the Borders Whisky Distillery at Hawick for cooling water and processed water. Historically, the river had many mills along its length, and the site of one in Hawick, at Cobel Cauld, was approved to be used with a reverse Archimedes Screw to generate hydroelectricity in 2019, with an expected completion date of 2021. Hawick Community Energy Group had outlined an ambition to generate 300 megawatt hours per year (enough to power 100 homes) but the plans were later abandoned after local planning opposition forced a pause in the project's delivery.

== Ecology ==
The river was designated as a site of special scientific interest in 2001. The designation applies to the full length of the river and other tributaries of the River Tweed. The Teviot is noted for its wildlife, including salmon, otters, lamprey and forget-me-nots. The river is an important site for breeding grounds of the Atlantic salmon.

== Tributaries ==
The principal tributaries of the Teviot are the Allan Water which enters its right bank at Newmill, the Borthwick Water which enters its left bank between Branxholme and Hawick, the Slitrig Water which enters via the right bank in Hawick itself, the Ale Water entering via the left bank at Ancrum, the Jed Water on the right bank just downstream and the Kale Water which enters on the right bank between Crailing and Roxburgh.

== See also ==
- List of places in the Scottish Borders
- List of places in Scotland
