= List of Church of Scotland synods and presbyteries =

The Church of Scotland has a Presbyterian structure, which means it is organised under a hierarchy of courts. Traditionally there were four levels of courts: the Kirk Session (at congregational level), the Presbytery (at local area level), the Synod (at a regional level) and the General Assembly (the Church's highest court). Synods were abolished in 1993.

It is the presbyteries which have oversight of parishes and pastoral responsibility for parish ministers, and the Kirk Sessions of the individual parishes are subordinated to them. A parish minister is answerable to the Presbytery, not to the Kirk Session.

== History and mergers before 2020 ==
The original Presbyteries of the Church of Scotland were created in April 1581, about 20 years after the Reformation in Scotland and the establishment of the Church of Scotland. In 1581, the original 600 parishes were grouped together into about 50 presbyteries, 13 of which were erected immediately: Edinburgh, St Andrews, Dundee, Perth, Stirling, Glasgow, Ayr, Irvine, Haddington, Dunbar, Chirnside, Linlithgow and Dunfermline. Others were erected in the years immediately following: Peebles, Dalkeith, Duns, Jedburgh, Selkirk.

In 1929, there was a large amount of reorganisation, due to the merger of the United Free Church of Scotland and the Church of Scotland. At the close of that year, 66 Presbyteries were recognised in Scotland, together with two Continental Presbyteries and 13 Foreign Mission Presbyteries which, were given representation in the General Assembly. The Foreign Mission Presbyteries were: Madras, Nagpur, Bengal, Santalia, Rajputana, Western India, Hyderabad, Manchuria, Jamaica, South Africa, Calabar, Gold Coast, Livingstonia. At the General Assembly of 1931 the Presbyteries of Blantyre, Kenya, Easter Himalaya and Punjab were added, making a total of 17 Overseas Presbyteries.

Scottish local government was reorganised in 1975, creating a new system of regions and districts to replace the long-standing counties and burghs. The General Assembly of the Church of Scotland also ordered a major reorganisation of presbyteries in the mid-1970s, redrawing presbytery boundaries to make them broadly contiguous with the then-new local government boundaries. An example was the union of the former Presbyteries of Cupar and St Andrews, creating a new Presbytery of St Andrews (which also included the Parishes of Newport-on-Tay, Wormit and Tayport, previously in the Presbytery of Dundee). This new Presbytery's boundaries mirrored the North East Fife District Council.

Following further local government reorganisation in the 1990s (replacing regions and districts with a single-tier system of councils), it was proposed to further considerably reduce the number of Presbyteries (possibly to as few as seven). This proposal was rejected by the General Assembly. However, the synods were abolished in 1993.

The following is a timeline of the mergers that took place before 2020:

=== From 1581 - 1700 ===
- In 1590, the original Presbytery of Paisley and Dumbarton was split into the presbyteries of Paisley and of Dumbarton.
- In 1597, Ellon was disjoined from Aberdeen.
- In 1609, Kelso was disjoined from parts of Duns and Jedburgh.
- In 1611, Forfar was disjoined from Meigle, Dundee, Brechin and Arbroath.
- In 1613, Selkirk was renamed Melrose and Earlston was disjoined from it.
- In 1621, Crimond was renamed as the Presbytery of Deer.
- In 1622, Stranraer was formed from part of Wigtown.
- In 1632, Aberlour was disjoined from Inveraven.
- In 1638:
  - Turriff was disjoined from Banff.
  - Cullen was renamed as the Presbytery of Fordyce.
  - Argyll was split into Dunoon, Kintyre, Inveraray and Lorn (aka Kilmore).
  - From part of Dumfries, three new presbyteries were formed: Lochmaben, Middlebie and Penpont.
- In 1640, Melrose was renamed to its original name, Selkirk.
- In 1643, Biggar was formed from parts of Peebles and Lanark.

=== 1700 - 1800 ===
- In 1724:
  - Long Island, covering Lewis to Barra, was severed from Skye.
  - Garioch was erected; most of its parishes were from Dingwall but one was from Lorn.
  - Abertarff was erected.
- In 1726:
  - Mull was severed from Lorn.
  - Tongue was erected from parts of Caithness and Dornoch.
- In 1742, Long Island was split into Lewis and Uist .
- In 1743, Langholm was formed from part of Middlebie (and the parish of Castleton from Jedburgh) and the remainder of Middlebie was renamed Annan.
- From 1768 until 1876 Earlston was named Lauder.
- Nairn was erected in 1773 from parts of Forres and Inverness.
- Garioch was renamed Lochcarron in 1775.

=== 1800 - 1900 ===
- In 1830 Burravoe was disjoined from the original Presbytery of Lerwick.
- In 1834 Greenock was disjoined from Paisley.
- In 1836:
  - Islay & Jura was severed from Kintyre.
  - Weem was disjoined from Dunkeld.
- In 1848, Olnafirth was disjoined from Lerwick and Burravoe.
- In 1856, Kinross was formed from parts of the original Presbyteries of Dunfermline, Kirkcaldy, Perth and Auchterarder.

=== 1900 - 2000 ===
- c. 1900, Islay & Jura was renamed Islay.
- In 1924, Abertarff was renamed Lochaber and some parishes moved to Inverness.
- In 1929:
  - Lerwick, Burrovoe and Olnafirth presbyteries united to form Shetland. (thus reflecting the original 1581 boundaries).
  - Dunfermline and Kinross united as the Presbytery of Dunfermline and Kinross.
  - the original Linlithgow presbytery was split into Bathgate and Linlithgow and Falkirk.
  - Biggar and Lanark were united as Lanark.
  - Dumfries and Penpont were united as the Presbytery of Dumfries.
  - Lochmaben and Annan were united as the Presbytery of Annandale.
  - Irvine was split into the presbyteries of Irvine and Kilmarnock and Ardrossan.
  - Haddington and Dunbar were united as the Presbytery of Haddington & Dunbar.
  - Duns and Chirnside were united as the Presbytery of Duns.
  - Jedburgh was divided. Part of it united with Kelso to form Jedburgh & Kelso, and part united with the whole of Langholm to form Hawick.
  - Earlston and Selkirk were united as the Presbytery of Melrose.
  - Dunkeld and Weem were (re)united as Dunkeld.
  - Stirling and Dunblane were united as Stirling & Dunblane.
  - Brechin and Fordoun were united as Brechin & Fordoun.
  - Nairn was merged into Inverness.
  - Ellon and Aberdeen merged to (again) form the Presbytery of Aberdeen.
- In 1931:
  - The Presbytery of Northern Europe was formed from the Presbytery of Italy and others under the Continental Committee but not in any Presbytery.
  - The Presbytery of Southern Europe was formed from some charges of the Presbytery of Italy and others under the Continental Committee but not in any Presbytery.
- In 1952, North of England, West of England and London were united to become the Presbytery of England.
- In 1961:
  - Dornoch and Tongue united to form Sutherland.
  - Forfar, Arbroath, Brechin & Fordoun were united as the Presbytery of Angus & Mearns.
- In 1963:
  - Lorn and Mull reunited to form Lorn & Mull.
  - Dumfries and Kirkcudbright united to form Dumfries and Kirkcudbright.
- In 1964, Bathgate was renamed Livingston and Bathgate.
- In 1967, the British Guiana was dissolved.
- In 1972, Jedburgh & Kelso and Hawick united as the Presbytery of Jedburgh.
- In 1974 the presbyteries of North Europe, South Europe, and Spain and Portugal merged to become the Presbytery of Europe.
- in 1976:
  - Livingston and Bathgate was renamed West Lothian, with some charges moved to Falkirk.
  - Linlithgow and Falkirk was renamed Falkirk, with some charges moved to West Lothian.
  - Inveraray, Islay and Kintyre united to form South Argyll.
  - Lochcarron and Skye united to form Lochcarron-Skye.
  - Dunkeld and Meigle united as the Presbytery of Dunkeld and Meigle.
  - Melrose and Peebles merged to become the Presbytery of Melrose and Peebles.
  - Perth and Auchterarder were united as the Presbytery of Perth.
  - Angus & Mearns was renamed the Presbytery of Angus, with part disjoined to the Presbytery of Kincardine and Deeside.
  - the Presbytery of Dunfermline and Kinross was renamed as Dunfermline (with six charges moving to the Presbytery of Perth).
  - the Presbyteries of Cupar and St Andrews were united as the Presbytery of St Andrews.
  - Dalkeith and Haddington & Dunbar united as the Presbytery of Lothian.
  - Deer and Turriff were united as the Presbytery of Buchan.
  - Elgin, and Strathbogie & Fordyce merged to form Moray.
- In 1977, Stirling & Dunblane was renamed the Presbytery of Stirling.
- In 1978, Annandale was renamed Annandale and Eskdale.
- In 1981, Chanonry, Dingwall and Tain united to form Ross.

=== 2000 - 2020 ===
- In 2003, Paisley and Greenock presbyteries were united (again) as Greenock and Paisley.
- In 2004, South Argyll, Lorn & Mull, and Dunoon united to form Argyll.
- In 2012 the parishes of South Uist and Barra moved to Argyll.

== Mergers from 2020 to 2024, and current presbyteries ==
From 2020 to 2024 the Church of Scotland engaged in a process of consultations with the aim of reducing the number of presbyteries to around 12. The completed mergers went as follows:

- On 1 June 2020 the presbyteries of Aberdeen and Shetland merged to form the Presbytery of Aberdeen and Shetland (with Shetland merging all of its parishes to one).
- On 1 September 2020 the presbyteries of Dumbarton, and Greenock and Paisley (itself a merger in 2003 of Greenock and Paisley presbyteries) merged becoming the Presbytery of Clyde. This reflects the original 1581 roots (at the time called Paisley and Dumbarton).
- On 1 January 2021 the presbyteries of St Andrews, Kirkcaldy, and Dunfermline merged becoming the Presbytery of Fife.
- During 2021, the western part of Moray was transferred to Inverness presbytery.
- On 1 January 2022:
  - the presbyteries of West Lothian and of Edinburgh merged to become the Presbytery of Edinburgh and West Lothian.
  - the presbyteries of Lanark and Hamilton merged to become the Presbytery of the Forth Valley and Clydesdale.
- On 1 June 2022 the Presbytery of Falkirk merged into the Presbytery of the Forth Valley and Clydesdale.
- On 30 September 2022 the presbyteries of Ardrossan; Irvine and Kilmarnock; Ayr; Wigtown and Stranraer; Annandale and Eskdale; and Dumfries and Kirkcudbright merged to become the Presbytery of the South West.
- On 1 January 2023:
  - the newly formed Presbytery of Perth united the former presbyteries of Angus, Dundee, Dunkeld and Meigle, Perth, and Stirling.
  - the presbyteries of Lothian; Melrose and Peebles; Duns; and Jedburgh merged becoming the Presbytery of Lothian and Borders.
  - the presbyteries of Aberdeen and Shetland; Buchan; Gordon; Kincardine and Deeside; Moray; and Orkney merged becoming the Presbytery of the North East and Northern Isles.
- On 1 January 2024 a new presbytery covering all of the Highlands and Hebrides (except Lewis) was created: the presbyteries of Argyll, Caithness, Sutherland, Ross, Inverness, Abernethy, Lochaber, Locharron-Skye, and Uist merged into Clèir Eilean ì (the Presbytery of the Island of Iona).

Therefore, the total number of presbyteries now stands at 14. In Scotland there are eleven: the nine marked above by bold type, plus the presbyteries of Lewis and Glasgow which as yet have been unaffected by mergers.

== Synods, presbyteries and parishes after the merger of 1929 ==
=== Synod of Aberdeen (287) ===
- Aberdeen (102): Aberdeen (50), Banchory Devenick (2), Barthol Chapel, Belhelvie (2), Blackburn, Bourtreebush, Bucksburn, Cookney, Cruden (2), Cults (2), Drumoak (2), Durris (2), Dyce (2), Echt, Ellon (2), Fintray, Foveran (2), Kinellar, Kingswells, Logie Buchan, Maryculter (2), Methlick (2), Midmar (2), Monecht, Newhills, Newmachar (2), Peterculter (2), Pitmedden, Portlethen, Rickarton, Skene (2), Slains-Forvie, Stonehaven (3), Stoneywood, Tarves, Udny
- Alford (17): Alford (2), Auchindoir (2), Corgarff, Glenbuchat (2), Keig (2), Kildrummy, Leochel-Cushnie, Lynturk, Strathdon, Tough, Towie (2), Tullynessle-Forbes
- Deer (37): Aberdour, Ardallie, Blackhill, Boddam, Crimond, Deer (3), Fraserburgh (4), Inverallochy, Kininmonth, Longside (2), Lonmay, Maud, New Deer (2), New Leeds, New Pitsligo (2), Peterhead (4), Pitsligo, Rathen (2), Rosehearty, St Fergus, Savoch (2), Strichen (2), Tyrie
- Deeside (24): Aboyne (2), Ballater (2), Banchory Ternan (2), Birse, Braemar (2), Coull, Crathie (2), Dinnet, Finzean, Kincardine O'Neil, Logie Coldstone, Lumphanan (2), Strachan (2), Tarland-Migvie, Tarland-Cromar, Torphins (2)
- Fordyce (24): Banff (2), Boyndie (2), Buckie (3), Cornhill-Ord, Cullen (2), Deskford (2), Enzie (2), Findochty, Fordyce (2), Ord, Ordiquhill, Portknockie (2), Portsoy (2), Rathven
- Garioch (30): Blairdaff, Bourtie, Chapel of Garioch (2), Cluny (2), Craigdam, Culsalmond (2), Daviot, Insch (2), Inverurie (2), Keithhall-Kinkell, Kemnay (2), Kintore (2), Leslie, Meldrum (2), Monymusk, Newseat, Oyne (2), Premnay (2), Rayne, Sclattie
- Strathbogie (32): Boharm (2), Botriphnie (2), Cabrach (2), Cairney, Clatt, Drumblade (2), Gartly (2), Glass (2), Glenrinnes, Grange (2), Huntly (2), Keith (2), Kennethmont (2), Marnoch (2), Mortlach (2), Newmill, Rhynie (2), Rothiemay (2)
- Turriff (21): Alvah, Auchterless, Forglen, Forgue (2), Fyvie (2), Gamrie, Gardenstown (2), Gordon, Inverkeithny, King Edward, Macduff (2), Millbrex, Monquhitter, New Byth, Turriff (2), Ythan Wells

=== Synod of Angus and Mearns (222) ===
- Arbroath (32): Arbirlot, Arbroath (11), Auchmithie, Barry (2), Carmyllie (2), Carnoustie (4), Colliston (2), Friockheim, Guthrie, Inverkeilor (2), Kinnell, Kirkden, Lunan, Panbride, St Vigeans
- Brechin and Fordoun (50): Arbuthnott, Benholme, Bervie (2), Brechin (7), Careston, Craig, Dun, Edzell (2), Farnell, Fern, Ferryden, Fettercairn, Fordoun (2), Garvock, Glenbervie (2), Hillside, Johnshaven, Kinneff-Caterline (2), Laurencekirk (2), Lethnot-Navar, Lochlee, Logie Pert (2), Marykirk, Maryton, Menmuir (2), Montrose (6), Muirtown-Marykirk, St Cyrus (2), Stracathro, Tarfside
- Dundee (83): Abernyte (2), Auchterhouse, Dundee (57), Inchture, Invergowrie (2), Kinnaird, Liff-Benvie, Longforgan, Lundie-Fowlis, Monifieth (4), Monikie (2), Muirhead of Liff, Murroes, Newport (2), Tayport (3), Tealing, Wormit (2)
- Forfar (22): Aberlemno, Clova, Cortachy, Dunnichen, Forfar (5), Glamisipi i, Glenprosen, Inverarity, Kinnettles, Kirriemuir (4), Letham, Memus, Oathlaw, Rescobie, Tannadice
- Meigle (35): Airlie (2), Alyth (2), Ardler, Bendochy, Blairgowrie (4), Clunie (2), Coupar Angus (2), Cray-Glenisla, Eassie-Nevay, Glenisla, Glenshee, Kettins, Kilry, Kingoldrum, Kirkmichael (2), Lethendy-Kinloch (2), Lintrathen, Meigle (2), Netherton, Newtyle (2), Persie, Rattray (2), Ruthven

=== Synod of Argyll (131) ===
- Dunoon (37): Ardentinny, Ascog, Colintraive, Dunoon (3), Innellan (2), Inverchaolain-Toward, Kames, Kilchattan Bay, Kilfinan-Kilbride, Kilmodan, Kilmun (2), Kingarth, Kirn (2), Lochgoilhead (2), North Bute, Port Bannatyne, Rothesay (8), Sandbank (2), Strachur-Strathlachlan (2), Strone, Tighnabruaich (2)
- Inveraray (15): Ardrishaig (2), Craignish, Cumlodden-Lochfyneside, Glassary, Inveraray (2), Kilmartin, Lochgilphead (2), North Knapdale (2), South Knapdale, Tarbert (2)
- Islay (8): Bowmore, Colonsay-Oronsay, Jura, Kilarrow, Kilchoman, Kildalton, Kilmeny, Portnahaven
- Kintyre (15): Campbeltown (4), Carradale-Skipness, Gigha-Cara, Kilcalmonell-Kilberry, Killean-Kilchenzie, Largieside, Lochranza (2), Saddell, Skipness, Southend (2)
- Lochaber (17): Acharacle, Ardgour, Arisaig-Moidart, Arisaig-Small Isles, Ballachulish (2), Fort Augustus (2), Fort William (2), Glengarry, Kilmallie, Kilmonivaig, Kinlochleven, Knoydart, Small Isles, Strontian
- Lorn (25): Appin (2), Ardchattan, Benderloch, Connel, Duror, Glencoe, Glenorchy-Inishail (2), Kilbrandon-Kilchattan (2), Kilchrenan-Dalavich, Kilchrenan-Portsonachan, Kilmore-Kilbride, Kilninver-Kilmelford, Lismore, Muckairn (2), Oban (4), South Ballachulish, Strathfillan (2)
- Mull (14): Ardnamurchan, Coll, Hylipol, Iona-Ross of Mull, Kilfinichen-Kilvickeon, Kilninian-Kilmore, Kinlochspelvie, Lochaline, Morvern, Salen-Ulva, Tiree, Tobermory (2), Torosay

=== Synod of Ayr (214) ===
- Ardrossan (47): Ardrossan (3), Beith (2), Brodick (2), Corrie, Dalry (4), Fairlie (2), Fergushill, Glengarnock, Kilbirnie (3), Kildonan, Kilmory-Bennecarrigan, Kilwinning (3), Lamlash (2), Largs (3), Millport (3), Saltcoats (6), Shiskine, Stevenston (3), West Kilbride (3), Whiting Bay (2)
- Ayr (75): Alloway, Annbank (2), Auchinleck (2), Ayr (12), Barr (2), Catrine (2), Coylton, Crosshill (2), Dailly (2), Dalmellington (2), Dalrymple (2), Dundonald (2), Fisherton, Girvan (4), Glenbuck, Kirkmichael, Kirkoswald (2), Lugar, Mauchline (2), Maybole (3), Monkton-Prestwick, Muirkirk (2), New Cumnock (3), Ochiltree (2), Old Cumnock (3), Patna (2), Prestwick (3), St Quivox, Schaw, Sorn, Stair, Straiton, Symington (2), Tarbolton (2), Troon (3)
- Irvine and Kilmarnock (46): Belfast-Lisburn, Craigie, Crosshouse, Darvel (3), Dreghorn-Pearston (2), Dunlop (2), Fenwick (2), Galston (3), Hurlford (2), Irvine (6), Kilmarnock (15), Kilmaurs (2), Newmilns (3), Stewarton (3)
- Stranraer (27): Ardwell, Arnsheen, Ballantrae (2), Barrhill, Colmonell, Ervie, Glenapp, Glenluce, Inch (2), Kirkcolm, Kirkmaiden (2), Leswalt, Lochryan, New Luce, Old Luce, Portpatrick (2), Sandhead, Sheuchan, Stoneykirk, Stranraer (4)
- Wigtown (19): Bargrennan, Creetown, Glasserton, Isle of Whithorn, Kirkcowan (2), Kirkinner, Kirkmabreck, Mochrum, Monigaff, Newton Stewart (2), Port William, Sorbie (2), Whithorn (2), Wigtown (2)

=== Synod of Clydesdale (648) ===
- Dumbarton (72): Alexandria (3), Arrochar (2), Baldernock, Balfron (2), Bandry, Bearsden (2), Blanefield, Bonhill (3), Boquhanran, Bowling, Buchanan, Cardross (2), Clydebank (5), Cove-Kilcreggan (2), Dalmuir (2), Dalreoch, Drumchapel, Drymen (2), Dumbarton (6), Duntocher (3), Fintry, Garelochhead, Gartocharn, Helensburgh (5), Jamestown, Kilbowie, Killearn (2), Kilmaronock, Knightswood, Luss, Milngavie (3), New Kilpatrick, Old Kilpatrick (2), Renton (3), Rhu, Rosneath (2), Shandon, Strathblane, Yoker
- Glasgow (301): Banton, Bishopbriggs (2), Busby (2), Cadder, Campsie (2), Carmunnock, Carmyle, Chryston (2), Eaglesham (2), East Kilbride (3), Giffnock (2), Glasgow (252), Greenbank, Kilsyth (3), Kirkintilloch (6), Lenzie (2), Mearns, Millerston, Netherlee, Newton Mearns, Rutherglen (7), Sandyhills, Stepps (2), Thornliebank (2), Torrance, Twechar
- Greenock (42): Gourock (3), Greenock (24), Inverkip (2), Kilmacolm (3), Langbank (2), Port Glasgow (6), Skelmorlie-Wemyss Bay (2)
- Hamilton (109): Airdrie (10), Baillieston (3), Bargeddie, Bellshill (3), Blantyre (5), Bothwell (4), Calderbank, Cambuslang (6), Chapelhall, Chapelton (2), Cleland, Coatbridge (13), Dalserf, Glasford, Glenboig, Greengairs (2), Hallside-Gilbertfield, Hamilton (11), Holytown, Kenmuir, Kirkmuirhill, Larkhall (3), Meadowfield, Motherwell (9), Newarthill, Newmains (2), New Stevenston, Overtown, Quarter, Shotts (3), Stonehouse (2), Strathaven (4), Uddingston (4), Wishaw (7)
- Lanark (63): Abington, Biggar (3), Bonkle, Braehead-Forth-Wilsontown, Carluke (3), Carmichael, Carnwath (2), Carstairs, Coalburn, Covington-Thankerton, Crawford, Crawfordjohn, Crossford, Culter, Dolphinton, Douglas (2), Douglas Water, Dunsyre, Elsrickle, Forth, Haywood, Kirkfieldbank, Lamington-Wandel, Lanark (4), Law (2), Leadhills (2), Lesmahagow (3), Libberton-Quothquan, Pettinain, Rigside, Roberton, Skirling (2), Symington (2), Walston, Wanlockhead (2), Wiston-Roberton
- Paisley (61): Barrhead (4), Bishopton (2), Bridge of Weir (3), Caldwell, Elderslie (2), Houston-Killellan (2), Howwood, Inchinnan (2), Johnstone (5), Kilbarchan (2), Levern, Linwood, Lochwinnoch (2), Neilston (2), Nitshill, Paisley (26), Renfrew (4)

=== Synod of Dumfries (119) ===
- Annan (36): Annan (4), Applegarth-Sibbaldbie, Brydekirk, Chapelknowe-Springfield, Dalton, Dornock, Eaglesfield, Ecclefechan, Eskdalemuir, Gretna (2), Half Morton, Hightae, Hoddom, Hope Memorial, Hutton-Corrie, Johnstone, Kirkmichael-Garvell, Kirkpatrick Fleming, Kirkpatrick Juxta, Kirtle, Lochmaben (2), Lockerbie (3), Middlebie, Moffat (2), St Mungo, Tundergarth, Wamphray, Waterbeck
- Dumfries (54): Caerlaverock-Glencaple, Closeburn, Colvend, Cummertrees, Dalbeattie (2), Dumfries (10), Dunscore (3), Durisdeer, Glencairn, Hardgate, Holywood, Keir, Kirkbean, Kirkconnel (2), Kirkgunzeon, Kirkmahoe, Kirkpatrick Durham (2), Kirkpatrick Irongray (2), Lochend, Lochrutton, Mainsriddell, Moniaive, Morton, Mount Kedar, Mouswald, New Abbey, Penpont, Ruthwell, Sanquhar (3), Scaurbridge-Burnhead, Southwick, Terregles, Thornhill-Virginhall, Tinwald, Torthorwald, Tynron, Urr
- Kirkcudbright (29): Anwoth, Auchencairn (2), Balmaclellan, Balmaghie, Borgue (2), Buittle, Carsphairn (2), Castle Douglas (2), Corsock (2), Crossmichael, Dalry (2), Gatehouse, Girthon, Kells, Kelton, Kirkcudbright (2), Laurieston, Parton, Rerrick, Tarff Valley, Tongland, Twynholm

=== Synod of England ===
- Liverpool and Manchester:
- West of England:

=== Synod of Fife (179) ===
- Cupar (36): Abdie, Auchtermuchty (2), Balmalcolm, Balmerino, Bow of Fife, Ceres, Collessie, Creich, Cults, Cupar (3), Dairsie, Dunbog, Edenshead, Falkland (2), Flisk, Freuchie (2), Gauldry, Kettle (2), Kilmany, Ladybank (2), Logie, Monimail, Moonzie, Newburgh (2), Rathillet, Springfield, Strathmiglo (2)
- Dunfermline and Kinross (54): Aberdour (2), Balgedie, Ballingry, Beath, Cairneyhill, Carnock, Cleish, Cowdenbeath (3), Crossgates, Culross (2), Dalgety, Dunfermline (13), Inverkeithing (2), Kelty (2), Kincardine, Kinross (2), Lassodie, Limekilns, Lochcraig, Lochgelly (3), Lumphinnans, Milnathort, Mossgreen, Newmills, North Queensferry, Orwell, Pathstruie, Portmoak, Rosyth, Saline (2), Torryburn, Tulliallan
- Kirkcaldy (55): Auchterderran, Auchtertool, Buckhaven (4), Burntisland (2), Cardenden, Denbeath, Dysart (2), East Wemyss, Innerleven, Kennoway (2), Kinghorn (2), Kinglassie, Kirkcaldy (17), Leslie (3), Leven (2), Markinch (3), Methil (2), Methilhill, Milton of Balgonie, Prinlaws, Scoonie, Thornton (2), Wemyss, West Wemyss, Windygates
- St Andrews (34): Anstruther, Anstruther Easter, Anstruther Wester, Boarhills, Cameron, Carnbee, Cellardyke, Colinsburgh, Crail (2), Dunino, Elie (2), Forgan, Kemback, Kilconquhar, Kilrenny, Kingsbarns, Largo (2), Largoward, Lathones, Leuchars (2), Newburn, Pittenweem (2), St Andrews (4), St Monance (2), Strathkinness

=== Synod of Glenelg ===
- Lewis: Barvas, Knock, Lochs, Stornoway, Uig
- Lochcarron: Applecross, Gairloch, Glenelg, Glenshiel, Kintail, Knoydart, Lochalsh, Lochbroom, Lochcarron, Poolewe, Shieldaig, Ullapool
- Skye: Bracadale, Duirinish, Kilmuir, Portree, Sleat, Small Isles, Snizort, Stenscholl, Strath
- Uist: Barra, Bernera, Harris, North Uist, South Uist, Trumisgarry

=== Synod of Lothian and Tweeddale (351) ===
- Bathgate (28): Armadale (2), Avonbridge, Bathgate (3), Blackburn, Blackridge, Broxburn (3), Caldercruix (2), Ecclesmachan, Fauldhouse (2), Harthill (2), Livingston (2), Longridge-Breich, Longriggend, Torphichen (2), Uphall (2), Whitburn (2)
- Dalkeith (40): Bonnyrigg, Borthwick, Carlops, Carrington, Cockpen, Cranstoun, Crichton, Dalkeith (4), Fala-Soutra (2), Ford, Glencorse, Gorebridge (2), Heriot, Howgate, Inveresk, Lasswade (2), Loanhead (2), Musselburgh (5), Newbattle, Newton, Newtongrange, Penicuik (3), Rosewell, Roslin (2), Temple (2)
- Edinburgh (160): Addiewell, Balerno, Cobbinshaw, Currie, East Calder, Edinburgh (147), Kirknewton, Mid Calder (2), Ratho, Stoneyburn, West Calder (2), Wilkieston
- Haddington and Dunbar (43): Aberlady, Athelstaneford, Belhaven, Bolton-Saltoun, Cockburnspath (2), Cockenzie (2), Dirleton (2), Dunbar (2), Garvald, Gladsmuir, Gullane (2), Haddington (3), Humbie, Innerwick, Longniddry, Morham, North Berwick (3), Oldhamstocks, Ormiston (2), Pencaitland (2), Prestonkirk (2), Prestonpans (2), Spott, Stenton, Tranent (3), Whitekirk-Tyninghame, Whittingehame, Yester
- Linlithgow and Falkirk (61): Abercorn (2), Airth (2), Blackbraes, Bo'ness (2), Bonnybridge, Bothkennar-Carronshore, Carriden, Carron, Condorrat, Cumbernauld (2), Dalmeny, Denny (4), Dennyloanhead, Falkirk (14), Grangemouth (6), Haggs, High Bonnybridge, Kirkliston, Larbert (3), Linlithgow (3), Muiravonside, Newliston, Pardovan-Kingscavil, Polmont (2), Queensferry (2), Shieldhill, Slamannan (2), Stenhouse, Winchburgh
- Peebles (19): Blythbridge, Broughton-Glenholm-Kilbucho, Drumelzier, Eddleston, Innerleithen (2), Kirkurd, Lyne-Megget, Manor, Newlands, Peebles (3), Stobo, Traquair, Tweedsmuir, Walkerburn, West Linton (2)

=== Synod of Merse and Teviotdale (146) ===
- Duns (40): Abbey St Bathans-Cranshaws, Allanton, Ayton (2), Bunkle-Preston, Burnmouth, Chirnside (2), Coldingham (2), Duns (4), Edrom, Eyemouth (2), Fogo, Foulden-Mordington, Gordon (2), Grantshouse, Greenlaw (2), Houndwood, Hutton-Fishwick, Ladykirk, Langton (2), Longformacus (2), Paxton, Polwarth, Reston, St Abbs, Swinton (2), Westruther (2), Whitsome
- Hawick (36): Ashkirk, Canonbie (2), Castleton, Cavers, Denholm, Edgerston, Ewes, Hawick (12), Hobkirk, Holywell, Kirkton, Langholm (3), Longtown, Minto, Newcastleton (2), Roberton, Saughtree, Southdean, Teviothead, Westerkirk, Wolflee
- Jedburgh and Kelso (34): Ancrum (2), Bedrule, Coldstream (3), Crailing (2), Eccles, Eckford, Ednam, Hownam, Jedburgh (3), Kelso (5), Leitholm, Linton, Makerstoun (2), Morebattle (2), Oxnam, Roxburgh, Smailholm, Sprouston, Stichill (2), Yetholm (2)
- Melrose (36): Bowden, Caddonfoot, Channelkirk, Earlston (2), Ettrick (2), Galashiels (8), Kirkhope, Lauder (2), Legerwood, Lilliesleaf, Maxton, Melrose (3), Mertoun, Newtown, St Boswells (2), Selkirk (4), Stow (2), Yarrow (2)

=== Synod of Moray (107) ===
- Abernethy (24): Abernethy-Boat of Garden, Abernethy-Kincardine, Advie, Alvie, Carrbridge, Craggan, Cromdale (2), Duthil, Glenlivet, Grantown, Insh, Inverallan, Inveravon, Kincraig, Kingussie (2), Kirkmichael (2), Laggan (2), Rothiemurchus-Aviemore (2), Tomintoul
- Elgin (43): Aberlour (2), Alves (2), Archiestown, Bellie, Birnie, Burghead, Dallas (2), Drainie, Duffus, Dyke (2), Edinkillie (2), Elchies, Elgin (4), Findhorn, Fochabers, Forres (3), Garmouth, Hopeman, Kinloss, Knockando, Lossiemouth (2), Moyness, Pluscarden, Rafford (2), Rothes (2), St Andrews-Lhanbryde, Speymouth, Spynie, Urquhart (2)
- Inverness (40): Ardclach (2), Ardersier (2), Auldearn, Boleskine, Bona, Cawdor (2), Croy (2), Dalmore, Daviot-Dunlichity, Dores, Erchless, Glenmoriston, Inverness (10), Kilmichael, Kilmore, Kiltarlity (2), Kirkhill (2), Moy-Dalarossie-Tomatin, Nairn (3), Petty (2), Stratherrick, Strathglass

=== Synod of Perth and Stirling (189) ===
- Auchterarder (28): Aberuthven, Ardoch, Auchterarder (3), Blackford (2), Braco-Greenloaning, Comrie (2), Creiff (4), Dundurn, Dunning (2), Fowlis Wester, Gask, Glendevon, Madderty-Kinkell (2), Monzie (2), Monzievaird-Strowan, Muthill (2), Trinity Gask
- Dunkeld (28): Aberfeldy (2), Amulree, Ardeonaig, Blair Atholl (2), Braes of Rannoch, Dalguise-Strathbraan, Dull, Dunkeld-Dowally (2), Fortingall (2), Foss, Glenlyon, Grantully, Kenmore (2), Kinloch Rannoch (2), Lawers, Little Dunkeld, Logierait, Moulin-Pitlochry (2), Strathtay, Tenandry, Weem
- Perth (62): Aberdalgie-Dupplin, Abernethy (2), Almondbank, Arngask, Auchtergaven (2), Balbeggie-Kinrossie, Bridge of Earn, Burrelton, Caputh, Cargill, Collace, Craigend, Dron, Dunbarney, Errol (2), Forgandenny (2), Forteviot, Glendoick-Pitroddie, Glenfarg, Kilspindie-Rait, Kinclaven (2), Kinfauns, Logiealmond (2), Luncarty, Methven (2), Moneydie, Murthly, Perth (17), Redgorton, Rhynd, St Madoes, St Martin's, Scone (3), Stanley (2), Tibbermore, Wolfhill
- Stirling and Dunblane (71): Aberfoyle, Alloa (5), Alva (3), Balquhidder, Bannockburn (3), Blairingone, Blairlogie, Bridge of Allan (3), Bridge of Teith, Buchlyvie (2), Callander (2), Cambusbarron, Clackmannan (3), Coalsnaughton, Cowie, Dollar (2), Dunblane (3), Fossoway (2), Gargunnock, Gartmore (2), Killin (2), Kilmadock (2), Kincardine in Menteith, Kippen (2), Lecropt, Lochearnhead, Logie, Menstrie, Muckhart, Norrieston, Plean, Port of Menteith, Sauchie, Stirling (12), Tillicoultry (2), Trossachs, Tullibody

=== Synod of Ross, Sutherland and Caithness (167) ===
- Caithness (33): Barrock, Berriedale, Bower (2), Bruan, Canisbay (2), Dunbeath, Dunnet, Halkirk (2), Keiss (2), Latheron (2), Lybster (2), Olrig (2), Reay, Shebster, Shurrery, Thurso (3), Watten (2), Westerdale-Halsary, Wick (5)
- Chanonry and Dingwall (30): Alness, Avoch (2), Carnoch-Strathconon, Contin, Cromarty (2), Dingwall (2), Dundonnell, Ferintosh-Maryburgh, Fodderty, Fortrose (2), Killearnan, Kilmorack (2), Kiltearn, Kinlochluichart-Strathgarve, Knockbain (2), Lochbroom, Redcastle, Resolis, Rosemarkie, Strathpeffer, Ullapool, Urquhart, Urray (2)
- Dornoch (19): Assynt (2), Brora, Clyne, Creich (2), Dornoch (2), Golspie (2), Helmsdale (2), Kildonan-Loth, Lairg (2), Rogart (2), Rosehall, Stoer
- Lewis (14): Barvas (2), Carloway, Cross, Kinloch, Knock, Lochs-Bernera, Lochs-Crossbost, Ness, Stornoway (3), Uig (2)
- Lochcarron (15): Applecross, Aultbea, Gairloch, Glenelg (2), Glenshiel, Kintail, Lochalsh, Lochcarron (2), Plockton (2), Poolewe, Shieldaig, Torridon-Kinlochewe
- Skye (10): Bracadale, Duirinish, Kilmuir, Portree (2), Sleat, Snizort (2), Strath, Waternish
- Tain (20): Croick, Edderton (2), Fearn (2), Invergordon, Kilmuir Easter (2), Kincardine (2), Logie Easter (2), Nigg (2), Rosskeen (2), Tain (2), Tarbat (2)
- Tongue (13): Altnaharra, Durness (2), Eddrachillis (2), Farr (2), Kinlochbervie, Melness-Eribol, Strathy (2), Tongue (2)
- Uist (13): Barra, Benbecula, Bernera (2), Carinish, Daliburgh, Kilmuir, Manish, Paible, Scarista, South Uist, Tarbert, Trumisgarry

Synod of the Scottish Church in England

- London: London (4)
- North of England: Berwick (2), Lowick, Newcastle
- West of England: Carlisle, Liverpool

=== Presbyteries not in a Synod but possessed of Synodical powers (81) ===
- Orkney (51): Birsay (2), Burray (2), Deerness (2), Eday (2), Evie (2), Firth (2), Flotta, Harray (2), Holm (3), Hoy-Graemsay, Kirkwall (3), North Ronaldsay, Orphir (2), Papa Westray, Rendall, Rousay (2), St Andrews (2), Sanday (4), Sandwick (2), Shapinsay (2), South Ronaldsay (3), Stenness, Stromness (3), Stronsay (2), Walls, Westray (2)
- Shetland (30): Brae-Olnafirth, Bressay, Burra Isles, Clousta-Aith, Cunningsburgh, Dunrossness, Fetlar (2), Hillswick, Lerwick (3), Mid Yell, Mossbank-Firth, Nesting, North Yell, Quarff, Sandsting-Aithsting, Sandwick (2), Scatsta, South Yell, Tingwall, Unst (2), Uyeasound, Walls, Weisdale, Whalsay, Whiteness

== Synods, presbyteries and parishes before the merger of 1929 ==
From the Fasti Ecclesiae Scoticanae.

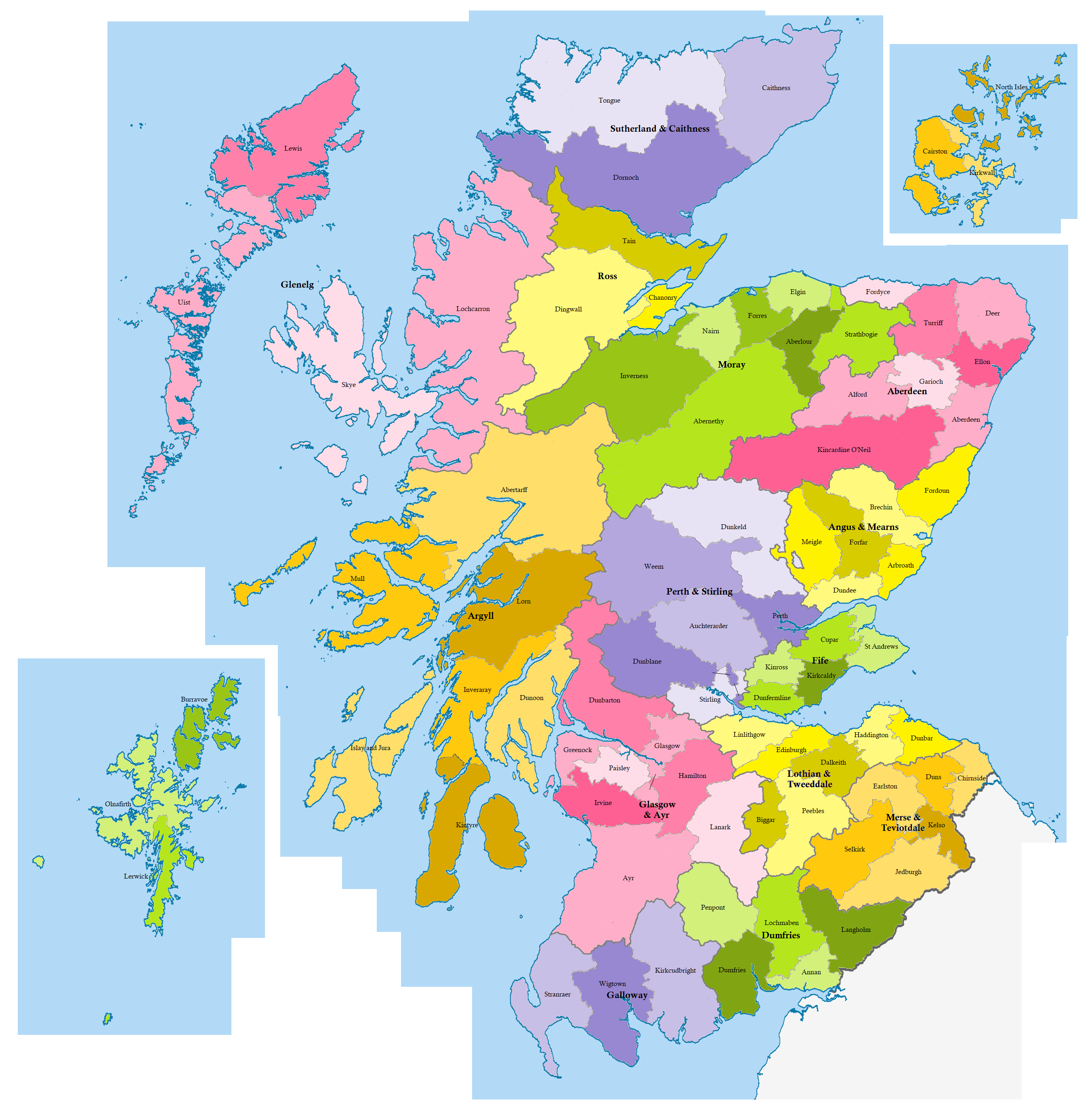
Presbyteries pre-1929

=== Synod of Aberdeen ===
- Aberdeen: Banchory Devenick, Belhelvie, Drumoak, Durris, Dyce, East, Fintray, Greyfriars, Kinellar, Maryculter, New Machar, Newhills, Nigg, North, Peterculter, St Clement's, St Machar's, St Nicholas', Skene, South
- Alford: Alford, Auchindoir-Kearn, Cabrach, Clatt, Glenbuchat, Keig, Kennethmont, Kildrummy, Leochel Cushnie, Strathdon, Tough, Towie, Tullynessle-Forbes
- Deer: Aberdour, Crimond, Fraserburgh, Longside, Lonmay, New Deer, Old Deer, Peterhead, Pitsligo, Rathen, St Fergus, Strichen, Tyrie
- Ellon: Cruden, Ellon, Foveran, Logie Buchan, Methlick, Slains, Tarves, Udny
- Fordyce: Banff, Boyndie, Cullen, Deskford, Fordyce, Ordiquhill, Rathven
- Garioch: Bourtie, Chapel of Garioch, Culsalmond, Daviot, Insch, Inverurie, Keithhall-Kinkell, Kemnay, Kintore, Leslie, Meldrum, Monymusk, Oyne, Premnay, Rayne
- Kincardine O'Neil: Aboyne-Glentanar, Banchory Ternan, Birse, Cluny, Coull, Crathie, Echt, Glenmuick, Kincardine O'Neil, Logie Coldstone, Lumphanan, Midmar, Strachan, Tarland
- Turriff: Alvah, Auchterless, Forglen, Forgue, Fyvie, Gamrie, Inverkeithny, King Edward, Monquhitter, Turriff

=== Synod of Angus and Mearns ===
- Arbroath (south-eastern Forfarshire): Arbirlot, Arbroath, Barry, Carmylie, Guthrie, Inverkeilor, Kinnell, Kirkden, Lunan, Panbride, St Vigeans
- Brechin (north-eastern Forfarshire): Brechin, Careston, Craig, Dun, Edzell, Farnell, Fern, Lethnot-Navar, Lochlee, Logie Pert, Maryton, Menmuir, Montrose, Stracathro
- Dundee (southern Forfarshire and far eastern Perthshire): Abernyte, Auchterhouse, St Clement's, St David's, St John's, St Mary's, St Paul's, Inchture, Kinnaird, Liff-Benvie, Longforgan, Lundie, Mains-Strathmartine, Monifieth, Monikie, Murroes, Tealing
- Fordoun (southern and central Kincardineshire): Arbuthnott, Benholme, Bervie, Dunnottar, Fettercairn, Fetteresso, Fordoun, Garvock, Glenbervie, Kinneff-Catterline, Laurencekirk, Marykirk, St Cyrus
- Forfar (central Forfarshire): Aberlemno, Cortachy-Clova, Dunnichen, Forfar, Glamis, Inverarity, Kinnettles, Kirriemuir, Oathlaw, Rescobie, Tannadice
- Meigle (western Forfarshire and far north-eastern Perthshire): Airlie, Alyth, Bendochy, Blairgowrie, Coupar Angus, Eassie-Nevay, Glenisla, Kettins, Kingoldrum, Lintrathen, Meigle, Newtyle, Ruthven

=== Synod of Argyll ===
- Abertarff (northern Argyllshire and southern Inverness-shire): Ardgour, Arisaig (in Mull until 1920), Ballachulish, Fort Augustus, Glengarry, Kilmallie, Kilmonivaig, Strontian
- Dunoon (south-eastern Argyllshire): Dunoon, Inverchaolain, Kilfinan, Kilmodan, Kingarth, Lochgoilhead-Kilmorich, North Bute, Rothesay, Strachur-Strathlachlan
- Islay and Jura (south-western Argyllshire) (all parishes in Kintyre until 1836): Colonsay, Jura, Kilarrow, Kilchoman, Kildalton
- Inveraray (south-central Argyllshire): Craignish, Glassary, Inveraray, Kilmartin, North Knapdale, South Knapdale, Tarbert
- Kintyre (southern Argyllshire and southern Buteshire): Campbeltown, Gigha, Kilbride, Kilcalmonell-Kilberry, Killean-Kilchenzie, Kilmorie, Saddell, Southend
- Lorn (north-eastern Argyllshire): Ardchattan-Muckairn, Glenorchy-Inishail, Kilbrandon-Kilchattan, Kilchrenan-Dalavich, Kilmore-Kilbride, Kilninver-Kilmelford, Lismore-Appin
- Mull (north-western Argyllshire): Ardnamurchan, Coll, Kilfinichen-Kilvickeon, Kilninian-Kilmore, Morvern, Tiree, Torosay

=== Synod of Dumfries ===
- Annan (11) (southern Dumfriesshire): Annan, Brydekirk, Cummertrees, Dornock, Greenknowe, Gretna, Hoddom, Kirkpatrick Fleming, Kirtle, Middlebie, Ruthwell
- Dumfries (south-western Dumfriesshire and eastern Kirkcudbrightshire): Caerlaverock, Colvend, Dumfries, Dunscore, Greyfriars, Holywood, Kirkbean, Kirkgunzeon, Kirkmahoe, Kirkpatrick Durham, Kirkpatrick Irongray, Lochrutton, New Abbey, Terregles, Tinwald, Torthorwald, Troqueer, Urr
- Langholm (8) (eastern Dumfriesshire, plus one parish from Roxburghshire): Canonbie, Castleton, Eskdalemuir, Ewes, Half Morton, Langholm, Saughtree, Westerkirk
- Lochmaben (13) (central Dumfriesshire): Applegarth, Dalton, Dryfesdale, Hutton-Corrie, Johnstone, Kirkmichael, Kirkpatrick Juxta, Lochmaben, Moffat, Mouswald, St Mungo, Tundergarth, Wamphray
- Penpont (north-western Dumfriesshire): Closeburn, Durisdeer, Glencairn, Keir, Kirkconnel, Morton, Penpont, Sanquhar, Tynron

=== Synod of Fife ===
- Cupar: Abdie, Auchtermuchty, Balmerino, Ceres, Collessie, Creich, Cults, Cupar, Dairsie, Dunbog, Falkland, Flisk, Kettle, Kilmany, Logie, Monimail, Moonzie, Newburgh, Strathmiglo
- Dunfermline: Aberdour, Beath, Carnock, Culross, Dalgety, Dunfermline, Inverkeithing, Saline, Torryburn
- Kinross (created 1856, taking Cleish, Kinross and Orwell from Dunfermline, Fossoway and Muckhart from Auchterarder, Arngask from Perth, and Ballingry and Portmoak from Kirkcaldy): Arngask, Ballingry, Cleish, Fossoway, Kinross, Muckhart, Orwell, Portmoak
- Kirkcaldy: Abbotshall, Auchterderran, Auchtertool, Burntisland, Dysart, Kennoway, Kinghorn, Kinglassie, Kirkcaldy, Leslie, Markinch, Scoonie, Wemyss
- St Andrews: Abercrombie, Anstruther Easter, Anstruther Wester, Cameron, Carnbee, Crail, Dunino, Elie, Ferryport on Craig, Forgan, Kemback, Kilconquhar, Kilrenny, Kingsbarns, Largo, Leuchars, Newburn, Pittenweem, St Andrews

=== Synod of Galloway ===
- Kirkcudbright (central Kirkcudbrightshire): Anwoth, Balmaclellan, Balmaghie, Borgue, Buittle, Carsphairn, Corsock, Crossmichael, Dalry, Girthon, Kells, Kelton, Kirkcudbright, Parton, Rerrick, Tongland, Twynholm
- Stranraer (western Wigtownshire, plus two parishes from Ayrshire): Ballantrae, Colmonell, Inch, Kirkcolm, Kirkmaiden, Leswalt, New Luce, Old Luce, Portpatrick, Stoneykirk, Stranraer
- Wigtown (eastern Wigtownshire and western Kirkcudbrightshire): Glasserton, Kirkcowan, Kirkinner, Kirkmabreck, Mochrum, Monigaff, Penninghame, Sorbie, Whithorn, Wigtown

=== Synod of Glasgow and Ayr ===
- Ayr (southern Ayrshire): Auchinleck, Ayr, Barr, Coylton, Craigie, Dailly, Dalmellington, Dalrymple, Dundonald, Galston, Girvan, Kirkmichael, Kirkoswald, Mauchline, Maybole, Monkton-Prestwick, Muirkirk, New Cumnock, Newton-upon-Ayr, Ochiltree, Old Cumnock, Riccarton, St Quivox, Sorn, Stair, Straiton, Symington, Tarbolton
- Dunbarton (Dunbartonshire and western Stirlingshire): Arrochar, Baldernock, Balfron, Bonhill, Buchanan, Cardross, Drymen, Dunbarton, Fintry, Killearn, Kilmaronock, Luss, New Kilpatrick, Old Kilpatrick, Rosneath, Row, Strathblane, Strathfillan (in Weem until 1900)
- Glasgow (north-western Lanarkshire, plus two parishes from Stirlingshire, two from Dunbartonshire and one from Renfrewshire): Barony, Blackfriars, Cadder, Calton, Campsie, Carmunnock, Cathcart, Cumbernauld, Eaglesham, Gorbals, Govan, Kilsyth, Kirkintilloch, Maryhill, Rutherglen, St Andrew's, St David's, St Enoch's, St George's, St James's, St John's, St Mungo's, St Paul's, Shettleston, Springburn, Tron
- Greenock (north-western Renfrewshire, plus two parishes from Ayrshire) (all in Paisley until 1834 except Cumbrae and Largs, which were in Irvine): Cumbrae, East, Erskine, Inverkip, Kilmacolm, Middle, Largs, Port Glasgow, West
- Hamilton (central Lanarkshire): Avendale, Blantyre, Bothwell, Cambuslang, Cambusnethan, Dalserf, Dalziel, East Kilbride, Glasford, Hamilton, New Monkland, Old Monkland, Shotts, Stonehouse
- Irvine (northern Ayrshire): Ardrossan, Beith, Dalry, Dreghorn, Dunlop, Fenwick, High, Irvine, Kilbirnie, Kilmarnock, Kilmaurs, Kilwinning, Loudoun, Stevenston, Stewarton, West Kilbride
- Lanark (south-eastern Lanarkshire): Carluke, Carmichael, Carnwath, Carstairs, Crawford, Crawfordjohn, Douglas, Lanark, Lesmahagow, Pettinain, Wiston-Roberton
- Paisley (south-eastern Renfrewshire): Abbey, Eastwood, High, Houston-Killellan, Inchinnan, Kilbarchan, Laigh, Lochwinnoch, Mearns, Middle, Neilston, Renfrew

=== Synod of Glenelg ===
- Lewis: Barvas, Lochs, Stornoway, Uig
- Lochcarron: Applecross, Gairloch, Glenelg, Glenshiel, Kintail, Lochalsh, Lochbroom, Lochcarron
- Skye: Bracadale, Duirinish, Kilmuir, Portree, Sleat, Small Isles, Snizort, Strath
- Uist: Barra, Harris, North Uist, South Uist

=== Synod of Lothian and Tweeddale (166) ===
- Biggar (11) (eastern Lanarkshire, plus two parishes from Peeblesshire): Biggar, Broughton-Glenholm-Kilbucho, Coulter, Covington, Dolphinton, Dunsyre (in Lanark until 1765), Lamington-Wandel, Libberton, Skirling, Symington, Walston
- Dalkeith (23) (eastern Edinburghshire, plus one parish from Haddingtonshire): Borthwick, Carrington, Cockpen, Cranstoun, Crichton, Dalkeith (x2), Fala-Soutra, Glencorse, Heriot, Inveresk, Lasswade, Loanhead, Newbattle, Newcraighall, Newton, Northesk, Ormiston, Penicuik, Rosewell, Roslin, Stobhill, Temple
- Dunbar (10) (eastern Haddingtonshire, plus one parish from Berwickshire): Belhaven, Cockburnspath, Dunbar, Innerwick, Oldhamstocks, Prestonkirk, Spott, Stenton, Whitekirk-Tyninghame, Whittingehame
- Edinburgh (68) (western Edinburghshire): Addiewell, Blackhall, Colinton, Corstorphine (x2), Craiglockhart, Cramond, Currie, Duddingston, Edinburgh (x44), Gilmerton, Granton, Juniper Green, Kirknewton, Leith (x6), Liberton, Mid Calder (in Linlithgow until 1884), Portobello, Ratho, West Calder (in Linlithgow until 1884)
- Haddington (16) (western Haddingtonshire): Aberlady, Athelstaneford, Bolton-Saltoun, Cockenzie, Dirleton, Garvald-Bara, Gladsmuir, Gullane, Haddington, Humbie, Morham, North Berwick, Pencaitland, Prestonpans, Tranent, Yester
- Linlithgow (26) (Linlithgowshire, plus south-eastern Stirlingshire): Abercorn, Armadale, Bathgate, Bo'ness, Broxburn, Camelon, Carriden, Dalmeny, Ecclesmachan, Falkirk (x2), Fauldhouse, Grahamston, Grangemouth, Kerse, Kirkliston, Linlithgow, Livingston, Muiravonside, Polmont, Queensferry, Slamannan, Torphichen, Uphall, Whitburn, Winchburgh
- Peebles (12) (Peeblesshire): Drumelzier, Eddleston, Innerleithen, Kirkurd, Lyne-Megget, Manor, Newlands, Peebles, Stobo, Traquair, Tweedsmuir, West Linton

=== Synod of Merse and Teviotdale (75) ===
- Chirnside (13) (eastern Berwickshire): Ayton, Chirnside, Coldingham, Coldstream, Edrom, Eyemouth, Foulden, Houndwood, Hutton-Fishwick, Ladykirk, Mordington, Swinton, Whitsome
- Duns (9) (central Berwickshire): Abbey St Bathans-Cranshaws, Bunkle-Preston, Duns, Eccles, Fogo, Greenlaw, Langton, Longformacus, Polwarth
- Earlston (9) (western Berwickshire, plus one parish from Edinburghshire and one from Roxburghshire): Channelkirk, Earlston, Gordon, Lauder, Legerwood, Mertoun, Smailholm, Stow, Westruther
- Jedburgh (19) (central Roxburghshire): Ancrum, Bedrule, Cavers, Crailing, Eckford, Edgerston, Hawick (x4), Hobkirk, Hownam, Jedburgh, Kirkton, Minto, Oxnam, Southdean, Teviothead, Wilton
- Kelso (11) (eastern Roxburghshire, plus one and a half parishes from Berwickshire): Ednam, Kelso (x2), Linton, Makerstoun, Morebattle, Nenthorn, Roxburgh, Sprouston, Stichill-Hume, Yetholm
- Selkirk (16) (Selkirkshire and north-western Roxburghshire): Ashkirk, Bowden, Caddonfoot, Ettrick-Buccleuch, Galashiels (x3), Kirkhope, Lilliesleaf, Maxton, Melrose, Roberton, St Boswells, Selkirk (x2), Yarrow

=== Synod of Moray ===
- Aberlour: Aberlour, Boharm, Inveravon, Knockando, Rothes
- Abernethy: Abernethy-Kincardine, Alvie, Cromdale, Duthil, Kingussie, Kirkmichael, Laggan (in Abertarff until 1890)
- Elgin: Alves, Birnie, Drainie, Duffus, Elgin, St Andrews Lhanbryd, Speymouth, Spynie, Urquhart
- Forres: Dallas, Dyke, Edinkillie, Forres, Kinloss, Rafford
- Inverness: Boleskine (in Abertarff until 1920), Daviot-Dunlichity, Dores, Inverness-Bona, Kiltarlity-Convinth, Kirkhill, Moy-Dalarossie, Petty, Urquhart (in Abertarff until 1884)
- Nairn (mostly in Forres until 1773): Ardclach, Ardersier (in Chanonry until 1773), Auldearn, Cawdor, Croy (in Inverness until 1773), Nairn
- Strathbogie: Bellie, Botriphnie, Cairnie, Drumblade (in Turriff until 1898), Gartly, Glass, Grange, Huntly, Keith, Marnoch, Mortlach, Rhynie, Rothiemay

=== Synod of Orkney ===
- Cairston: Birsay, Firth, Harray, Hoy, Orphir, Sandwick, Stenness, Stromness, Walls
- Kirkwall: Evie, Holm, Kirkwall-St Ola, St Andrews, St Peter's (South Ronaldsay)
- North Isles: Cross-Burness, Lady, Rousay, Shapinsay, Stronsay, Westray

=== Synod of Perth and Stirling ===
- Auchterarder: Ardoch, Auchterarder, Blackford, Comrie, Crieff, Dunning, Findo Gask, Fowlis Wester, Glendevon, Madderty, Monzie, Monzievaird-Strowan, Muthill, Trinity Gask
- Dunblane: Aberfoyle, Balquhidder, Buchlyvie, Callander, Dunblane, Gartmore, Kilmadock, Kincardine in Menteith, Kippen, Lecropt, Logie Wallach, Port of Menteith, Tillicoultry, Tulliallan
- Dunkeld: Auchtergaven, Blair Atholl, Caputh, Cargill, Clunie, Dunkeld-Dowally, Kinclaven, Kirkmichael in Strathardail, Lethendy, Little Dunkeld, Moulin, Rattray, Tenandry
- Perth: Aberdalgie, Abernethy, Collace, Dron, Dunbarney, Errol, Forgandenny, Forteviot, Kilspindie, Kinfauns, Kinnoull, Logiealmond, Methven, Moneydie (in Dunkeld until 1758), Redgorton, Rhynd, St John's, St Madoes, St Mark's, St Martins, St Paul's, Scone, Stanley, Tibbermore
- Stirling: Airth, Alloa, Alva, Bothkennar, Clackmannan, Denny, Dollar, Gargunnock, Larbert-Dunipace, St Ninians, Stirling
- Weem (all parishes in Dunkeld until 1836): Amulree, Dull, Fortingall, Grantully, Kenmore, Killin, Logierait, Weem

=== Synod of Ross ===
- Chanonry: Avoch, Cromarty, Killearnan, Knockbain, Resolis, Rosemarkie
- Dingwall: Alness, Contin, Dingwall, Fodderty, Kilmorack, Kiltearn, Urquhart-Logie Wester, Urray
- Tain: Edderton, Fearn, Kilmuir Easter, Kincardine, Logie Easter, Nigg, Rosskeen, Tain, Tarbat

=== Synod of Shetland (all in Synod of Orkney until 1830) ===
- Burravoe (all parishes in Lerwick until 1830): Fetlar, Mid Yell, Unst
- Lerwick: Bressay, Dunrossness, Lerwick, Tingwall
- Olnafirth: Delting, Nesting, Northmavine (these in Burravoe until 1848), Sandsting, Walls (these in Lerwick until 1848)

=== Synod of Sutherland and Caithness ===
- Caithness: Bower, Canisbay, Dunnet, Halkirk, Latheron, Olrig, Reay, Thurso, Watten, Wick
- Dornoch: Assynt, Clyne, Creich, Dornoch, Golspie, Kildonan, Lairg, Loth, Rogart
- Tongue: Durness, Eddrachillis, Farr, Tongue

== Dioceses, deaneries and parishes in the medieval period ==
From the Scottish Place-Name Society.

=== Diocese of Aberdeen ===
- Aberdeen: Aberdeen Snow, Aberdeen St Machar, Aberdeen St Nicholas, Aberdeen Spittal, Banchory Devenick, Banchory Ternan, Belhelvie, Maryculter, Peterculter
- Boyne: Aberdour, Alvah, Banff, Cullen, Deskford, Fordyce, Forglen, Gamrie, Inverboyndie (St Brendan), Kinedward, Montbrey, Rathven, Turriff, Tyrie
- Buchan: Bethelnie, Crimond, Cruden, Deer, Ellon, Fetterangus, Forvie, Foveran, Fyvie, Inverugie, Logie Buchan, Lonmay, Methlick, Peterugie, Philorth, Rathen, Slains, Tarves
- Garioch: Auchterless, Bourtie, Culsalmond, Dalmayock, Daviot, Drumblade, Dyce, Fintray, Forgue, Insch, Inverurie, Kemnay, Kennethmont, Kinellar, Kinkell, Kintore, Leslie, Logie Durno, Monkeggie, Oyne, Premnay, Rathmureal, Rayne, Skene, Tullynessle
- Marr: Abergairn, Aboyne, Alford, Auchindoir, Birse, Cabrach, Clatt, Cluny, Coldstone, Coull, Crathie, Cushnie, Dumeath, Echt, Fetternear, Forbes, Glenbuchat, Glenmuick, Glentanar, Invernochty, Kearn, Keig, Kildrummy, Kinairney?, Kinbathoch, Kincardine O'Neil, Kindrochit, Leochel, Logie Mar, Lumphanan, Midmar, Migvie (St Finan), Monymusk, Mortlach, Tarland (St Mo-Luoc of Lismore), Tough, Tullich

=== Diocese of Argyll ===
- Glassary: Craignish (joint with Lorn), Dunoon (St Mary), Inverchaolain, Kilfinan, Kilmaglass, Kilmalduff, Kilmartin (joint with Lorn), Kilmichael Glassary, Kilmodan, Kilmorich (-C15th), Kilmun, Lochgoilhead (Three Holy Brethren), Strathlachlan
- Kintyre: Kilberry, Kilblane, Kilchalmonell, Kilchenzie, Kilchousland, Kilcolmkill (Kintyre), Kilkerran, Kilkivan, Killarrow, Killean (Kintyre), Kilmacocharmik, Kilmichael
- Lorn: Ardchattan (St Baodan), Craignish (joint with Glassary), Glenorchy, Inishail, Kilbrandon, Kilbride, Kilchattan, Kilchrenan, Killespick-Kyril, Kilmartin (joint with Glassary), Kilmelfort, Kilmore, Kilninver, Lismore
- Morvern: Ardnamurchan (St Comgan), Arisaig, Eilean Fhianain, Eilean Munde, Glenelg, Kilcolmkill (Morvern), Killintag, Kilmallie, Kilmonivaig, Knoydart (St Comgan), Moidart

=== Diocese of Brechin ===
- Brechin, Burghill, Catterline, Cortachy, Dundee, Dunnichen, Dysart (Angus), Ecclesjohn, Farnell, Finaven, Glenbervie, Glenisla, Guthrie, Kilmuir (Brechin), Kingoldrum, Kirkbuddo, Lethnot, Lochlee, Monikie, Montrose, Navar, Old Montrose, Panbride, Stracathro, Strachan

=== Diocese of Caithness ===
- Assynt, Bower, Cannisbay, Clyne, Creich, Dornoch, Dunbeath, Dunnet, Durness, Farr, Halkirk, Kildonan, Kilmalie, Lairg, Latheron, Loth, Olrig, Reay, Rogart, Skinnet, Thurso, Watten, Wick

=== Diocese of Dunblane ===
- Aberfoyle, Abernethy, Aberuthven, Auchterarder, Balquhidder, Callander, Comrie, Culross, Dron, Dunblane, Dunning, Dupplin, Exmagirdle, Findo Gask, Fossoway, Fowlis Wester, Glendevon, Kilbride (Dunblane), Kilmadock (St Cadog of Llancarfan), Kilmahog (St Mahan), Kincardine in Menteith, Kinkell, Kippen, Lecropt, Leny, Logie (Stirling), Monzie, Monzievaird, Muthill, Port of Menteith, St Madoes (St Cadog of Llancarfan), Strageith, Strowan, Tillicoultry, Trinity Gask, Tulliallan, Tullibody, Tullibole, Tullicheddill

=== Diocese of Dunkeld ===
- Angus: Abernyte, Alyth, Auchterhouse, Bendochy, Cambusmichael, Caputh, Cargill, Clunie, Coupar, Fern, Kinclaven, Lethendy, Logiebride, Luncarty, Lundeiff, Megginch, Meigle, Menmuir, Rattray, Redgorton, Ruthven, Tealing
- Atholl and Drumalban: Ardeonaig, Auchtergaven, Blair Atholl, Dowally, Dull, Fortingall, Inchcaiden, Killin, Kilmaveonaig (St Beoghand?), Kirkmichael, Lagganallachy, Logierait, Lude, Moneydie, Moulin, Obney, Rannoch, Strathfillan, Struan, Weem
- Dunkeld: Dunkeld Holy Trinity, Dunkeld St Columba, Little Dunkeld
- Fife and Strathearn: Abercrombie, Aberdalgie, Aberdour, Alva, Auchtertool, Beath, Crieff, Dalgety, Dollar, Fettykil, Forgandenny, Lecropt, Madderty, Muckersie, Rosyth, Saline, Strathmiglo, Tibbermore
- Lothian: Abercorn (St Serf), Aberlady (unknown), Bunkle (unknown), Cramond (St Columba), Preston (unknown)
- Killespick-Kyril

=== Diocese of Galloway ===
- Desnes: Anwoth, Balnacross, Borgue (St Nicholas), Buittle, Crossmichael, Dunrod (SS Mary & Brioc), Galtway, Gelston (St Michael), Girthon, Kelton, Kirkandrews, Kirkchrist, Kirkcormack, Kirkcudbright, Kirkdale, Kirkmabreck, Minnigaff, Rerrick, Senwick, Tongland, Twynholm
- Farines: Cruggleton, Glasserton, Glenluce (St Michael), Kirkcowan, Kirkinner, Kirkmadrine, Longcastle, Mochrum, Penninghame, Sorbie St Fillan, Sorbie St Michael, Whithorn, Wigtown
- Glenkens: Balmaclellan, Balmaghie, Dalry, Kells, Parton
- Rhinns: Clayshant, Inch, Kirkcolm, Kirkmaiden (St Medana or Mo-Etain), Leswalt, Soulseat, Stoneykirk, Toskertoun

=== Diocese of Glasgow ===
- Annandale: Annan (unknown), Applegarth (St Nicholas?), Brydekirk (St Bride), Carruthers (unknown), Castlemilk (St Mungo), Corrie (unknown), Cummertrees (unknown), Dalton (unknown), Dalton Parva (unknown), Dornock (St Marjory), Dryfesdale (St Cuthbert), Ecclefechan (St Fechan of Fore), Gretna (unknown), Hoddom (unknown), Hutton (unknown), Irving?, Johnstone (unknown), Kirkconnel (St Conal), Kirkconnell (St Convallus or Conal), Kirkpatrick Fleming (St Patrick), Kirkpatrick Juxta (St Patrick), Lochmaben (St Mary Magdalene), Luce (unknown), Middlebie (unknown), Moffat (St Mary), Mouswald (St Peter), Pennersaughs (unknown), Rinpatrick (St Patrick), Ruthwell (St Cuthbert), Sibbaldbie (unknown), Trailtrow (unknown), Tundergarth (unknown), Wamphray (St Cuthbert)
- Carrick: Colmonell, Dailly, Girvan, Kirkbride (Carrick), Kirkcudbright Innertig, Kirkmichael (Carrick), Kirkoswald, Maybole, Straiton
- Desnes: Colmonell, Colvend, Kinderloch, Kirkbean, Kirkbride (Urr), Kirkgunzeon (St Findbarr of Moyville), Kirkpatrick Durham, Kirkpatrick Irongray, Lochrutton, Southwick, Terregles, Troqueer (St Convellus or Connall), Urr (St Constantine)
- Eskdale: Canonbie (St Martin), Kirkandrews-on-Esk* (St Andrew), Netherkirk of Ewes (St Cuthbert), Overkirk of Ewes (St Mark), Staplegorton (unknown), Wauchope (unknown), Westerkirk (unknown)
- Kyle and Cunninghame: Ardrossan, Auchinleck, Ayr, Barnweil (Holy Rood), Beith, Coylton, Craigie, Cumbrae (St Kenneth?), Cumnock, Dalmellington, Dalry (St Margaret), Dalrymple, Dreghorn, Dundonald, Dunlop, Galston, Irvine, Kilbirnie, Kilmarnock, Kilmaurs, Kilwinning, Largs, Loudoun, Mauchline, Monkton, Ochiltree, Pierston, Prestwick, Riccarton, St Quivox, Stevenson, Stewarton, Symington (Ayrshire), Tarbolton, West Kilbride
- Lanark: Biggar (St Nicholas), Carluke, Carmichael, Carnwath, Carstairs, Covington (St Michael), Crawford, Crawfordjohn, Culter (St Michael), Dolphinton (unknown), Douglas, Dunsyre (St Bride), East Kilbride, Lamington (St Ninian), Lanark, Lesmahagow, Libberton (unknown), Nemphlar, Pettinain, Quothquan (unknown), Roberton, Stonehouse, Symington (unknown), Thankerton (St John the Evangelist), Walston (unknown), Wandel (unknown), Wiston
- Lennox: Antermony, Baldernock, Balfron, Bonhill, Campsie, Cardross, Drymen, Dumbarton, Fintry, Inchcailleach, Killearn, Kilmaronock, Kilpatrick, Lenzie (St Ninian), Luss, Monyabroch, Rosneath (St Nicholas), Strathblane
- Nithsdale: Caerlaverock, Closeburn, Dalgarnock, Dumfries, Dumgree (unknown), Dunscore, Durisdeer, Garvald (unknown), Glencairn, Holywood, Kirkbride (Durisdeer), Kirkmahoe, Kirkmichael (St Michael), Morton (unknown), Penpont, Sanquhar, Tinwald, Torthorwald, Trailflat, Tynron
- Peebles: Broughton (St Muireach), Drumelzier (unknown), Eddleston (St Barr), Ettrick (St Mary), Glenholm (St Cuthbert), Innerleithen (St Mungo), Kailzie (St Mary), Kilbucho (St Bega), Kirkbride (St Bride), Kirkurd (St Constantine), Linton (unknown), Lyne (unknown), Manor (St Gordian), Newlands (unknown), Peebles (St Andrew), Skirling (St Mary), Stobo (St Mungo), Yarrow (St Mary)
- Rutherglen: Blantyre, Bothwell, Cadder, Cadzow (St Mary?), Cambuslang, Cambusnethan, Carmunnock, Cathcart, Dalziel, Eaglesham, Eastwood (St Convallus or Connall), Erskine, Glasgow, Glassford, Govan, Houston, Inchinnan, Inverkip, Kilbarchan, Killellan, Kilmacolm, Lochwinnoch, Mearns, Monkland, Neilston, Paisley, Pollok, Renfrew, Rutherglen, Shotts (St Catherine), Strathavon, Torrance
- Teviotdale: Ancrum (unknown), Ashkirk (St Ninian), Bedrule (unknown), Belkirk?, Bolside?, Bowden (St Bathan), Castleton (unknown), Cavers Magna (unknown), Cavers Parva (unknown), Crailing (unknown), Eckford (unknown), Ettiltoun (unknown), Hassendean (St Mungo), Hawick (St Mary), Hobkirk (unknown), Hownam (unknown), Jedburgh (St Mary), Kelso (St Mary), Lempitlaw (unknown), Lessudden (St Mary), Lilliesleaf (unknown), Lindean (unknown), Linton (unknown), Longnewton (unknown), Maxton (St Cuthbert), Maxwell (St Michael), Melrose (St Cuthbert), Minto (unknown), Morebattle (St Lawrence), Mow (St Helen?), Nisbet (unknown), Old Roxburgh (Holy Sepulchre), Oxnam (unknown), Rankilburn (unknown), Roxburgh St James (St James), Roxburgh Holy Sepulchre?, Rule Hervey (unknown), Rutherford?, Selkirk Abbatis (St Mary), Selkirk Regis?, Southdean (unknown), Sprouston (St Michael), Wheelkirk (unknown), Wilton (unknown), Yetholm (unknown)

=== Diocese of the Isles ===
- Barra, Barvas, Benbecula, Bracadale, Canna, Coll, Colonsay-Oronsay, Duirinish, Eye, Gigha-Cara, Harris, Howmore, Inchkenneth, Iona, Kilbride (Arran), Kilchoman, Kilcolmkill (Mull), Kildalton, Kildonan, Kilfinichen, Killarrow, Killean (Mull), Killearnadale, Kilmaluag, Kilmaluoc, Kilmory (Arran), Kilmuir (North Uist), Kilmuir (Duirinish), Kilninian, Kilpeter, Kilvickeon, Kingarth, Kirkapol, Lochs, Minginish, Ness, Rodel, Rothesay, Sand, Sleat, Snizort, Sorobie, Strath, Trumpan, Uig (Lewis), Uig (Skye)

=== Diocese of Moray ===
- Elgin: Altyre, Alves, Ardclach, Auldearn, Bellie, Birnie, Dallas, Dipple, Duffus, Dundurcus, Dyke, Edinkillie, Elchies, Elgin, Essil, Forres, Invernairn, Kinnedar (St Gervadius or Gerardine), Kintray, Knockando, Lhanbryd, Moy, Ogston (St Peter), Pluscarden, Rafford, Rothes, St Andrews, Spynie, Urquhart
- Inverness: Abertarff, Abriachan, Barevan (St Eibhinn), Boleskine, Brackley, Convinth, Croy, Dalarossie, Dalcross, Daviot, Dores, Dunlichity, Farnua, Inverness, Kilravock, Kiltarlity, Kirkhill, Lunan, Petty, Urquhart, Wardlaw
- Strathbogie: Aberlour, Arndilly, Botarie, Botriphnie, Drumdelgie, Dunbennan, Edindivach, Essie, Gartly, Glass, Inverkeithny, Keith, Kinnoir, Marnoch, Rhynie, Rothiemay, Ruthven
- Strathspey: Abernethy, Advie, Alvie, Cromdale, Duthil, Insh, Inverallan, Inveravon, Kincardine, Kingussie, Kirkmichael, Laggan, Rothiemurchus

=== Diocese of Orkney ===
- Aithsting, Baliasta, Birsay, Bressay, Burness, Burra, Burray, Cross, Cunningsburgh, Deerness, Delting, Dunrossness, Eday, Egilsay, Evie, Fair Isle, Fetlar, Firth, Flotta, Foula, Graemsay, Harray, Hillswick, Holm, Hoy, Lady (Sanday), Lady (Stronsay), Laxavoe, Lund, Lunnasting, Nesting, North Ronaldsay, Northmavine, Northrew, Norwick, Ollaberry, Olnafirth, Orphir, Papa Stour, Papa Westray, Quarff, Rendall, Rousay, St Andrews, St Mary's (South Ronaldsay), St Nicholas (Stronsay), St Peter's (South Ronaldsay), St Peter's (Stronsay), Sandness, Sandsting, Sandwick, Shapinsay, Stenness, Stromness, Tingwall, Walls (Orkney), Walls (Shetland), Weisdale, Westray, Whalsay, Whiteness, Yell

=== Diocese of Ross ===
- Alness, Applecross, Ardersier, Avoch, Contin, Cromarty, Cullicudden, Dingwall, Edderton, Ederdour (St Itharnan), Fodderty, Gairloch, Kilmorack, Kilmuir Easter, Kilmuir Wester, Kiltearn (St Tighernach?), Kincardine, Kinnettes, Kintail, Kirkmichael, Lemlair (St Bride), Lochalsh (St Comgan), Lochbroom, Lochcarron, Logie Easter, Logie Wester, Nigg, Nonakiln, Rosemarkie, Rosskeen, Suddie, Tain, Tarbat, Tarradale, Urquhart, Urray

=== Diocese of St Andrews ===
- Angus: Aberlemno, Airlie, Arbirlot, Auldbar, Ballumby, Barry, Cookston, Dalbog, Dun, Dunlappie, Dunninald, Eassie, Edzell, Ethie, Glamis, Idvies, Inchbrayock, Inverarity, Invergowrie, Inverkeilor, Inverlunan, Kettins, Kinnell, Kinnettles, Kirriemuir, Liff, Lintrathen, Logie Dundee, Logie Montrose, Lundie, Mains, Meathie-Lour, Monifieth, Murroes, Nevay, Newtyle, Pert, Rescobie, Restenneth, St Vigeans, Strathmartine, Tannadice
- Fife: Abercrombie, Abdie (St Adrian), Anstruther (St Nicholas), Balmerino, Ceres, Collessie (St Andrew), Crail, Creich, Cupar, Dairsie, Dunbog, Dunino, Flisk (St Adrian or Magridin), Forgan (St Fillan), Kellie, Kemback, Kennoway, Kilconquhar, Kilmany, Kilrenny, Largo, Leuchars, Logie, Monimail, Moonzie, Newburn, St Andrews, St Leonards, Scoonie (St Memma), Tarvit
- Fothriff: Arngask, Auchterderran (St Modach?), Auchtermuchty (St Serf), Ballingry, Carnock, Clackmannan, Cleish, Cults, Dunfermline, Dysart, Inverkeithing, Kilgour (St Gabrien?), Kinghorn, Kinglassie, Kinross, Kirkcaldy, Kirkforthar, Lathrisk, Markinch (St Drostan), Methil, Muckhart, Portmoak, Torryburn, Wemyss
- Gowrie: Benvie, Blairgowrie, Cambusmichael, Collace, Dunbarney, Errol, Forteviot, Fowlis Easter, Inchture, Kilspindie, Kinfauns, Kinnaird, Kinnoull, Kirkpottie, Longforgan, Luncarty, Methven, Moncrieffe, Perth, Rait, Rhynd, Rossie, Scone
- Haddington: Athelstaneford (unknown), Auldhame (St Baldred), Bara (unknown), Bass (St Baldred), Bolton (unknown), Bothans (St Cuthbert), Carrington (unknown), Clerkington (unknown), Cockpen (unknown), Cranstoun (unknown), Crichton (unknown), Dunbar (St Beya), Fala (St Modan), Garvald (unknown), Gullane (St Andrew), Haddington St Mary (St Mary), Haddington St Martin? (St Martin), Hamer (St Mary of Fairknowe), Harvieston, Heriot (St Mary), Humbie (unknown), Innerwick (St Michael), Inveresk (St Michael), Keith Marischal (unknown), Linton (St Baldred), Lochorworth (St Mungo), Moorfoot (unknown), Morham (unknown), North Berwick (St Andrew), Oldhamstocks (unknown), Ormiston (St Giles), Pencaitland (unknown), Pitcox (Holy Rood?), Saltoun (St Michael), Seton (Holy Rood), Soutra (Holy Trinity), Spott (St John?), Tranent (unknown), Tyninghame (St Baldred), Whittingehame (unknown)
- Linlithgow: Airth, Auldcathie (unknown), Bathgate (unknown), Binny (St Giles), Bothkennar (St Cainer), Calder Clere (St Cuthbert), Calder Comitis (St John), Cambuskenneth, Canongate (unknown), Carriden (unknown), Corstorphine (St John the Baptist), Dalkeith (St Nicholas), Dalmeny (St Cuthbert), Denny, Dunipace, Ecclesmachan (St Machan), Edinburgh (St Giles), Edinburgh Castle? (unknown), Falkirk (St Modan), Gargunnock, Gogar (unknown), Hailes (St Cuthbert), Killeith (St Mungo), Kinneil (St Katherine), Kirkliston (unknown), Kirknewton (unknown), Larbert, Lasswade (St Edwin), Liberton (St Mary), Linlithgow (St Michael), Livingston (unknown), Melville (St Andrew), Newton (St Mary), Penicuik (St Mungo), Pentland (unknown), Ratho (St Mary), Restalrig (St Triduana?), Roslin? (St Matthew), St Cuthbert's (St Cuthbert), St Ninians, Slamannan (St Lawrence), Stirling, Strathbrock (St Nicholas), Torphichen (unknown), Traverlen (unknown), Woomet (unknown)
- Lothian: Masterton?, Mount Lothian (St Mary), Newbattle (St Mary), Temple (unknown)
- Mearns: Aberlethnott, Arbuthnott, Benholm, Convinth, Dunottar, Durris, Fettercairn, Fetteresso, Fordoun, Garvock, Inverbervie, Kinneff, Newdosk, Nigg (St Fiachra), St Cyrus (St Cyricus or Curig)
- Merse: Abbey St Bathans (St Bathan), Ayton (St Dionysius), Bassendean (St Mary), Berwick Holy Trinity, Berwick St Laurence, Berwick St Mary, Bondington, Channelkirk (St Cuthbert), Chirnside (unknown), Coldingham (St Mary), Cranshaws (St Ninian), Duns (unknown), Easter Upsetlington (unknown), Earlston (unknown), Eccles (St Cuthbert), Ednam (St Cuthbert), Edrom (St Mary), Ellem (unknown), Fishwick (unknown), Fogo (unknown), Foulden (unknown), Gordon (St Michael), Greenlaw (unknown), Halliburton, Hilton (unknown), Hirsel?, Horndean (unknown), Hume (St Nicholas), Hutton (unknown), Lamberton (St Lambert), Langton (St Cuthbert), Lauder (St Mary), Legerwood (unknown), Lennel (unknown), Longformacus (unknown), Makerstoun (unknown), Mertoun (St Ninian), Mordington (St Mary?), Nenthorn (unknown), Newton Don?, Oldcambus (St Helen), Paxton?, Polwarth (St Mungo), Simprin (unknown), Smailholm (unknown), Stichill (St Nicholas), Stow (St Mary), Strafontain (St Fintan), Swinton (unknown), Wester Upsetlington?, Whitsome (unknown)

== See also ==
- List of Church of Scotland parishes
