= Temple, Midlothian =

Coordinates: 55.817°N 3.093°W

Temple: Scottish Gaelic: Baile nan Trodach
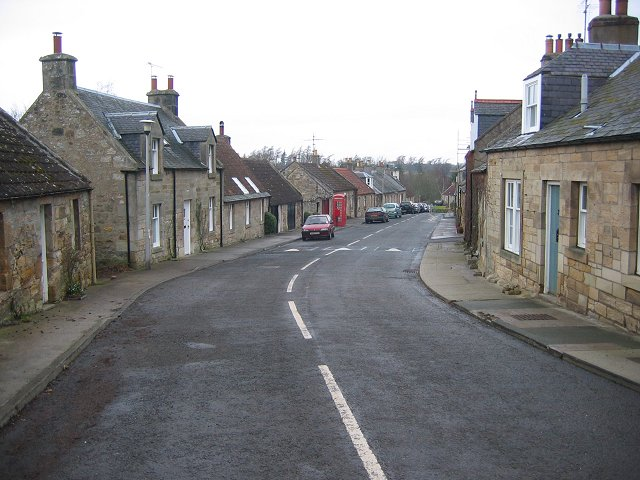
- Looking northwards down the village street

- Location within Midlothian
- OS grid reference: NT315587
- Council area: Midlothian
- Lieutenancy area: Midlothian
- Country: Scotland
- Sovereign state: United Kingdom
- Post town: GOREBRIDGE
- Postcode district: EH23
- Dialling code: 01875
- Police: Scotland
- Fire: Scottish
- Ambulance: Scottish
- UK Parliament: Midlothian
- Scottish Parliament: Midlothian South, Tweeddale and Lauderdale

Temple (Scottish Gaelic: Baile nan Trodach) is a village and civil parish in Midlothian, Scotland. Situated to the south of Edinburgh, the village lies on the east bank of the river South Esk.

The civil parish has a population of 225 (in 2011).

== Name ==
The name "Temple" refers to its historical connection to the Knights Templar. In 1237, the town name was recorded as "Ballentrodoch", from the Scottish Gaelic Baile nan Trodach, which means "town of the warriors", again a reference to the Knights Templar.

== History ==
=== Pre-Reformation ===
Historically the Parish of Temple was divided into three portions, the ancient parish of Clerkington, and the chapelries of Moorfoot and Balantrodach. Clerkington was a parsonage held by the monks of Newbattle Abbey, Moorfoot was a chapelry founded by monks from the same institution. Balantrodach on the other hand, was a chapelry of the Knights Templar.

==== Knights Templar ====
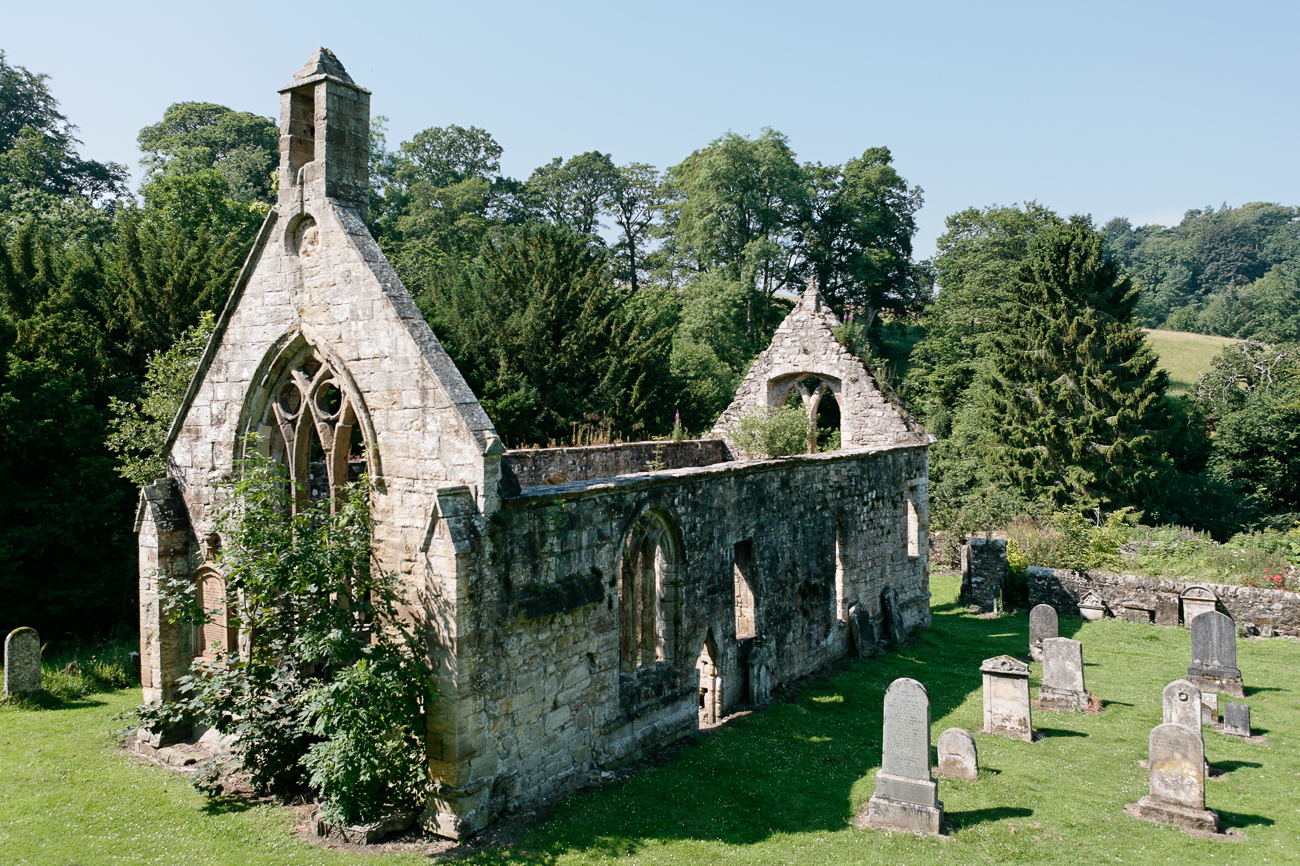
Temple Church Temple Midlothian

In 1128, Hugues de Payens, the first Grand Master, met with David I in Scotland and was granted the lands of Balantrodach. In 1128, the Council of Troyes formally recognized the Order. Balantrodach became their principal Templar seat and preceptory in Scotland until the suppression of the order between 1307 and 1312. As Temple, being just to the south of the Firth of Forth, was an area of the country occupied by England at this time, knights were prosecuted, but not all were found guilty. Nearby to the north, politics was even more on their side – Robert the Bruce had been excommunicated, and so was not required to follow papal commands, and at war with England, it has been suggested that he may have been welcoming to powerful and desperate allies.

Following 1312 and the Papal bull (edict) entitled Ad providam, King Edward II of England abolished the Templars in both England and Scotland. According to the edict, all Knight Templar property was to be seized and handed over to the control of the Knights Hospitaller, who had a preceptory at Torphichen in West Lothian. Although he was located in Scotia, north of the Firth of Forth, Robert the Bruce, being under interdict at the time, was reluctant to do so.

Many Templar Knights may have assimilated within the Hospitallers. But it's not necessarily the case that the Templars everywhere immediately ceased to be. Indeed, North of the Firth, in Scotland the Order combined with the Hospitallers and continued as The Order of St John and the Temple until the reformation.

"Legend has it that treasure of the Knights Templar was removed secretly from Paris, to be hidden in Temple. A local legend states: 'Twixt the oak and the elm tree/You will find buried the millions free.' French legends about the Templar treasure apparently also state that the treasure was taken to Scotland, with the knights landing on the Isle of May, the first island they would encounter in the Firth of Forth. Geographically, this would take them to the mouth of the river Esk, which could take them on to Rosslyn..."

=== Post-Reformation ===
Following the Reformation, the present parish was formed from the three older divisions. In 1618, it took its name Temple from the preceptory chapel which had by then become the parish kirk.

In the following centuries, Temple became a bustling agricultural village, but in recent years it has become a dormitory village for nearby Edinburgh. The current Church was funded by Thomas Creak whose family were leading figures in Temple in the 1820/30s and earlier. The family owned two houses in Temple but also owned a large farming property in Eccles, Berwickshire.

== Mansion houses ==
Temple has two large houses in the vicinity:

- Arniston House (built between 1726 and 1750), designed by William Adam and completed by his son, John Adam, built for Robert Dundas, of Arniston, the elder, Lord President of the Court of Session
- Rosebery House (built c. 1805), for Archibald Primrose, 4th Earl of Rosebery

== Notable residents ==
- Andrew Young (1885–1971), minister of Temple Kirk and Makar
- Sir William Gillies (1898–1973), landscape painter
