= St Mungo, Dumfries and Galloway =

Civil parish in Dumfries and Galloway, Scotland

Coordinates: 55.0679°N 3.3686°W

St Mungo
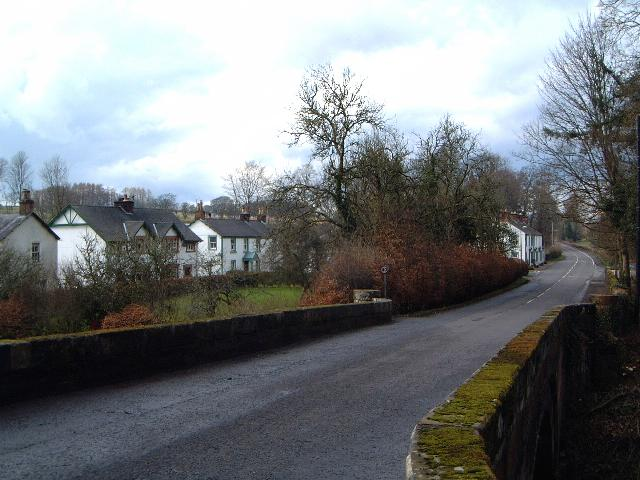
- Kettleholm village in the parish seen from the bridge over the Water of Milk

- Location within Dumfries and Galloway
- Area: 220.1 km^{2} (85.0 sq mi)
- Civil parish: St Mungo
- Council area: Dumfries and Galloway
- Country: Scotland
- Sovereign state: United Kingdom
- Police: Scotland
- Fire: Scottish
- Ambulance: Scottish

St Mungo is a civil parish in Dumfries and Galloway located to the south of Lockerbie. Kettleholm is a small village in the parish and the village has a public hall which in the past has organised a Christmas fayre.

The Water of Milk river runs through St Mungo and the River Annan borders the parish to the south. The main road through St Mungo is the B723 and the A74(M) lies to the east.

== History ==
The parish is medieval in origin, with the Old St Mungo's Parish Church recorded as belonging to the Bishop of Glasgow in 1174. The name of the parish dates to the 17th century when the parish adopted the name of the saint Saint Mungo.

The Old St Mungo's Parish Church was extensively remodelled in 1741 and was used until the 1840ss when it was replaced with a newer parish church, built 1843 near Kettleholm. This church was converted to the primary school in the 1870s and another replacement church, the current St Mungo Parish Church built in 1863. Ruins of the original old church remain, as does an extensive cemetery with 17th and 18th century headstones.

== Notable buildings ==
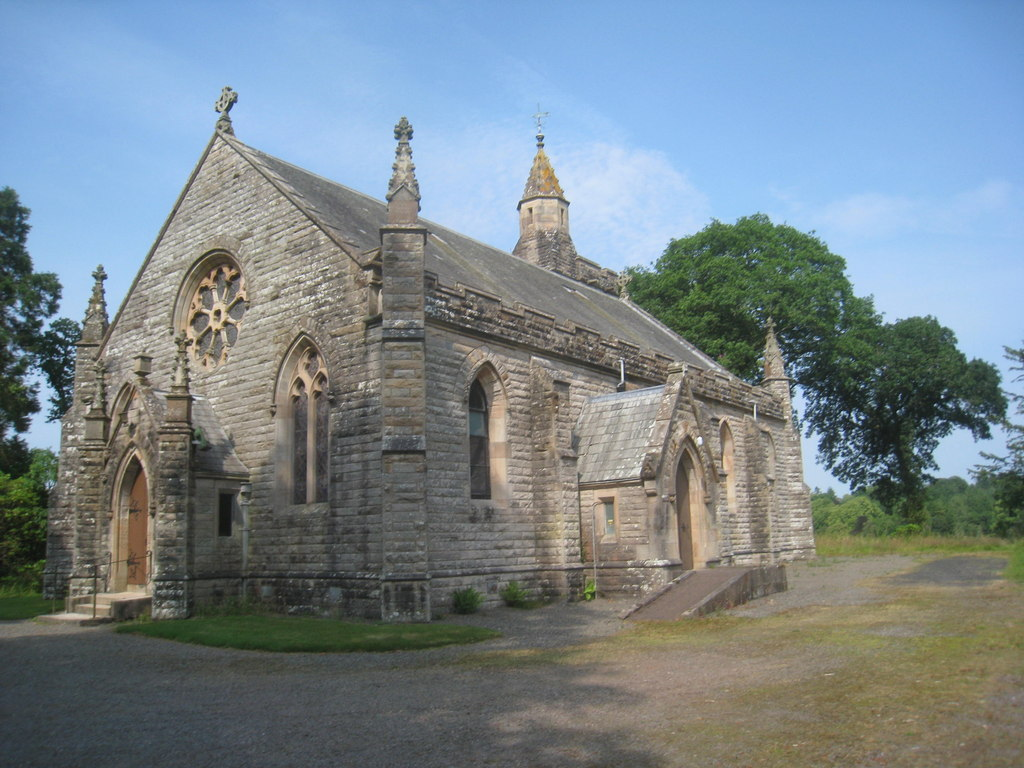
The parish church of St Mungo

St Mungo Parish Church is a Category B listed church in the parish. It was designed by David Bryce in 1877 in the Scots Gothic style. The church closed for services in December 2022.

Castlemilk is a 19th-century country house in the parish, also designed by David Bryce, in 1863. A former owner of the house was Major R. Buchanan Jardine, M.C. and the house served as a hospital during the First World War.

== Education ==
St Mungo Primary is a primary school in the parish currently partnered with Hightae Primary. The school is located in a former church, built 1843.
