= Presbytery of Lewis =

One of the twelve principal presbyteries of the Church of Scotland

The Presbytery of Lewis is one of the twelve principal presbyteries of the Church of Scotland (analogous to a diocese in Episcopal denominations).

Despite many efforts in the first two centuries after the formation of the Church of Scotland, it was not until the 18th century that efficient church government began in Lewis. Under King James IV, a company of persons termed 'undertakers' were sent to Lewis to found a church court in 1598. This proved unsuccessful, with many dying in the process. It was tried again in 1601, which was also unsuccessful. In 1610, The minister of Gairloch, Farquhar McRae, was sent to Lewis since, it was claimed, 'its inhabitants were strangers to the Gospel'.

In 1724 the General Assembly severed the entire district of the Outer Islands (from Lewis in the North to Barra in the South) from the Presbytery of Skye. The presbytery of Lewis was created in 1742 by the division of the Presbytery of Long Island [also called Innis Fada] (which covered the whole of the Outer Hebrides) into the Presbyteries of Lewis and Uist.

Prior to 1724 the Outer Hebrides were part of the Presbytery of Skye. It was formerly part of the Synod of Glenelg. This later became the Synod of Ross, Sutherland and Caithness (until its dissolution on 1 January 1993).

It was invited to join the new Presbytery of the Highlands and Islands in 2024 but deferred its decision to join.

== Parishes ==
Much of the information below is taken from the Church of Scotland Yearbook 2025–2026.

Parish(es)	Population	Former parishes	Buildings	Founded	Minister(s)	Membership
Barvas	1,988		Barvas	Medieval	Vacant	72
Carloway	946	Carloway, Shawbost	Carloway (Callanish)		Duncan M. MacAskill (2019–)	45
Cross Ness	1,256		Cross		Vacant	56
Kinloch	918	Park	Laxay		Iain M. Campbell (2008–)	31
Knock	2,258		Knock (Garrabost)	1829^{TC}	Guardianship Donald W. MacDonald [OLM] (2025–)	24
Lochs-Crossbost	892		Lochs-Crossbost (Liurbost)	Medieval	Guardianship	6
Lochs-In-Bernera l/w Uig	252		Lochs-in-Bernera (Breacleit)		Hugh Maurice Stewart (2008–)	28
Lochs-In-Bernera l/w Uig	397		Uig (Miavaig)	Medieval	Hugh Maurice Stewart (2008–)	17
Stornoway: High	10,751		Stornoway High (orig. Free Church)	1845 (1909)	Gordon Macleod (2019–)	92
Stornoway: Martin's Memorial	10,751		Martin's Memorial, Stornoway (orig. Free English Church)	1875 (1878)	Tommy MacNeil (2006–)Brian Macleod [Assistant] (2025–)	345
Stornoway: St Columba's	10,751	Gress	St Columba's, Stornoway	1794	William Heenan (2012–)	118

== Congregational history ==
- Barvas Parish Church (1933–)
  - Barvas Parish Church (1857–1933), formerly Barvas and Ness Parish Church (C16th-1857), formerly St Mary's Parish Church, Barvas (ancient-C16th)
  - Barvas United Free Church (1900–33), formerly Barvas Free Church (1845–1900)
- Carloway Parish Church (1929–), formerly Carloway United Free Church (1900–29), formerly Carloway and Callernish Free Church (1844–1900)
- Cross Ness Parish Church (1976–), formerly Cross Parish Church (1935–76)
  - Cross Parish Church (1857–1935), formerly Ness Parliamentary Chapel (1828–57), formerly St Peter's Parish Church, Ness (ancient-C16th)
  - Ness Parish Church (1929–35), formerly Cross United Free Church (1900–29), formerly Cross Free Church (1843–1900)
- Kinloch Parish Church (1995–)
  - Kinloch Parish Church (1929–95), formerly Kinloch United Free Church (1900–29), formerly Kinloch Free Church (1885–1900)
  - Park Parish Church (1965–95), formerly Park Church Extension Charge (1963–65)
- Knock Parish Church (1929–)
  - Knock Parish Church (1857–1929), formerly Ey Parliamentary Chapel (1828–57), formerly St Columba's Parish Church, Ey (ancient-C16th)
  - Knock United Free Church (1900–29), formerly Knock Free Church (1843–1900)
- Lochs Crossbost Parish Church (1929–), formerly Lochs United Free Church (1900–29), formerly Lochs Free Church (1843–1900)
- Lochs in Bernera Parish Church (1929–), formerly Lochs Parish Church (1722–1929), formerly St Columba's Parish Church, Lochs (ancient-C16th)
- Stornoway High Parish Church (1929–), formerly Stornoway High United Free Church (1900–29), formerly Stornoway Free Church (1844–1900)
- Stornoway Martin's Memorial Parish Church (1929–), formerly Stornoway English United Free Church (1913–29)
  - Stornoway English United Free Church (1900–13), formerly Stornoway English Free Church (1876–1900)
  - Stornoway James Street United Free Church (1900–13), formerly Stornoway United Presbyterian Church (1858–1900)
- Stornoway St Columba's Parish Church (1929–), formerly Stornoway Parish Church (−1929), formerly Stornoway, Gress and Ey Parish Church (1722–1857), formerly Stornoway, Gress, Ey, Lochs and Uig Parish Church (C16th-1722)
  - St Adamnan's Parish Church, Stornoway (ancient-C16th)
  - St Olaf's Parish Church, Gress (ancient-C16th)
- Uig Parish Church (1979–)
  - Uig Baile-na-cille Parish Church (1929–79), formerly Uig Parish Church (1722–1929), formerly St Coman's Parish Church, Uig (ancient-C16th)
  - Uig Uigen Parish Church (1929–79), formerly Uig United Free Church (1900–29), formerly Uig Free Church (1843–1900)

== Ministers ==
Barvas:

1. fl. 1566: Patrick Martin
2. fl. 1642: Murdoch McHuiston
3. 1643-1670s: Donald Morrison
4. 1670s–1699: Donald Morrison II
5. 1692–1723: Alan Morrison
6. 1726–1767: Murdoch Morrison
7. 1767–1789: Alexander MacKay
8. 1790–1812: Donald MacDonald
9. 1813–56: William MacRae
10. 1856–58: John Reid
11. 1857–87 (Barvas Free): Allan MacArthur
12. 1858–92 (Parish): James Strachan
13. 1859–76 (Back Free): Donald MacMaster
14. 1877–80 (Back Free): John MacLean
15. 1881 (Back Free, Free Continuing): Hector Cameron
16. 1888–1902 (Barvas Free/UF): Neil Morrison
17. 1893–1911 (Parish): Lachlan MacKinnon
18. 1903–23 (UF): Donald Morrison
19. 1911–24 (Parish): Norman Laing
20. 1925–32 (UF): Murdo Mackay
21. 1935–47: Donald Macdonald
22. 1949–52: James Mackay
23. 1953–62: John Macnaughton
24. 1966–73: Alexander Morrison
25. 1973–81: Aonghas Macdonald
26. 1981–90: Hector Morrison
27. 1993: Ivor Macdonald

Cross or Ness:

1. 1829–33: Finlay Cook
2. 1833–39: John MacRae
3. 1840–43: John Finlayson (Parish/Free)
4. 1844–76: Donald MacRae (Free)
5. 1853–57: James Gunn (Parish)
6. 1857–59: Roderick Fraser (Parish)
7. 1859–60: James Bain (Parish)
8. 1861–78: Donald MacKay (Parish)
9. 1879–91: Duncan MacBeath (Free)
10. 1878–87, 88–89: Godfrey MacRae (Parish)
11. 1893–1938: Donald M. MacDonald (Free/UF/Parish)
12. 1900–05: John MacKay (Parish)
13. 1905–34: John MacPhail (Parish)
14. 1941–64: Malcolm Smith
15. 1965–73: Duncan MacKinnon
16. 1973–80: John Ferguson
17. 1982–91: Alexander Macdonald
18. 1993–98: Kenneth MacPherson

Knock or Ey:

1. 1829–31: Robert Finlayson
2. 1831–44: Duncan Matheson (Parish/Free)
3. 1845–66: Donald Murray (Free)
4. 1849–60: Alexander Bethune (Parish)
5. 1861–64: James MacDonald (Parish)
6. 1864–70: Ewen Campbell (Parish)
7. 1869–85: Malcolm MacRitchie (Free)
8. 1870–73: Colin MacDonald (Parish)
9. 1874: Alexander Carmichael (Parish)
10. 1875–77: John Gillies (Parish)
11. 1878–91: Donald MacKay (Parish)
12. 1886–1928: George MacLeod (Free/UF)
13. 1892–95: Archibald McCallum (Parish)
14. 1895–1926: Angus MacLeod (Parish)
15. 1930–35: Lachlan Macleod
16. 1937–63: Harry MacKinnon
17. 1964–82: William MacDonald
18. 1984: James MacDonald

Lochs:

1. 1724–59: Colin Mackenzie
2. 1760–67: Alexander Mackay
3. 1768–84: James Wilson
4. 1784–92: John Fraser
5. 1793–1830: Alexander Simpson
6. 1831–56: Robert Finlayson (Parish/Free)
7. 1844–69: Roderick Reid (Parish)
8. 1857–64: John MacRae (Free)
9. 1858–63: John McLean (Carloway Free)
10. 1865–75 (Free), 1895 (Shawbost Free, Free Continuing): George Campbell
11. 1870–89: Ewen Campbell (Parish)
12. 1874: Roderick Ross (Carloway Free)
13. 1876–1902: Roderick MacRae (Carloway Free/UF)
14. 1876–81: Hector Cameron (Free)
15. 1885–1901: John MacDougall (Free/UF)
16. 1885–96: John MacDonald (Kinloch Free)
17. 1886–88 (Park Free), 1902–13 (Lochs UF), 1913–23 (Carloway UF): Neil Morrison
18. 1889: Hector Kennedy (Park Free, Free Continuing)
19. 1890–1920: Donald MacCallum (Parish)
20. 1896–1923: John MacKay (Kinloch Free/UF)
21. 1903–13: Duncan MacLeod (Carloway UF)
22. 1914–27: Donald MacArthur (Lochs UF)
23. 1921–43: Duncan Matheson (Parish/Bernera)
24. 1924–27: John MacKay II (Kinloch UF)
25. 1925–28: Kenneth Maclean (Carloway UF)
26. 1928–33: Donald Macleod (Lochs UF/Crossbost)
27. 1931–64: Murdo Maclennan (Carloway)
28. 1933–36: Duncan Mackenzie (Crossbost)
29. 1933–44: Murdo MacSween (Kinloch)
30. 1936–50: Murdo MacKay (Crossbost)
31. 1943–46: Norman Morrison (Bernera)
32. 1944–57 (Kinloch), 1965–70 (Carloway): Angus MacKillop
33. 1950–82: Neil MacDonald (Crossbost)
34. 1951–66: William M. MacDonald (Bernera)
35. 1959–67: Roderick Murray (Kinloch)
36. 1963–67: William Mackenzie (Park)
37. 1967–74: Duncan MacAskill (Bernera)
38. 1968–77: David MacInnes (Kinloch)
39. 1968–91: Donald Macaulay (Park)
40. 1971–79: John MacArthur (Carloway)
41. 1975–79: Roderick Stewart (Bernera)
42. 1977–86: Norman MacSween (Kinloch)
43. 1983–85: Donald Maclean (Carloway)
44. 1988–94: Bruce Gardner (Carloway)
45. 1989: Kenneth MacLeod (Bernera)
46. 1989: Donald MacLennan (Kinloch)
47. 1993: Andrew Coghill (Crossbost)
48. 1997: Murdo Campbell (Carloway)

Stornoway:

1. 1601: Robert Durie
2. 1640s: Farquhar Clerk
3. c.1648–80: Donald Morrison
4. c.1680–1720: Kenneth Morrison
5. 1724–46: Daniel Morrison
6. 1747–72: John Clark
7. 1773–78: John Downie
8. 1789–1815: Colin Mackenzie
9. 1815–24: Simon Fraser
10. 1825–44: John Cameron
11. 1844–46: John Lees
12. 1847–77 (Parish): John Macrae
13. 1849–54 (Free): Duncan MacGregor
14. 1855–68 (Free): Peter MacLean
15. 1861–63 (UP): George Graham
16. 1866–70 (UP): James Holmes
17. 1872–99 (Free): James Greenfield
18. 1872–76 (UP): Charles McEwing
19. 1876–97 (English Free): Donald Martin
20. 1878–81 (Parish): Archibald MacDonald
21. 1879–1908 (UP/James St): James Hunter
22. 1881–94 (Parish): Alexander Stuart
23. 1894–97 (Parish): Hector MacKinnon
24. 1895–1902 (Free/High UF): Peter MacDonald
25. 1897–1901 (English Free/UF): John S. MacDonald
26. 1897–1903 (Parish): Donald MacKinnon
27. 1902–06 (English UF): Alexander Murray
28. 1903–11 (High UF): Walter Calder
29. 1904–13 (Parish): John McCallum
30. 1907–13 (English UF): Alexander McIver
31. 1908–13 (James St): John Telfer
32. 1911–49 (High UF/High): Roderick Morrison
33. 1913–20 (English UF): George Mills
34. 1913–19 (Parish): John Menzies
35. 1921–24 (English UF): Alexander White
36. 1921–22 (Parish): Murdo Macleod
37. 1922–24 (Parish): Alexander Ross
38. 1924–29 (Parish): John Mackenzie
39. 1924–27 (English UF): Donald MacInnes
40. 1928–31 (English UF/Martin's): Robert Inglis
41. 1930–35 (St Columba's): Angus MacLeod
42. 1932–34 (Martin's): Thomas Donn
43. 1935–45 (St Columba's): Lachlan Macleod
44. 1936–45 (Martin's): Ian Carmichael
45. 1946–67 (St Columba's): Roderick MacDonald
46. 1946–49 (Martin's): John Skinner
47. 1950–60 (Martin's): John de Lingen
48. 1950–80 (High): Angus MacCuish
49. 1961–64 (Martin's): Donald Gillies
50. 1965–75 (Martin's): Colin MacLean
51. 1969–85 (St Columba's): Kenneth MacLeod
52. 1976 (Martin's): Thomas Sinclair
53. 1981–94 (High): Roderick Morrison
54. 1986–98 (St Columba's): David Wright
55. 1998 (High): William Black

Uig:

1. fl. 1572: Ronald Anguson
2. 1726–41: John MacLeod
3. 1742–77: Norman Morrison
4. 1774–1823: Hugh Munro
5. 1824–43 (Parish/Free): Alexander MacLeod
6. 1845–56 (Parish): David Watson
7. 1846–85 (Free): John Campbell
8. 1857–58 (Parish): James Gunn
9. 1859–75 (Parish): Roderick Fraser
10. 1876–89 (Parish): Angus MacIver
11. 1879–87 (Free): Duncan Morrison
12. 1889–97 (Free): Nicol Campbell
13. 1890–1905 (Parish): John McPhail
14. 1899–1910 (Free/UF): Donald MacArthur
15. 1906–19 (Parish): Allan Mackenzie
16. 1912–20 (UF): James MacNiven
17. 1922–27 (Parish): Murdo MacLeod
18. 1923–62 (UF/Uigen): Norman MacLeod
19. 1928–30 (Parish): Roderick McInnes
20. 1931–50 (Baile-na-cille): Norman Morrison
21. 1951–79 (Baile-na-cille): Angus MacFarlane
22. 1964 (Uigen/Parish): William MacLeod

== Register of current and former buildings ==
Church	Founded	Closed
St Columba's, Eye or Uidh	Medieval	C18th
St Lennan's, Stornoway	1630	1794
St Olaf's/Aula's, Gress	Medieval	C19th
Cross Old Church	1829^{TC}	
Lionel Mission Hall, Ness		c. 2010
Callanish Mission Hall		c. 2017
Lemreway Church		2025
