= Moorfoot =

Moorfoot may refer to:

- Moorfoot Building – Office building in Sheffield, England
- Moorfoot Hills – Range of hills in east central Scotland
