= List of bridges in the United Kingdom =

Bridges in the United Kingdom and the Isle of Man is a link page for significant road bridges or footbridges in the United Kingdom.

- Significant railway bridges are listed under List of railway bridges and viaducts in the United Kingdom.
- Significant canal aqueducts are listed under List of canal aqueducts in the United Kingdom.

== England ==
=== Greater London ===
Name	Locality	Date	Grade	Notes
Albert Bridge	Battersea and Chelsea	1873	II*	
Battersea Bridge	Battersea and Chelsea	1890	II	
Blackfriars Bridge	Blackfriars	1869	II	
Chelsea Bridge	Chelsea and Battersea	1937	II	Suspension bridge
Chiswick Bridge	Chiswick and Mortlake	1933	II	
Golden Jubilee Bridges	Charing Cross and South Bank	2002		Footbridges flanking Hungerford Railway Bridge
Hammersmith Bridge	Hammersmith and Barnes	1887	II*	Suspension bridge
Hampton Court Bridge	Hampton and East Molesey (Surrey)	1933	II	South end in Surrey
Kew Bridge	Kew	1903	II	
Lambeth Bridge	Westminster and Lambeth	1932	II	
London Bridge	City of London and Southwark	1973		Box girder bridge
London Millennium Bridge	City of London and Bankside	2000		Suspension footbridge
Putney Bridge	Putney and Fulham	1886	II	
Richmond Bridge	Richmond	1777	I	
Richmond Footbridge	Richmond and St Margarets, London	1894	II*	
Royal Victoria Dock Bridge	London Docklands	1998		High level footbridge
Southwark Bridge	City of London and Southwark	1921	II	
Tower Bridge	Tower Hamlets and Southwark	1894	I	Bascule bridge
Twickenham Bridge	Richmond	1933	II*	
Vauxhall Bridge	Vauxhall and Pimlico	1906	II*	
Wandsworth Bridge	Battersea and Parsons Green	1940		Cantilever bridge
Waterloo Bridge	South Bank	1945	II*	Box girder bridge
Westminster Bridge	Westminster and Lambeth	1862	II*	

=== Rest of England ===
Name	County	Locality	Date	Grade	Notes
A34 Road Bridge	Oxfordshire	Oxford	1961		spans the River Thames
A419 Road Bridge	Wiltshire	Cricklade	1988		spans the River Thames
Abingdon Bridge	Oxfordshire	Abingdon	1927	II	crosses the River Thames
Acton swing bridge	Cheshire	Acton Bridge	1933		spans the River Weaver
Albert Bridge, Datchet	Berkshire	Datchet and Old Windsor	1927		Spans the River Thames
Albert Bridge, Manchester	Greater Manchester	Manchester and Salford	1785	II	spans the River Irwell
Aldford Iron Bridge	Cheshire	Aldford	1824	I	crosses the River Dee
Avonmouth Bridge	Somerset	Avonmouth	1974		carries M5 over the River Avon
Bakewell Bridge	Derbyshire	Bakewell	c1300s	I	crosses the River Wye
Baslow Bridge	Derbyshire	Baslow	1608	I	crosses the River Derwent
Barle Bridge	Somerset	Dulverton	Middle Ages	II	crosses the River Barle
Barnstaple Long Bridge	Devon	Barnstaple	1280	I	crosses the River Taw
Barton Road Swing Bridge	Greater Manchester	Barton-upon-Irwell	1894	II	Swing bridge over the Manchester Ship Canal
Bathampton Toll Bridge	Somerset	Bath	1872	II	crosses River Avon
Beckfoot Bridge	West Yorkshire	Bingley		II	spans Harden Beck.
Beckfoot Bridge	West Yorkshire	Bingley		II	spans Harden Beck.
Beggar's Bridge	North Yorkshire	Glaisdale	1619	I	crosses the River Esk, North Yorkshire
Bethells Bridge	East Riding of Yorkshire	Hempholme	c1812		swing bridge over the Driffield Navigation
Bewdley Bridge	Worcestershire	Bewdley	1798	I	crosses the River Severn
Bideford Long Bridge	Devon	Bideford	C15	I	crosses the River Torridge
Black Boys Bridge	Berkshire	Newbury			crosses the Reading to Taunton railway
Blackfriars Bridge	Greater Manchester	Manchester	1820	II	crosses the River Irwell
Blakeborough's Bridge	West Yorkshire	Brighouse	1962		Spans the River Calder, Now a footbridge.
Blaydon Bridge	Tyne and Wear	Newcastle upon Tyne	1990		spans the River Tyne
Bloomers Hole Footbridge	Oxfordshire	Buscot Lock	2000		steel footbridge across the River Thames
Boothferry Bridge	East Riding of Yorkshire	Booth	1929		Spans the River Ouse
Blue Bridge	North Yorkshire	York	1929–30		spans the River Foss
Botley Bridge	Oxfordshire	Oxford			Crosses Seacourt Stream
Bow Bridge, Iwood	Somerset	Congresbury	c. 1810	II	Spans the Congresbury Yeo
Bow Bridge, Plox	Somerset	Bruton	C15	I	spans the River Brue
Bradford Bridge	Somerset	Bradford-on-Tone	C13-15	II*	spans the River Tone
Breydon Bridge	Norfolk	Great Yarmouth	1985		Carries A12 road across the River Yare
Bridge of Sighs	Cambridgeshire	Cambridge	1831	I	crosses the River Cam
Bridge of Sighs	Oxfordshire	Oxford	1914		footbridge over New College Lane
Brighouse Bridge	West Yorkshire	Brighouse	1825		spans the River Calder
Bristol Bridge	Bristol	Bristol	1768	II	crosses Bristol Harbour
Bromford Viaduct	West Midlands	Birmingham	1972		M6 Motorway bridge over the River Tame. Longest viaduct in Britain.
Broughton Suspension Bridge	Greater Manchester	Salford	1826		Collapsed 1831 and rebuilt. Replaced 1924.
Bulstake Bridge	Oxfordshire	Oxford	c. 1530		Spans Bulstake Stream
Burghfield Bridge	Berkshire	Burghfield Bridge	c. 1812	II	crosses the River Kennet
Bury Bridge	Somerset	Brompton Regis	Medieval	II*	spans the River Haddeo
Bywell Bridge	Northumberland	Bywell and Stocksfield	1838	II	crosses the River Tyne
Byker Bridge	Tyne and Wear	Newcastle upon Tyne	1878		crosses the Ouseburn
Cambeck Bridge	Cumbria	Cambeck Bridge	C19	II	crosses the River Irthing
Castle Eaton Bridge	Wiltshire	Castle Eaton	1893		Iron bridge crossing the River Thames
Castle Walk Footbridge	Shropshire	Shrewsbury	1951		pre-stressed concrete footbridge over the River Severn
Cathedral Green Footbridge	Derbyshire	Derby	2009		carries pedestrians across the River Derwent
Cavendish Bridge	Derbyshire and Leicestershire	Cavendish Bridge	1957		crosses the River Trent
Caversham Bridge	Berkshire	Reading	1926		crosses the River Thames
Chartershaugh Bridge	Tyne and Wear	Sunderland	1975		spans the River Wear
Chertsey Bridge	Surrey	Chertsey	1785	II	Spans the River Thames
Chester New Bridge	County Durham	Chester-le-Street	C15?	II*	spans the River Wear
Chesters Bridge	Northumberland	Chollerford	C3		ruined Roman bridge over the River Tyne
Chollerford Bridge	Northumberland	Chollerford	1785	II	spans the River North Tyne
Clare College Bridge, Cambridge	Cambridgeshire	Cambridge	1640	I	crosses the River Cam
Clattern Bridge	Surrey	Kingston upon Thames	1175	I	crosses the River Thames
Cleveland Bridge	Somerset	Bath	1826	II*	spans the River Avon
Clifton Bridge	North Yorkshire	York	1963		spans the River Ouse
Clifton Bridge	Nottinghamshire	Nottingham	1958		spans the River Trent
Clifton Hampden Bridge	Oxfordshire	Clifton Hampden	1867	II*	crosses the River Thames
Clifton Suspension Bridge	Bristol	Clifton	1864	I	Isambard Kingdom Brunel's bridge over the Avon Gorge
Clopton Bridge	Warwickshire	Stratford-upon-Avon	1480	I	crosses the River Avon
Clun Bridge	Shropshire	Clun	1450	II*	Packhorse bridge over River Clun
Cobden Bridge	Hampshire	Southampton	1928		spans the River Itchen
Cobweb Bridge	South Yorkshire	Sheffield	2002		footbridge over the River Don
Collingham Bridge	West Yorkshire	Collingham	c.1790	II	spans the Collingham Beck.
Colne Bridge	West Yorkshire	Huddersfield	C18	II	spans the River Colne
Conksbury Bridge	Derbyshire	Over Haddon	C18	II	spans the River Lathkill
Constantius Bridge	Northumberland	Hexham	1976		spans the River Tyne
Conway's Bridge	Berkshire	Park Place	1763		Carries the A321 Wargrave to Henley on Thames over the Happy Valley
Cookham Bridge	Berkshire	Cookham	1867		Iron girder bridge over the Thames
Corbridge Bridge	Northumberland	Corbridge	1674	I	spans the River Tyne
Corporation Bridge	Lincolnshire	Grimsby	1928		Bascule bridge over dock
Corporation Street Bridge	Greater Manchester	Manchester	1999		Covered footbridge over Corporation Street
Cox Green Footbridge	Tyne and Wear	Sunderland	1958		Footbridge over the River Wear
Cricklade Town Bridge	Wiltshire	Cricklade	1852		spans the River Thames
Croft Bridge	North Yorkshire	Croft on Tees	c. 14th century	I	Spans the River Tees
Cropredy Bridge	Oxfordshire	Cropredy	1937		spans the River Cherwell
Crosskeys Bridge	Lincolnshire	Sutton Bridge	1897	II*	Swing bridge over the River Nene
Culham Bridge	Oxfordshire	Culham	1422	II*	Crosses the Swift Ditch, previously the main channel of the River Thames
Darley Bridge	Derbyshire	Darley Dale	c1500s	II*	Crosses the River Derwent
Dartford Crossing	see Queen Elizabeth II Bridge				
Dell Bridge	Merseyside	Port Sunlight	1894	II	Footbridge over former tidal hollow
Derwent Bridge	Derbyshire	Howden Reservoir	C1600s		spans the River Derwent
Donnington Bridge	Oxfordshire	Oxford	1962		spans The Isis (River Thames)
Dove Bridge	Staffordshire and Derbyshire	Doveridge	Middle Ages	II*	Crosses the River Dove
Duck Bridge	North Yorkshire	Danby	Middle Ages	II*	Packhorse bridge over the River Esk
Duke Street Bridge	Merseyside	Wallasey	1926		spans Wallasey Pool
Dunham Bridge	Lincolnshire and Nottinghamshire	Dunham-on-Trent	1832		Toll bridge over the River Trent
Dutton Horse Bridge	Cheshire	Acton Bridge and Dutton	1919	II	Wooden footbridge over the River Weaver
Eamont Bridge	Cumbria	Eamont Bridge	C15	I	crosses the River Eamont
Eaton Footbridge	Oxfordshire		1936		wooden footbridge across the River Thames
Eckington Bridge	Worcestershire	Eckington	1720	II*	spans the River Avon
Egerton Bridge	Merseyside	Wallasey	1931		spans Wallasey Pool
Elvet Bridge	County Durham	Durham	C13	I	spans the River Wear
English Bridge	Shropshire	Shrewsbury	1926	II*	spanning the River Severn
Essex Bridge	Staffordshire	Great Haywood	1550	I	spans the River Trent
Exeter Bridge	Derbyshire	Derby	1929		Spans the River Derwent
Eysey Footbridge	Wiltshire	Cricklade			Footbridge across the River Thames
Featherstone Bridge	Northumberland	Featherstone	1775	II*	crosses the River South Tyne
Fingle Bridge	Devon	Drewsteignton	C17	II*	spanning the River Teign
Folly Bridge	Oxfordshire	Oxford	1827		spans the River Thames
Foss Bridge	North Yorkshire	York	1812	II*	spans the River Foss
Four Bridges	Merseyside	Wallasey	1926		spans Wallasey Pool
Framwellgate Bridge	County Durham	Durham	C15	I	spans the River Wear
Gallox Bridge, Dunster	Somerset	Dunster	C15	I	crosses the River Avill
Galton Bridge	West Midlands	Smethwick	1829	I	Crosses canal. World's longest single-span bridge when built by Thomas Telford
Gasworks Bridge	Oxfordshire	Oxford	1886		Footbridge across the River Thames
Gateshead Millennium Bridge	Tyne and Wear	Gateshead and Newcastle upon Tyne	2001		Pedestrian tilt bridge over River Tyne
Gathurst Viaduct	Greater Manchester	Shevington	1961		spans the River Douglas valley
Godmanchester Chinese Bridge	Cambridgeshire	Godmanchester	1827/2010	II*	spans the River Great Ouse
Godstow Bridge	Oxfordshire	Godstow	medieval	II	spans the River Thames
Goring and Streatley Bridge	Berkshire and Oxfordshire	Streatley and Goring	1923		spans the River Thames
Grandpont Bridge	Oxfordshire	Oxford	1990		Footbridge across the River Thames
Great Barford Bridge	Bedfordshire	Great Barford	C15	I	spans the River Great Ouse
Greyhound Bridge	Lancashire	Lancaster	1911		former railway bridge, now road bridge, over the River Lune
Grindleford Bridge	Derbyshire	Grindleford	c1758	II	crosses the River Derwent
Grosvenor Bridge	Somerset	Bath			spans the River Avon east of the city
Grosvenor Bridge	Cheshire	Chester	1832	I	spans the River Dee
Gull Wing Bridge	Suffolk	Lowestoft	2024		The largest bridge of its kind in the world to date
Gunthorpe Bridge	Nottinghamshire	Gunthorpe	1875		built mainly of iron across the River Trent
Halfpenny Bridge	Gloucestershire	Lechlade	1792		Crosses the River Thames
Handyside Bridge	Derbyshire	Derby	1878		Former wrought iron railway bridge, now footbridge across the River Derwent
Hannington Bridge	Gloucestershire and Wiltshire	Hannington Wick	1841		Crosses the River Thames
Harrington Bridge	Derbyshire and Leicestershire	Sawley	1790	II	spans the River Trent
Hart's Weir Footbridge	Oxfordshire	Appleton	1879		Concrete footpath over the River Thames
Haselbury Bridge	Somerset	Haselbury Plucknett	C14	II*	spans the River Parrett
Haydon Bridge Viaduct	Tyne and Wear	Haydon Bridge	2009		spans the railway and the River South Tyne
Henley Bridge	Oxfordshire and Berkshire	Henley and Remenham	1786	I	spans the River Thames
Hexham Bridge	Northumberland	Hexham	1793	II*	Crosses the River Tyne
Heyford Bridge	Oxfordshire	Lower Heyford	c. 16th century	II*	Crosses the River Cherwell
Hibaldstow Bridge	Lincolnshire	Hibaldstow	1889	II	Iron arch bridge over the River Ancholme
High Bridge	Lincolnshire	Lincoln	1160	I	spans the River Witham. Oldest bridge in UK with shops.
High Bridge	Berkshire	Reading	1788		across the River Kennet
High Level Bridge	Tyne and Wear	Newcastle upon Tyne	1849	I	Road and rail bridge across the River Tyne
Hockenhull Platts	Cheshire	Tarvin	C18	II	Three footbridges across the River Gowy
Holgate Bridge	North Yorkshire	York	1911		Crosses the East Coast Main Line
Holman's Bridge	Buckinghamshire	Aylesbury	by 1554		Crosses the River Thame. Where the Battle of Aylesbury took place.
Holme Bridge	Derbyshire	Bakewell	1664	I	crosses the River Wye
Holne Bridge	Devon	Ashburton	1413	II*	crosses the River Dart
Holt Fleet Bridge	Worcestershire	Holt Fleet	1828	II	over the River Severn
Homersfield Bridge	Norfolk and Suffolk	Homersfield	1870	II*	spans the River Waveney
Horkstow Bridge	Lincolnshire	Horkstow	1836	II*	Suspension Bridge over the New River Ancholme
Horrabridge Bridge	Devon	Horrabridge	c. 1400	I	spans the River Walkham
Hulme Arch Bridge	Greater Manchester	Manchester	1997		carries Stretford Road over Princess Road
Humber Bridge	East Riding of Yorkshire and Lincolnshire	Kingston-upon-Hull	1981		longest single-span bridge in the UK, spanning the Humber Estuary
Huntington Warren Clapper Bridge	Devon	Dartmoor	unknown		Spans the River Avon
Hylton Viaduct	Tyne and Wear	Sunderland	1974		steel box girder bridge over the River Wear
Infinity Bridge	County Durham	Stockton-on-Tees	2008		North Shore Development, carrying pedestrians across the River Tees
The Iron Bridge	Shropshire	Ironbridge	1781	I	Crosses the River Severn. World's first cast-iron bridge.
Isis Bridge	Oxfordshire	Oxford	1965		Crosses the River Thames
Itchen Bridge	Hampshire	Southampton	1977		Crosses the River Itchen
Ireland Bridge	West Yorkshire	Bingley	1686	II	Spans the River Aire
Ivelet bridge	North Yorkshire	Ivelet	C16	II*	spans the River Swale
Jubilee Bridge (Stockton-on-Tees)	County Durham	Stockton-on-Tees	2002		spans the River Tees
King George V Bridge	Lincolnshire	Keadby	1916	II	Rolling lift road and rail bridge over the River Trent
Kildwick Bridge	North Yorkshire	Kildwick	1313	I	spans the River Aire
Kingsferry Bridge	Kent	Isle of Sheppey	1960		Vertical-lift bridge. Crosses the Swale between the Isle of Sheppey and mainland Kent.
Kingsmead Viaduct	Hertfordshire	Ware	1976		Crosses the Lea Valley
Kingsgate Bridge	County Durham	Durham	1966	II	Footbridge across the River Wear
Kingsland Bridge	Shropshire	Shrewsbury	1881	II	Toll bridge across the River Severn
Kirkstead Bridge	Lincolnshire	Woodhall Spa	1968		spans the River Witham
Lady Bay Bridge	Nottinghamshire	West Bridgford	1878		Former railway bridge, now road bridge, over the River Trent
Lady's Bridge	South Yorkshire	Sheffield	1485	II	spans the River Don
Landacre Bridge	Somerset	Withypool	Late Medieval	II*	spans the River Barle
Langstone Bridge	Hampshire	Hayling Island	1956		links Hayling Island to mainland
Ledgard Bridge	West Yorkshire	Mirfield	1800	II	crosses the River Calder
Leeds Bridge	West Yorkshire	Leeds	1870	II	spans the River Aire
Lendal Bridge	North Yorkshire	York	1863	II	spans the River Ouse
Linton Bridge	West Yorkshire	Linton and Collingham	mid-19th century	II	spans the River Wharfe. Damaged and closed, December 2015
Lion Bridge	Northumberland	Alnwick		I	spans the River Aln
Little Wittenham Bridge	Oxfordshire	Dorchester-on-Thames			Iron and wood footbridge over the River Thames
Loyn Bridge	Lancashire	Hornby and Gressingham		II*	spans the River Lune
Ludford Bridge	Shropshire	Ludford	C15	I	Spans the River Teme
Lune Millennium Bridge	Lancashire	Lancaster	2001		Footbridge over the River Lune
M25 Runnymede Bridge	Surrey	Staines upon Thames	1940s		carries A30 and M25 across the River Thames
M3 Chertsey Bridge	Surrey	Chertsey Lock	1970s		Carries M3 over the River Thames
M4 Thames Bridge	Berkshire and Buckinghamshire	Bray and Dorney Reach	1960s		carries M4 over the River Thames
Magdalen Bridge	Oxfordshire	Oxford	1790		crosses the River Cherwell
Maidenhead Bridge	Berkshire and Buckinghamshire	Maidenhead and Taplow	1777	I	Spans the River Thames
Marlow Bridge	Buckinghamshire and Berkshire	Marlow and Bisham	1832	I	Suspension bridge across the River Thames
Marlow By-pass Bridge	Buckinghamshire and Berkshire	Marlow and High Wycombe	1972		crosses the River Thames
Malmsmead Bridge	Devon and Somerset	Brendon and Oare	C17	II	crosses Badgworthy Water
Mathematical Bridge	Cambridgeshire	Queens' College, Cambridge	1749	II	Wooden footbridge over River Cam
Matlock Bridge	Derbyshire	Matlock	C15	II*	crosses the River Derwent
Media City Footbridge	Greater Manchester	Salford	2011		Footbridge over the Manchester Ship Canal
Medley Footbridge	Oxfordshire	Binsey	1865		Pedestrian bridge over arm of the River Thames
Medway Viaducts	Kent	Rochester	1963		span the River Medway
Mersey Gateway Bridge	Cheshire	Halton	2017		Cable-stayed bridge over the River Mersey
Michaelson Road Bridge	Cumbria	Barrow-in-Furness	1960		Bascule bridge
Middlesbrough Transporter Bridge	North Yorkshire	Middlesbrough	1911	II*	road bridge over the River Tees
Midland Bridge	Somerset	Bath	1905		ex-railway bridge. Now road bridge across the River Avon
Mill Bridge	Derbyshire	Alport	C18	II	crosses the River Lathkill
Millhouse Bridge	Northumberland	Millhouse	1883		Footbridge over the River South Tyne
Millennium Bridge	North Yorkshire	York	2001		Footbridge over the River Ouse
Monk Bridge	North Yorkshire	York	1794		spans the River Foss
Monk Bretton Bridge	East Sussex	Rye	1893		spans the River Rother
Montford Bridge	Shropshire	Montford Bridge	1792	II	spans the River Severn
Mythe Bridge	Gloucestershire	Tewkesbury	1826	II*	spans the River Severn
Naburn Railway Bridge	North Yorkshire	York	1871		Former railway bridge, now a footbridge over the River Ouse
Nantwich Bridge	Cheshire	Nantwich	1803	II	crosses the River Weaver
New Bridge, Bath	Somerset	Bath	1734	II*	spans the River Avon
Newbridge, River Dart	Devon	Ashburton	1413	II*	spans the River Dart
Newbridge, River Thames	Oxfordshire	Abingdon and Whitney	C14	I and II*	spans the River Thames
Newburn Bridge	Tyne and Wear	Newburn	1893		Spans the River Tyne
Newsham Bridge	Lincolnshire	Brocklesby Park	1772	I	crosses Newsham Lake
North Bridge, Halifax	West Yorkshire	Halifax	1871		Cast iron bridge over the valley of the River Hebble
Northam Bridge	Hampshire	Southampton	1954		Spans the River Itchen. The first major prestressed concrete road bridge in the United Kingdom.
Northgate, Chester	Cheshire	Chester	1810	I	Footbridge over Northgate Street
Northern Spire Bridge	Tyne and Wear	Sunderland	2018		spans the River Wear
North Northallerton bridge	North Yorkshire	Northallerton	2022		spans the Northallerton–Eaglescliffe railway line
Old Bridge, Huntingdon	Cambridgeshire	Huntingdon	1332	I	spans the River Great Ouse
Old Dee Bridge	Cheshire	Chester	1387	I	spans the River Dee
Old Exe Bridge	Devon	Exeter	c.1200	II, scheduled monument	ruined; formerly crossed the River Exe
Old Haydon Bridge	Northumberland	Haydon Bridge	1776	II	spans the River South Tyne. Now pedestrian only.
Old Loyne Bridge	Lancashire	Lancaster			Crossed the River Lune. Demolished 1802
Old Man's Bridge	Oxfordshire	Rushey Lock	1894		Wooden footbridge across the River Thames
Old Walton Bridge	Surrey	Walton on Thames and Shepperton	1750		Crossed the River Thames. Dismantled 1783
Orwell Bridge	Suffolk	Ipswich	1982		spans the River Orwell
Osney Bridge	Oxfordshire	Oxford	1889		spans the River Thames
Otley Bridge	West Yorkshire	Otley	1228	Scheduled monument	spans the River Wharfe. Widened in 1775–6. Pedestrian walkway added in 1957.
Ouse Bridge, York	North Yorkshire	York	1821	II	spans the River Ouse
Ouse Bridge (M62)	North Yorkshire	Goole and Howden	1976		carrying the M62 motorway over the River Ouse
Over Bridge	Gloucestershire	Over	1828	Scheduled monument	spans the River Severn. Now for pedestrian use only.
Ovingham Bridge	Northumberland	Ovingham	1883		Spans the River Tyne
Palatine Bridge, Salford	Greater Manchester	Salford	1864		Wrought iron bridge over the River Irwell
Penny Bridge	Merseyside	Wallasey	1926		spans Wallasey Pool
Pero's Bridge	Bristol	Bristol	1999		pedestrian bascule bridge spanning St Augustine's Reach
Perry Bridge	West Midlands	Birmingham	1711	II	spans the River Tame
Pill Bridge	Somerset	Ilchester and Long Sutton	C17	Scheduled monument	spans the River Yeo
Poole Bridge	Dorset	Poole	1927		Bascule bridge over harbour channel
Porthill Bridge	Shropshire	Shrewsbury	1922		Pedestrian suspension bridge over the River Severn
Postbridge Clapper Bridge	Devon	Postbridge	C13	II*	crosses the East Dart
Prebends Bridge	County Durham	Durham	1778	I	spans the River Wear
Preston Pipe Bridge	County Durham	Stockton-on-Tees	1959		carries water pipes across the River Tees
Princess of Wales Bridge	County Durham	Stockton-on-Tees	1992		crosses the River Tees
Pulteney Bridge	Somerset	Bath	1774	I	Crosses the River Avon. A unique traffic bridge that includes shops along its length
Queen Alexandra Bridge	Tyne and Wear	Sunderland	1909	II	spans the River Wear
Queen Elizabeth Bridge	Berkshire	Windsor	1966		carries the A332 Windsor By-pass across the River Thames
Queen Elizabeth II Bridge	Kent and Essex	Dartford and Thurrock	1991		Cable stayed bridge over Thames estuary
Radcot Bridge	Oxfordshire	Radcot	c. 1200	I	spans the River Thames
Rakewood Viaduct	Greater Manchester	Littleborough	1966		Carries M62 Motorway over Rakewood Valley
Rastrick Bridge	West Yorkshire	Brighouse	c1750		Spans the River Calder
Reading Bridge	Berkshire	Reading	1923		spans the River Thames
Redheugh Bridge	Tyne and Wear	Newcastle upon Tyne and Gateshead	1983		spans the River Tyne
Ridley Bridge	Northumberland	Ridley Hall	1792	II*	spans the River South Tyne
Rimmer's Bridge/Greens Lane	Merseyside	Lydiate			spans Leeds-Liverpool Canal
River Ouse swing bridge	North Yorkshire	Selby	2004		Spans the River Ouse
Robbers Bridge	Somerset	Porlock			spans Weir Water
Rochester Bridge	Kent	Rochester and Strood	1914		crosses the River Medway
Rotherbridge bridge	West Sussex	Rotherbridge	2010		Footbridge over the River Rother
Rotherham Bridge	South Yorkshire	Rotherham	by 1483	I	spans the River Don
Royal Tweed Bridge	Northumberland	Berwick-upon-Tweed	1928	II*	spans the River Tweed
Saint Alkmund's Way Footbridge	Derbyshire	Derby	2007		carries pedestrians across the River Derwent
St George's Bridge	Shropshire	Shrewsbury	c1362		Demolished bridge over the River Severn
St Ives Bridge	Cambridgeshire	St Ives	C15	I	spans the River Great Ouse
St John's Bridge, Lechlade	Gloucestershire	Lechlade	1886		Crosses the River Thames
Salford Quays lift bridge	Greater Manchester	Salford	2000		vertical lift footbridge spanning the Manchester Ship Canal
Scale Lane Footbridge	East Riding of Yorkshire	Kingston upon Hull	2013		Footbridge spanning the Manchester Ship Canal
Scammonden Bridge	West Yorkshire	Scammonden	1970		Crosses M62 motorway. The longest single span non-suspension bridge in the world when built
Scotswood Bridge	Northumberland	Newcastle upon Tyne and Gateshead	1967		Spans the River Tyne
Selby toll bridge	North Yorkshire	Selby	1793		Spans the River Ouse
Summit Bridge	West Midlands	Smethwick	1789	II*	Crosses the Old Main Line of the Birmingham Canal Navigations
Shaldon Bridge	Devon	Teignmouth and Shaldon	1931 (original built in 1827)		Spans the River Teign
Shard Bridge	Lancashire	Hambleton and Singleton	1993		spans the River Wyre
Sheppey Crossing	Kent		2006		Crosses the Swale to link the Isle of Sheppey with the Kent mainland
Shillingford Bridge	Oxfordshire	Shillingford	1827	II*	Crosses the River Thames
Shoreham Tollbridge	West Sussex	Shoreham	1782	II*	Footbridge across the River Adur
Silver Jubilee Bridge	Cheshire	Runcorn and Widnes	1961	II	Crosses the River Mersey. Also called Runcorn-Widnes bridge
Skeldergate Bridge	North Yorkshire	York	1881	II	spans the River Ouse
Skerton Bridge	Lancashire	Lancaster	1787	II*	spans the River Lune
Sonning Backwater Bridges	Oxfordshire	Sonning	1986		Cross two branches of the River Thames
Sonning Bridge	Berkshire and Oxfordshire	Sonning	1775	II	spans the River Thames
Spa Bridge	North Yorkshire	Scarborough	1827		Footbridge over ravine
Staines Bridge	Surrey	Staines upon Thames	1832		spans the River Thames
Stoke Bridge	Suffolk	Ipswich	1925		Spans the River Orwell
Styford Bridge	Northumberland	Riding Mill	1979		Spans the River Tyne
Summerleaze Footbridge	Berkshire and Buckinghamshire	Bray and Dorney	1996		Carries footpath over the River Thames
Sunderland Bridge	County Durham	Sunderland Bridge	C 14	I	spans the River Wear
Surtees Bridge	Durham	Thornaby-on-Tees	2008		spans the River Tees
Sutton Bridge, Oxfordshire	Oxfordshire	Sutton Courtenay	1807	II	spans the River Thames
Swarkestone Bridge	Derbyshire	Swarkestone	C13	I	crosses the River Trent
Sweet Track	Somerset		3806 BC		walk bridge, 1.2 miles
Swinford Toll Bridge	Oxfordshire	Eynsham	1769		Privately owned toll bridge across the River Thames
Swing Bridge, River Tyne	Tyne and Wear	Newcastle upon Tyne and Gateshead	1876	II*	Swing bridge over the River Tyne
Tadcaster Bridge	North Yorkshire	Tadcaster	c1700	II	crosses the River Wharfe. Partially collapsed December 2015
Tadpole Bridge	Oxfordshire	Bampton and Buckland	C18		spans the River Thames
Tamar Bridge	Devon and Cornwall	Plymouth and Saltash	1962		road bridge across the River Tamar
Tarr Steps	Somerset	Exmoor National Park	1000 BC	I	an historic clapper bridge over the River Barle
Tees Barrage	Durham	Stockton-on-Tees	1995		Barrage across the River Tees
Tees Newport Bridge	County Durham and North Yorkshire	Middlesbrough and Stockton-on-Tees	1934	II	first vertical-lift bridge in Britain
Teesquay Millennium Footbridge	Durham	Stockton-on-Tees	2000		cable-stayed footbridge across the River Tees
A19 Tees Viaduct (Tees Flyover)	North Yorkshire	Middlesbrough	1975		Carries A19 over the River Tees
Temple Footbridge	Berkshire and Buckinghamshire	Hurley	1989		spans the River Thames
Tenfoot Bridge	Oxfordshire	Buckland and Chimney	1869		Wooden footbridge over the River Thames
Teston Bridge	Kent	Teston	C14	I	spans the River Medway
Thelwall Viaduct	Cheshire	Lymm	1995		carries M6 over the Manchester Ship Canal and the River Mersey
Thornborough Bridge	Buckinghamshire	Thornborough and Buckingham	C14	I	crosses Padbury Brook
Thorp Arch Bridge	West Yorkshire	Boston Spa	1770	II	Stone arch bridge over the River Wharfe
Tickford Bridge	Buckinghamshire	Newport Pagnell	1810	I	Iron bridge over the River Ouzel
Tinsley Viaduct	South Yorkshire	Sheffield	1968		Carries M1 over Don Valley. First UK two-tier road-bridge
Trent Bridge	Lincolnshire	Gainsborough	1791	II	spans the River Trent
Trent Bridge	Nottinghamshire	Nottingham	1871	II	spans the River Trent
Trevemper Bridge	Cornwall	Trevemper	C19	II	crosses the River Ganner
Trinity Bridge	Lincolnshire	Crowland	1390	I	Former river crossing now on dry land.
Trinity Bridge, Greater Manchester	Greater Manchester	Manchester and Salford	1995		Footbridge across the River Irwell
Trinity College Bridge, Cambridge	Cambridgeshire	Cambridge	1765	I	Road Bridge over River Cam
Turnbridge Lift Bridge	West Yorkshire	Turnbridge	1865		Lift bridge over the Huddersfield Broad Canal
Twin Sails Bridge	Dorset	Poole	2012		Bascule bridge over Backwater Channel to harbour
Twizell Bridge	Northumberland	Duddo	1511	I	Crosses the River Till. Now a footbridge
Two Bridges	Devon	Two Bridges			(Both bridges) The new bridge: carries the B3357 road. The old bridge: carries traffic to and from the car park for the Two Bridges Hotel.
Tyne Bridge	Tyne and Wear	Newcastle upon Tyne and Gateshead	1928		Crosses the River Tyne
Valley Bridge	North Yorkshire	Scarborough	1865		spans Ramsdale
Victoria Avenue Bridge	Cambridgeshire	Cambridge	1890		spans the River Cam
Victoria Bridge, Bath	Somerset	Bath	1836	II*	spans the River Avon
Victoria Bridge, Datchet	Berkshire	Datchet and Windsor	1967		spans the River Thames
Victoria Bridge, Manchester	Greater Manchester	Manchester and Salford	1839	II	spans the River Irwell
Victoria Bridge (Stockton-on-Tees)	Durham	Stockton-on-Tees	1887	II	spans the River Tees
Vignoles Bridge	West Midlands	Coventry	1835	Scheduled monument	Cast iron footbridge over the River Sherbourne
Wallingford Bridge	Oxfordshire	Wallingford	C14	II*	spans the River Thames
Walney Bridge	Cumbria	Barrow-in-Furness	1908		Connects Walney Island to mainland. A Bascule bridge
Walton Bridge	Surrey	Walton-on-Thames	2013		Spans the River Thames
Warburton Toll Bridge	Greater Manchester	Warburton	c.1863		Crosses the Manchester Ship Canal and River Mersey
Warrington Bridge	Cheshire	Warrington			
Warrington Transporter Bridge	Cheshire	Warrington	1916	II*	Closed 1964
Water Eaton House Bridge	Wiltshire	Castle Eaton			Footbridge over the River Thames
Watergate, Chester	Cheshire	Chester	1790	I	Footbridge over A548
Wearmouth Bridge	Tyne and Wear	Sunderland	1929	II	spans the River Wear
Welsh Bridge	Shropshire	Shrewsbury	1795	II*	spans the River Severn
Wetherby Bridge	West Yorkshire	Wetherby	13th Century	II	spans the River Wharfe
Whitby Swing Bridge	North Yorkshire	Whitby	1909		Swing bridge over the River Esk
Whitchurch Bridge	Berkshire and Oxfordshire	Pangbourne and Whitchurch	1902	II	over the River Thames
Wilford Toll Bridge	Nottinghamshire	Wilford and Nottingham	1870	II (part)	Spans the River Trent. Closed to vehicles 1974.
Wilton Bridge	Herefordshire	Wilton and Ross-on-Wye	1599	I	spans the River Wye
Windsor Bridge	Berkshire	Windsor and Eton	1824	II	Crosses the River Thames
Winterbrook Bridge	Oxfordshire	Wallingford	1993		Spans the River Thames
Wylam Bridge	Northumberland	North Wylam	1836		Spans the River Tyne
Wynch Bridge	County Durham	Teesdale	1741	II*	Suspension bridge footbridge over the River Tees
Yarrow Bridge	Lancashire	Chorley	C17		spans the River Yarrow

== England-Wales Border ==
Name	County	Locality	Date	Grade	Notes
Bigsweir Bridge	Gloucestershire and Monmouthshire	St Briavels and Llandogo	1827	II*	Cast-iron bridge over the River Wye
Farndon Bridge	Cheshire and Wrexham	Farndon and Holt	1339	I	Crosses the River Dee
Old Wye Bridge	Gloucestershire and Monmouthshire	Tutshill and Chepstow	1816	I	Spans the River Wye
Severn Bridge	Gloucestershire and Monmouthshire	Aust and Chepstow	1966	I	Suspension bridge crossing the River Severn and the River Wye
Second Severn Crossing	Gloucestershire and Monmouthshire	Severn Beach and Sudbrook	1996		Cable-stayed bridge crossing the River Severn

== Anglo-Scottish Border ==
Name	County	Locality	Date	Grade	Notes
Coldstream Bridge	Northumberland and Borders	Cornhill-on-Tweed and Coldstream	1767	II*	spans the River Tweed
Ladykirk and Norham Bridge	Northumberland and Borders	Norham and Ladykirk	1887	II	spans the River Tweed
Union Chain Bridge	Northumberland and Berwickshire	Horncliffe and Fishwick	1820	I	spans the River Tweed

== Scotland ==
=== Glasgow ===
Includes bridges partly in another local authority area (e.g South Lanarkshire). All bridges are over the River Clyde unless otherwise specified.

Name	Locality	Date	Grade	Notes
Albert Bridge	Saltmarket and Gorbals	1871	Cat A	Road bridge (A8); adjacent to City Union Bridge
Auchenshuggle Bridge	Auchenshuggle and Clydebridge	2011		Motorway bridge, carries M74 over Clyde; footpaths (Clyde Walkway / National Cycle Route 75 on underside)
Bell's Bridge	Pacific Quay and SECC	1988		Footbridge between BBC Pacific Quay and the SEC Armadillo, built for the Glasgow Garden Festival
Belmont Bridge	Hillhead and North Kelvinside	1870	Cat B	Road bridge across the River Kelvin
Benalder Street Bridge	Partick and Yorkhill	1896		Road bridge across the River Kelvin
Botanic Gardens Bridge	Glasgow Botanic Gardens and North Kelvinside		Cat B	Footbridge across the River Kelvin
Bogleshole Road Bridge	Eastfield and Clydesmill Industrial Park	1986		Road bridge
Cambuslang Bridge	Cambuslang and Clydesmill Industrial Park	1892		Road bridge, now closed to traffic but open to pedestrians; sometimes referred to as Orion Bridge
Cambuslang Footbridge	Cambuslang and Clydesmill Industrial Park	1977		Footbridge, built to replace adjacent Cambuslang Bridge
Clydeford Bridge	Carmyle and Cambuslang	1976		Road bridge (A763), built to replace nearby Cambuslang Bridge
Clyde Arc	Finnieston and Pacific Quay	2006		Road bridge, known colloquially as the Squinty Bridge
Cuningar Loop Footbridge	Dalmarnock and Cuningar Loop	2016		Footbridge to park
Dalmarnock Bridge	Rutherglen and Dalmarnock	1891	Cat B	Road bridge
Delvin Road Bridge	Cathcart	1890	Cat B	Road bridge (westbound traffic only) across the White Cart Water
Eldon Street Bridge	Hillhead and Woodlands	1895	Cat B	Road bridge across the River Kelvin
Garscube Bridge	Bearsden and Maryhill	1925		Road bridge across the River Kelvin (A81)
George V Bridge	Tradeston and Glasgow City Centre	1928	Cat B	Road bridge (A77, northbound traffic only); adjacent to Caledonian Railway Bridge
Glasgow Bridge	Central Glasgow (Jamaica Street) and Laurieston	1899	Cat B	Road bridge (A77, southbound traffic only), sometimes referred to as Jamaica Bridge; adjacent to Caledonian Railway Bridge
Great Western Bridge	Hillhead and Woodlands	1891	Cat A	Road bridge across the River Kelvin (A82)
Holmlea Road Bridge	Cathcart	1901	Cat B	Road bridge across the White Cart Water
Kelvindale Bridge	Kelvindale and Wyndford	1899		Road bridge across the River Kelvin
Kelvin Way Bridge	Kelvingrove Park	1914	Cat B	Road bridge across the River Kelvin
King's Bridge	Hutchesontown and Glasgow Green	1933	Cat C	Road bridge (A74)
Kingston Bridge	Kingston and Anderston	1970		Cantilever bridge conveying the M8 over the River Clyde
Kirklee Bridge	Kelvinside and North Kelvinside	1899	Cat B	Road bridge across the River Kelvin
Lambhill Bridge	Cadder and Lambhill	1930	Cat C	Road bridge across the Forth and Clyde Canal
Linn Park Bridge	Linn Park and Netherlee	1820	Cat B	Iron footbridge across the White Cart Water in Linn Park
MacQuisten Bridge	Newlands and Shawlands	1832	Cat C	Road bridge (A77) across the White Cart Water
Millbrae Bridge	Langside	1901	Cat B	Road bridge across the White Cart Water
Millennium Bridge	Pacific Quay and SECC	2002		Footbridge between Glasgow Science Centre and Crowne Plaza hotel
Pollokshaws Road Bridge	Pollokshaws	1930		Road bridge (B769) across the White Cart Water (replaced original 1798 bridge)
Polmadie Bridge	Glasgow Green and Oatlands	2018		Footbridge to park (replaced original 1955 bridge)
Prince of Wales Bridge	Kelvingrove Park	1895	Cat B	Road bridge (only accessible to restricted vehicles within park) across the River Kelvin
Partick Bridge	Partick and Kelvingrove Park	1878	Cat B	Road bridge across the River Kelvin (replaced Snow Bridge for traffic)
Pollok House Bridge	Pollok Country Park	1758	Cat A	Bridge across the White Cart Water (only accessible to restricted vehicles within park)
Queen Margaret Bridge	Hillhead and North Kelvinside	1929	Cat B	Road bridge across the River Kelvin (adjacent to Glasgow Botanic Gardens)
Riverford Bridge	Newlands and Pollokshaws	1930		Road bridge across the White Cart Water
Rutherglen Bridge	Shawfield and Bridgeton	1896		Road bridge
Shawfield Smartbridge	Shawfield and Dalmarnock	2014		Footbridge
Shaws Bridge	Pollokshaws	1934		Road bridge across the White Cart Water (replaced older bridges, original from 1650)
South Portland Street Suspension Bridge	Glasgow city centre (Clyde Street) and Laurieston	1853	Cat A	Footbridge
Snow Bridge	Partick and Kelvingrove Park	1800	Cat B	Footbridge to park across the River Kelvin (replaced for road traffic by Partick Bridge in 1878); also known as Old Dumbarton Road Bridge
Snuff Mill Bridge	Cathcart and Simshill	1725	Cat B	Footbridge across the White Cart Water
St. Andrew's Suspension Bridge	Glasgow Green and Hutchesontown	1855	Cat A	Footbridge
Temple Bridge	Temple and Dawsholm Park	1932	Cat C	Road bridge (A739) across the Forth and Clyde Canal
Tradeston Bridge	Tradeston and IFSD (Broomielaw)	2009		Footbridge, known colloquially as the Squiggly Bridge
Victoria Bridge	Central Glasgow (Stockwell Street) and Laurieston	1854	Cat A	Road bridge (A730), sometimes referred to as Stockwell Bridge; adjacent to City Union Bridge

=== Rest of Scotland ===
Name	County	Locality	Date	Grade	Notes
Almond Aqueduct	Edinburgh / West Lothian	Ratho	1821	Cat A	Carries the Union Canal across the River Almond
Almondell Aqueduct	West Lothian	East Calder	1822	Cat A	Carries water across the River Almond to supply the Union Canal
Almondell Viaduct	West Lothian	East Calder	1867	Cat B	Crosses the River Almond
Ballachulish Bridge	Inverness-shire	Ballachulish	1975		Crosses the narrows between Loch Leven and Loch Linnhe
Bonar Bridge	Scottish Highlands	Bonar Bridge	1973		Crosses the Kyle of Sutherland
Bothwell Bridge	South Lanarkshire	Bothwell		Cat A	Carries the B7071 over the River Clyde and the A725 road
Bridge of Awe	Argyll	Taynuilt	1756		Spanned the River Awe. Destroyed by floods in 1992 and replaced by new bridge.
Bridge of Dee	Aberdeen	Aberdeen	1527	Cat A	spans the River Dee
Bridge of Oich	Scottish Highlands	Aberchalder	1850		Taper suspension bridge spanning the River Oich
Brig o' Balgownie	Aberdeen	Old Aberdeen	1320	Cat A	spans the River Don
Canongate Bridge	Scottish Borders	Jedburgh	16th Century	Cat A	Sandstone bridge, was the main entrance into the town over the Jed Water
Carrbridge Packhorse Bridge	Scottish Highlands	Carrbridge	1717	Cat B	Packhorse Bridge, built to allow funeral procession to cross the River Dulnain
Clachan Bridge	Argyll and Bute	Oban	1793	Cat A	spans the Clachan Sound, connecting the Isle of Seil to the Scottish mainland.
Clackmannanshire Bridge	Fife and Falkirk	Kincardine	2008		Carries the A876 over the Firth of Forth (bridge is not actually in Clackmannanshire)
Clyde Bridge	North Lanarkshire and South Lanarkshire	Motherwell	1932		Carries the A723 road over the River Clyde
Clyde's Bridge	South Lanarkshire	Abington			Crosses the River Clyde
Clydesholm Bridge	South Lanarkshire	Kirkfieldbank	1699	Cat A	Crosses the River Clyde
Connel Bridge	Argyll and Bute	Connel	1903	Cat B	Cantilever bridge over Loch Etive
Cowie Bridge	Aberdeenshire	Stonehaven			Stone arch bridge over the Cowie Water
Craigellachie Bridge	Moray	Aberlour	1814	Cat A	Cast iron bridge across the River Spey
Cramond Old Bridge	Edinburgh	Cramond	15th century	Cat A	Stone arch bridge across the River Almond
Cromarty Bridge	Ross and Cromarty	Black Isle	1979		Prestressed beam bridge across the Cromarty Firth
Crossford Bridge	South Lanarkshire	Crossford	1793	Cat B	Carries the B7056 over the River Clyde
Brig o' Doon	Ayrshire	Alloway	C15	Cat A	spans the River Doon
Dornoch Firth Bridge	Ross and Cromarty and Sutherland	Tain and Dornoch	1991		Crosses Dornoch Firth
Dryburgh Suspension Bridge	Scottish Borders	Dryburgh Abbey	1872		Suspension footbridge across the River Tweed
Drygrange Old Bridge	Scottish Borders	Melrose	1780	Cat A	Disused bridge over the River Tweed
Erskine Bridge	West Dunbartonshire and Renfrewshire	Erskine	1971		Cable-stayed box girder bridge, carries the A898 over the River Clyde
Findhorn Viaduct (Forres)	Moray	Forres	1858	Cat A	Carries a single track railway over the River Findhorn
Findhorn Viaduct (Tomatin)	Scottish Highlands	Tomatin	1897	Cat B	Carries a single track railway over the River Findhorn
Forth Road Bridge	Edinburgh and Fife	South Queensferry and North Queensferry	1964	Cat A	Carries the A90 road over the Firth of Forth
Friarton Bridge	Perth and Kinross	Perth	1978		carries M90 motorway across the River Tay
Garrion Bridge (old)	South Lanarkshire	Garrion Bridge	1817	Cat B	Carries the A71 road / A72 road over the River Clyde (eastbound traffic)
Garrion Bridge (new)	South Lanarkshire	Garrion Bridge	2002		Carries the A71 road / A72 road over the River Clyde (westbound traffic)
Haughhead Bridge	South Lanarkshire	Uddingston	1840	Cat B	Carries the B758 over the River Clyde
Inveramsay Bridge	Aberdeenshire	Inveramsay	2016		Carries the A96 road over the Aberdeen to Inverness Line
Kalemouth Suspension Bridge	Scottish Borders	Kalemouth	c. 1830	Cat A	Wrought iron bridge spanning the River Teviot
Kelso Bridge	Scottish Borders	Kelso	1803	Cat A	spans the River Tweed
Ken Bridge	Dumfries and Galloway	New Galloway	1824	Cat A	spans the Water of Ken
Kessock Bridge	Inverness and Scottish Highlands	Inverness and North Kessock	1982		Crosses the Beauly Firth, to connect Inverness and the Black Isle
Kincardine Bridge	Falkirk and Fife	Kincardine	1936		Crosses upper reaches of the Firth of Forth
King George VI Bridge	Aberdeen	Aberdeen	1941		spans the River Dee
Kirkfieldbank Bridge	South Lanarkshire	Kirkfieldbank	1959		Carries the A72 road over the River Clyde
Kirkland Bridge	East Renfrewshire and South Lanarkshire	Eaglesham		Cat C	Carries the B764 over the White Cart Water
Kyle of Tongue Bridge	Sutherland		1971		Crosses the Kyle of Tongue
Kylesku Bridge	Sutherland		1984		Box girder bridge crossing the Loch a' Chàirn Bhàin
Laxford Bridge	Scottish Highlands	Sutherland	c. 1834	Cat B	spans the River Laxford
Mauldslie Bridge	South Lanarkshire	Dalserf	1861	Cat A	Crosses the River Clyde
Mertoun Bridge	Scottish Borders	St Boswells	1873		spans the River Tweed
Millhousebridge Bridge	Dumfries and Galloway	Millhousebridge	1827	Cat A	spans the River Annan
Musselburgh Bridge	East Lothian	Musselburgh	16th C.	Cat A	spans the River Esk
Old Bridge of Dee	Dumfries and Galloway	Bridge of Dee	1740	Cat A	spans the River Dee
Overtoun Bridge	West Dumbartonshire	Dumbarton	1895	Cat B	An arch bridge over the Overtoun Burn.
Perth Bridge	Perth and Kinross	Perth	1771	Cat A	A stone arch bridge, also known as Smeaton's Bridge, crossing the River Tay.
Queensferry Crossing	Edinburgh and Fife	South Queensferry and North Queensferry	2017		Cable-stayed bridge, carries M90 motorway over Firth of Forth
River Leven Bridge	Fife	Glenrothes	1995		a cable-stayed bridge spanning Riverside Park and the River Leven
St. Devenick's Bridge	Aberdeen	Ardoe and Cults	1837		A derelict suspension footbridge known locally as Shakkin' Briggie
Skye Bridge	Inner Hebrides	Isle of Skye	1995		between Kyle of Lochalsh on the mainland and Kyleakin on the Isle of Skye
Tay Road Bridge	Fife and Dundee	Newport-on-Tay	1966		Carries A92 road over the Firth of Tay
Tweed Bridge	Scottish Borders	Peebles	C15	Cat A	spans the River Tweed
White Cart Viaduct	Renfrewshire	Paisley	1968		23-span steel/concrete composite viaduct comprising haunched cantilever river spans and anchor spans with a central suspended span; carries M8 motorway over White Cart Water
Victoria Bridge	Aberdeenshire	Mar Lodge Estate	1905	Cat B	Private bridge over the River Dee
Yair Bridge	Scottish Borders	Yair	c1764	Cat A	spans the River Tweed

== Northern Ireland ==
Name	County	Locality	Date	Grade	Notes
Albert Bridge	County Antrim and County Down	Belfast	1890		Spans the River Lagan
Ballievey Bridge	County Down	Banbridge	1988		Spans the River Bann
Bann Bridge	County Londonderry	Coleraine	1924		Only bascule railway bridge in Northern Ireland, spans the River Bann
Bleach Green Viaducts	County Antrim	Newtownabbey	1933		Burrowing railway junction across St. Valentine's Glen
Boyne Bridge	County Antrim	Belfast	1936		
Carrick-a-Rede Rope Bridge	County Antrim	Ballintoy	2008		Pedestrian walkway to Carrickarede island.
Charlemont Bridge	County Tyrone	Moy	1855		Stone arch bridge between Moy and Charlemont.
Coleraine Bridge	County Londonderry	Coleraine	1844		Iconic triple stone arch bridge over the Lower River Bann in Coleraine built in 1844.
Craigavon Bridge	County Londonderry	Derry	1933		Double deck bridge over the River Foyle. Lower deck a former goods line
Craigmore Viaduct	County Armagh	Newry	1852		Tallest railway bridge in Ireland
Crawfordsburn Viaduct	County Down	Crawfordsburn	1865		Carries the Belfast – Bangor railway line across Crawfordsburn Park
Crumlin Viaduct	County Antrim	Crumlin	1915		Carries a railway line across a road which is itself a bridge over a river
Dargan Bridge	County Antrim and County Down	Belfast	1994		Longest railway bridge in Ireland
Dromore Viaduct	County Down	Dromore	1861		Former railway viaduct
Finn Bridge	County Fermanagh and County Monaghan (ROI)	Scotshouse	1856		Spans the River Finn between Northern Ireland and the Republic of Ireland
Foyle Bridge	County Londonderry	Derry	1984		Spans the River Foyle
Governor's Bridge	County Antrim and County Down	Stranmillis	1970		Spans the River Lagan
Keady Viaduct	County Armagh	Keady	1910		Former railway viaduct
King's Bridge	County Antrim and County Down	Stranmillis	1910		Spans the River Lagan
Lagan Viaduct	County Antrim	Belfast	1976		Carries the Derry, Larne and Bangor lines across the River Lagan
Lifford Bridge	County Tyrone and County Donegal (ROI)	Lifford	1964		Spans the River Foyle between Northern Ireland and the Republic of Ireland
M3 Bridge	County Antrim and County Down	Belfast	1995		Short motorway comprised almost solely of a bridge across the River Lagan
MacNeill's Egyptian Arch	County Armagh	Newry	1851		Carries Belfast – Dublin line across the A25 road
Ormeau Bridge	County Antrim and County Down	Belfast	1863		Spans the River Lagan
Peace Bridge	County Londonderry	Derry	2011		Pedestrian & cycleway over the Belfast-Derry railway line and the River Foyle
Queen Elizabeth II Bridge	County Down	Belfast	1966		Spans the River Lagan
Queen's Bridge	County Down	Belfast	1849		Spans the River Lagan
Quoile Bridge	County Down	Downpatrick	1999		
Carries the Downpatrick and County Down Railway across the River Quoile	Senator George Mitchell Peace Bridge	County Fermanagh and County Cavan (ROI)	Belturbet	1999	Named after George J. Mitchell for his role in the peace process
Sandelford Bridge	County Londonderry	Coleraine	1844		Spans the River Bann.
Shaw's Bridge	County Down	Belfast	1707		Spans the River Lagan
Shaw's Bridge (A55)	County Antrim and County Down	Belfast	1977		Spans the River Lagan
Tassagh Viaduct	County Armagh	Tassagh	1910		Former railway viaduct

== Wales ==
- Brecon, Usk Bridge
- Britannia Bridge
- Briton Ferry Bridge, carries the M4 over the River Neath south of the town of Neath
- Cardiff, Cardiff Bridge
- Conwy Suspension Bridge, by Thomas Telford
- Menai Suspension Bridge, by Thomas Telford
- Monnow Bridge, Monmouth
- Newport Bridge
- Newport, Caerleon Bridge
- Newport, City Bridge
- Newport City footbridge
- Newport, George Street Bridge
- Newport, M4 motorway Usk bridge
- Newport Transporter Bridge
- Waterloo Bridge, Betws-y-Coed, by Thomas Telford

== Isle of Man ==
Name	Locality	Date	Grade	Notes
Braddan Bridge	Braddan			crosses the River Dhoo

== See also ==
- List of railway bridges and viaducts in the United Kingdom
- List of canal aqueducts in the United Kingdom
- List of lattice girder bridges in the United Kingdom
- List of tunnels in the United Kingdom
- List of bridges by country

=== Further lists ===
- Category:Bridges across the River Wear
- Crossings of the River Severn
- Category:Crossings of the River Tees
- Category:Crossings of the River Tyne
- Crossings of the River Thames
- List of bridges in Cambridge
- List of bridges in London
- Bridges of York
- List of bridges over the River Torridge
- List of bridges designed by John Carr
