= Bow Bridge =

Bow Bridge may refer to:

- Bow Bridge, Cumbria, England
- Bow Bridge, Iwood, England
- Bow Bridge, Plox, England
- Bow Bridge, London, England
- Bow Bridge, Western Australia, in the Shire of Denmark
- Bow Bridge, Central Park, New York, US

== See also ==
- Bowbridge, Gloucestershire, England
