= South Portland Street Suspension Bridge =

Suspension footbridge across the River Clyde in Glasgow, Scotland

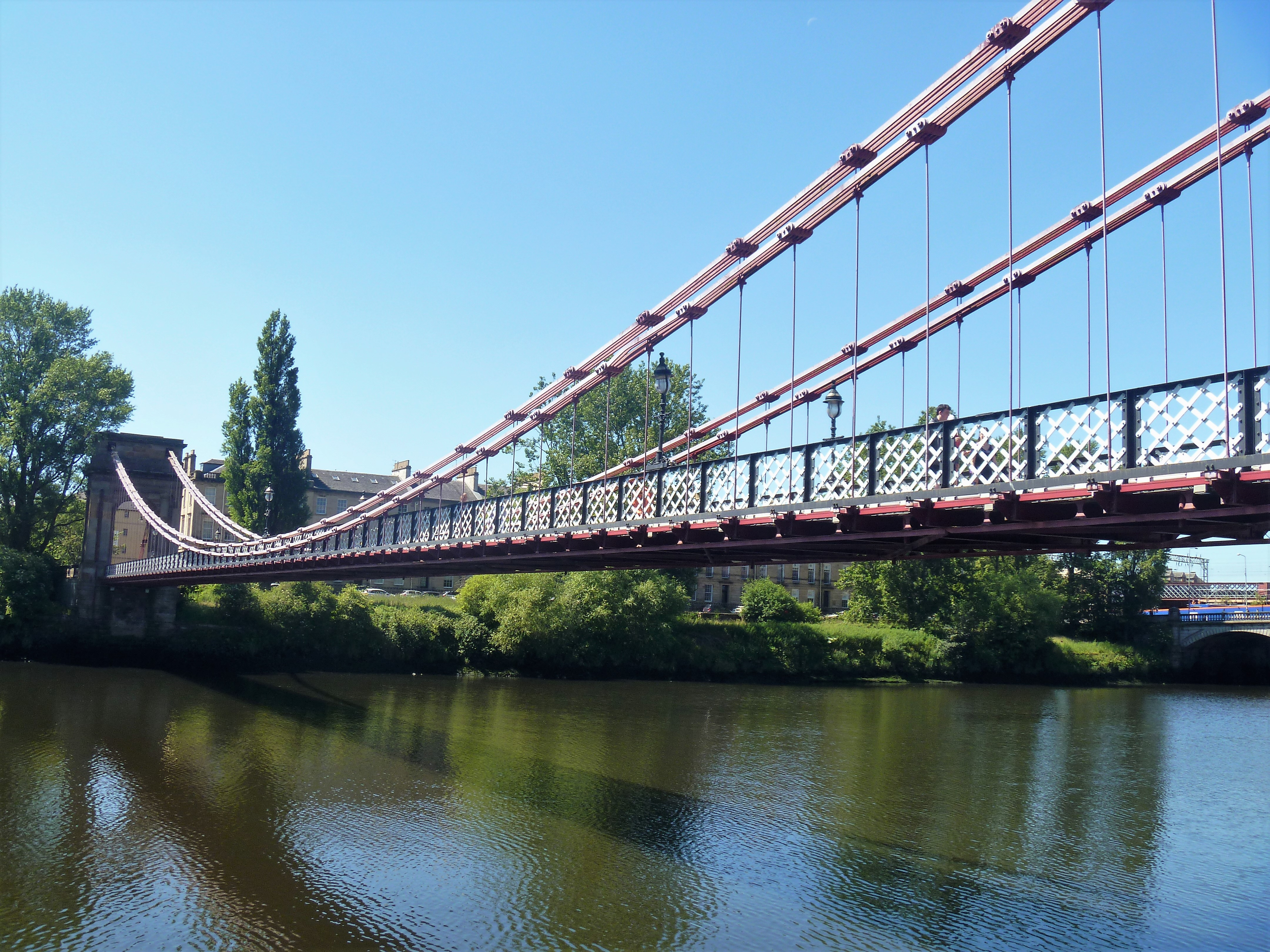
- Bridge crossing the River Clyde
- Coordinates: 55.854984°N 4.255561°W
- OS grid reference: NS 58907 64723
- Crosses: River Clyde
- Preceded by: Victoria Bridge
- Followed by: Glasgow Bridge

Characteristics
- Design: Suspension
- Total length: 126 metres (413 ft)
- Width: 4 metres (13 ft)

History
- Construction start: 1851
- Construction end: 1853

Listed Building – Category A
- Official name: Clyde Street And South Portland Street, Suspension Bridge
- Designated: 5 July 1966
- Reference no.: LB32668

Location
- Interactive map of South Portland Street Suspension Bridge

The South Portland Street Suspension Bridge is a suspension-type footbridge across the River Clyde in Glasgow, Scotland linking the City Centre on the north side to the Laurieston and Gorbals districts on the south side.

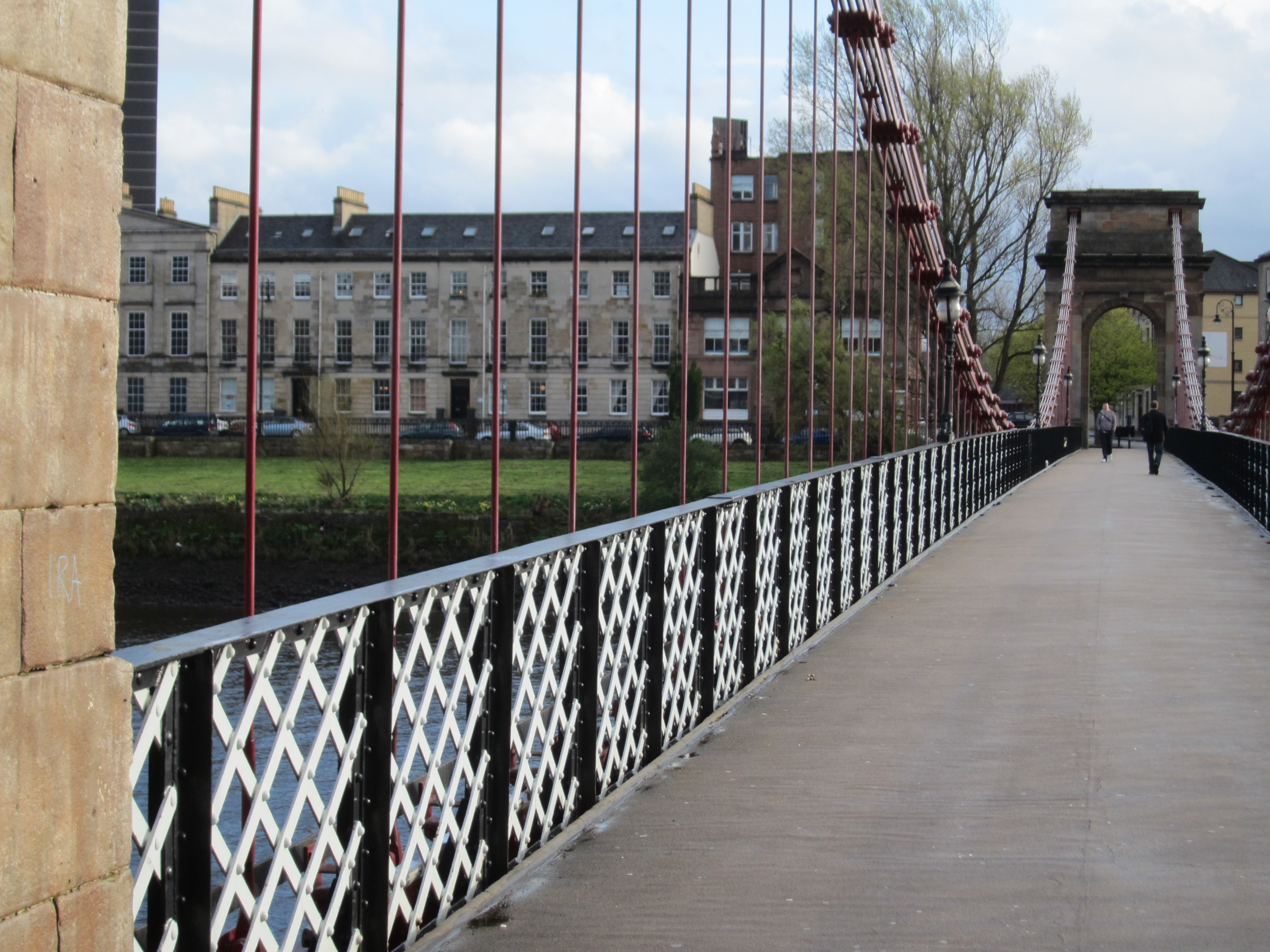
View looking south on the bridge, showing cables

The bridge, made from wrought iron with arched sandstone towers at either end, has a suspension span of 414 ft (126 m); the bridge deck is 13 ft (4.0 m) wide. It was built between 1851 and 1853, replacing a temporary wooden bridge on the same site (used from 1832 to 1846) designed by Robert Stevenson. Its structure was modified in 1871 and it has been refurbished on several further occasions, including repair work by Sir William Arrol & Co. in 1926.

The bridge is so named due to being the continuation of South Portland Street in Laurieston; however it is perpendicular to the better-known Carlton Place (a well-preserved cobbled street of Georgian terraces dating from the early 1800s) and so is sometimes known as Carlton Place Bridge or simply Glasgow Suspension Bridge although there is another bridge of this type upstream nearby. Both the bridge and the buildings of Carlton Place are category A listed.

== See also ==
- List of bridges in Scotland
