= Clyde's Bridge =

Bridge in the South Lanarkshire, Scotland

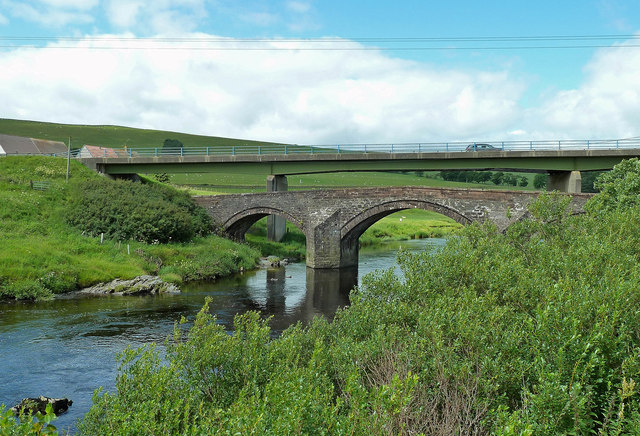
- Clyde's Bridge view
- Coordinates: 55.522563°N 3.678998°W
- Crosses: River Clyde
- Locale: South Lanarkshire

Listed Building – Category B
- Official name: Clyde's Bridge
- Designated: 11 January 1971
- Reference no.: LB14200

Location
- Interactive map of Clyde's Bridge

Clyde's Bridge, not to be confused with the similarly named Clyde Bridge further downstream, is the first major road bridge spanning the River Clyde in South Lanarkshire, Scotland. The bridge is directly upstream of the Wandel Road Bridge which carries the A702 from Duneaton Roundabout to Wandel.

== See also ==
- List of bridges in Scotland
