= Tweed Bridge =

Bridge in the Scottish Borders, Scotland

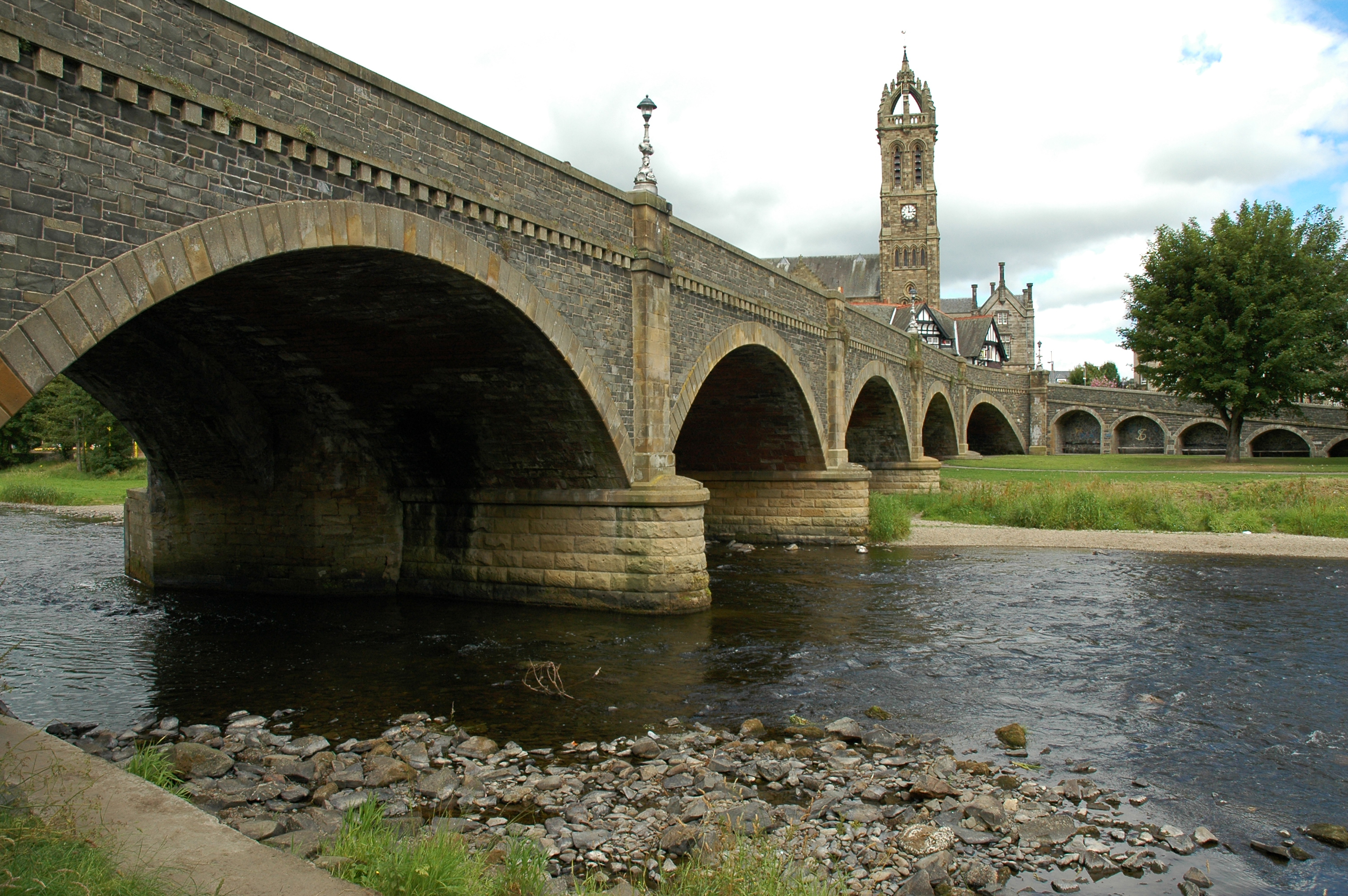
- Coordinates: 55.650331°N 3.192665°W
- Carries: B7062
- Crosses: River Tweed

Characteristics
- Material: Stone
- Width: 40 feet (12 m)
- No. of spans: 5

History
- Built: 15th century

Listed Building – Category A
- Official name: Tweed Bridge
- Designated: 22 February 1971
- Reference no.: LB39278

Location
- Interactive map of Tweed Bridge

The Tweed Bridge is a stone-built road bridge of five spans over the River Tweed in Peebles, in the Scottish Borders.

== History ==
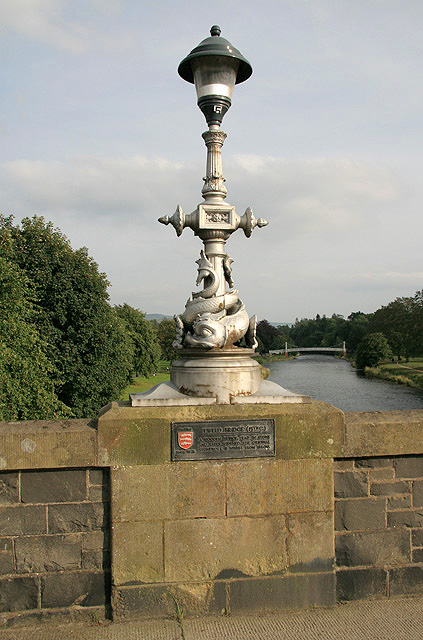
The dolphin street lamps date from the widening between 1897 and 1900

The Tweed Bridge is medieval in origin, although the exact date of its construction is unknown. Records show that a stone bridge has been maintained at the site since the middle of the 15th century, and work done in 1465 may have been the construction of a new bridge or substantial rebuilding or maintenance of an existing one. A mason known as John of Peebles may have worked on the bridge at that time. A plaque on the bridge states that it was originally a wooden bridge clad in stone.

It was reconstructed in 1663 using stone from St Andrew's Church which had been destroyed in 1548 by an English army as part of the Rough Wooing. John Hisplop added three additional arches to the south end of the bridge in 1799, but these were removed when the Peebles Railway was built.

The bridge was widened from 8 feet (2.4 m) to 21 feet (6.4 m) in 1834 by adding stonework to both sides. This work was done by John and Thomas Smith of Darnick, and the cost of around £1,000 was funded by public subscription. Between 1897 and 1900, it was widened again to 40 feet (12 m) by adding to the downstream side. This work, which cost about £8,000, was done by McTaggart, Cowan and Barker, and funded by the Town Council.

On the south side of the bridge the remains of Second World War defences were evident until the road was resurfaced.

The bridge was listed as a category A listed building in 1971. Plans are being considered for an additional bridge over the Tweed in the town.

== Design ==
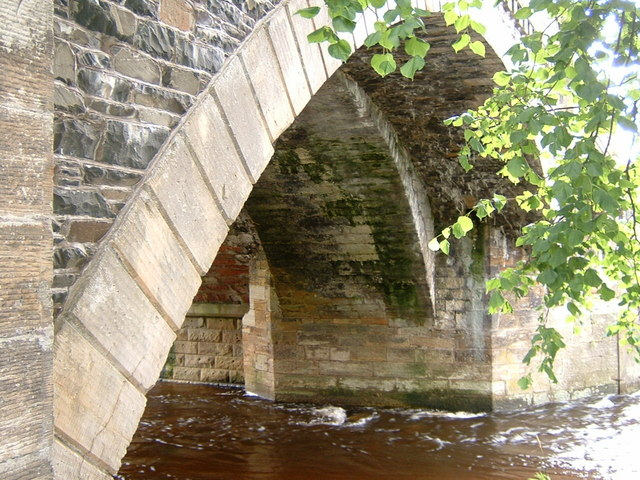
The effect of adding to the bridge can be seen from below

The five spans vary in length from 38 feet (12 m) to 42 feet (13 m). The oldest part of the bridge uses arches which are almost circular, but the more modern parts use flatter segmental arches. On the upstream side the piers have triangular ashlar cutwaters, and rounded profiles on the downstream side. At the north end of the bridge is an arched ramp to the east that leads to Tweed Green.

The Tweed Bridge is the only road crossing of the Tweed within Peebles. It carries the B7062 public road, which is two lanes wide at this point. Near to the Tweed Bridge is the Cuddy Bridge, a single arch bridge over the Eddleston Water, a tributary of the Tweed.

== See also ==
- List of bridges in Scotland
