= George Edwin Ewing =

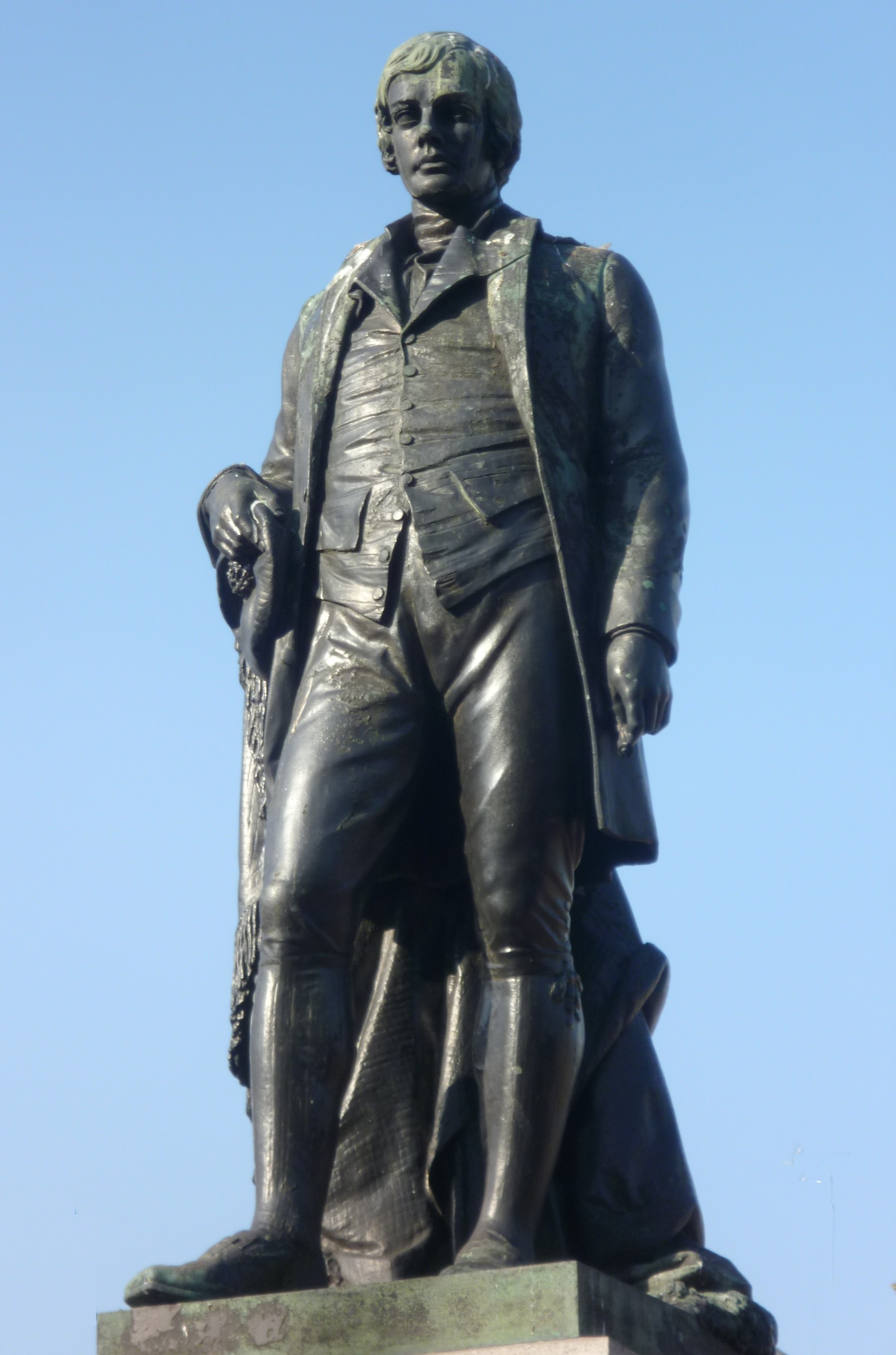
Robert Burns, George Square, Glasgow

George Edwin Ewing (8 July 1828 – 26 April 1884) was a Scottish sculptor.

He was born in Birmingham, the son of sculptor James Ewing and the brother of sculptor James Alexander Ewing.

He grew up in Edinburgh and Glasgow and learned his trade in Liverpool and London, including in the modelling room of Covent Garden Theatre, before setting up in business in Glasgow in 1859. He then spent some time in Rome in the 1860s studying under the sculptor John Gibson before returning to Glasgow in 1862.

He went on to be the most successful Scottish sculptor of his time. Whilst his reputation stemmed from his marble busts of prominent Scots and the Royal Family, his most well-known commission was the bronze statue of Robert Burns in George Square, Glasgow, created in 1874–77, which was later enhanced with three bronze panels by his brother James in 1885–7. Whereas much of his work on public buildings has been lost during demolition, significant works remain to be seen in the cemeteries of Glasgow and Edinburgh.

In 1879 he moved to America for health reasons, working in New York and Philadelphia, but achieving only limited success. His body was found in a gas-filled room in 1884 at the Brevoort Hotel, New York, where he was working on medallion portraits of Sir Henry Irving and Ellen Terry. He was buried at Greenwood Cemetery, Brooklyn.

== Works ==
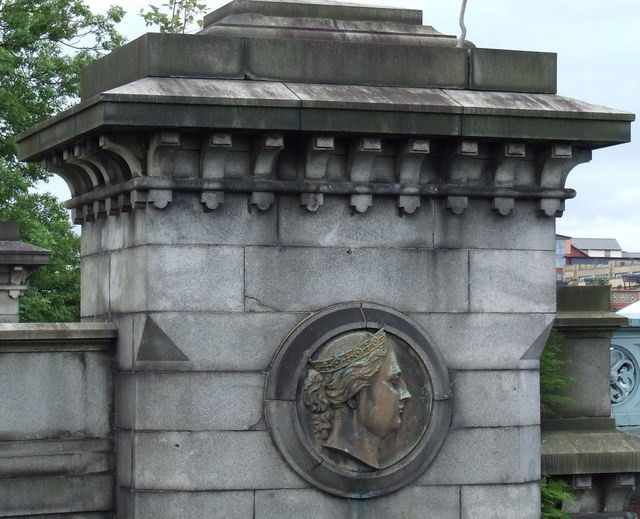
Queen Victoria medallion, Albert Bridge

- Mrs William Sim (1862)
- Lord Clyde (1863)
- Lord Elcho; Daniel Macnee; Thomas Faed; John Baird, of Cambusdoon
- Prince of Wales and Princess of Wales (1869)
- Sir Archibald Alison, the politician
- Sir Charles Tennent, the chemical manufacturer
- Queen Victoria and Prince Albert medallions, Albert Bridge, Glasgow (1871)
- William Sim, Contractor to Glasgow Corporation's Police and Statute Labour Committee (1872)
- Robert Burns (1877)
