= Inveramsay Bridge =

Bridge in Aberdeenshire, Scotland

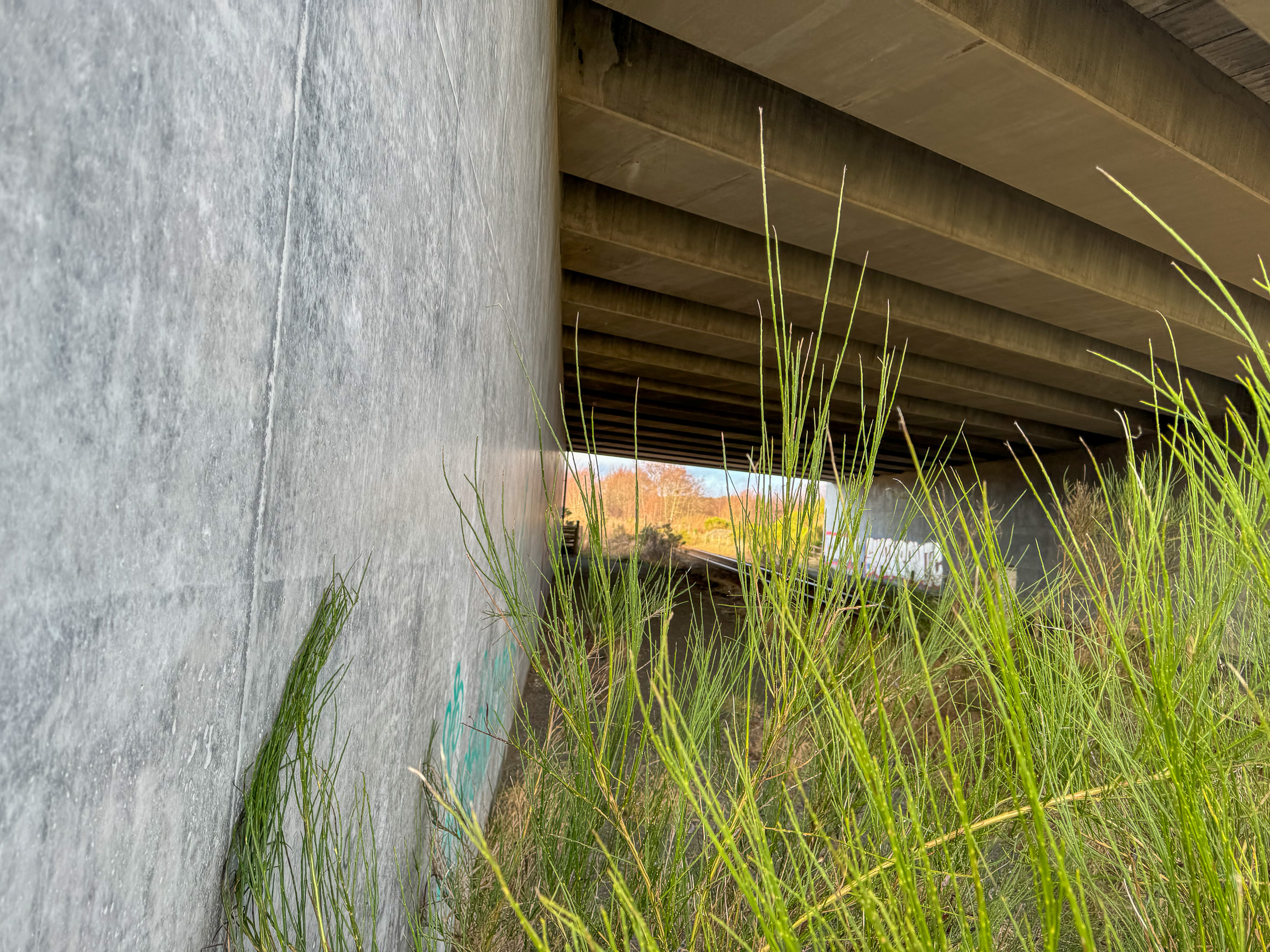
- Underside of bridge
- Coordinates: 57.314574°N 2.433544°W
- Carries: A96
- Crosses: Aberdeen to Inverness Line
- Locale: Aberdeenshire
- Maintained by: Transport Scotland

History
- Designer: Balfour Beatty
- Construction start: December 2014
- Construction end: March 2016
- Construction cost: GBP 11,000,000
- Replaces: Inveramsay Rail Bridge

Location
- Interactive map of Inveramsay Bridge

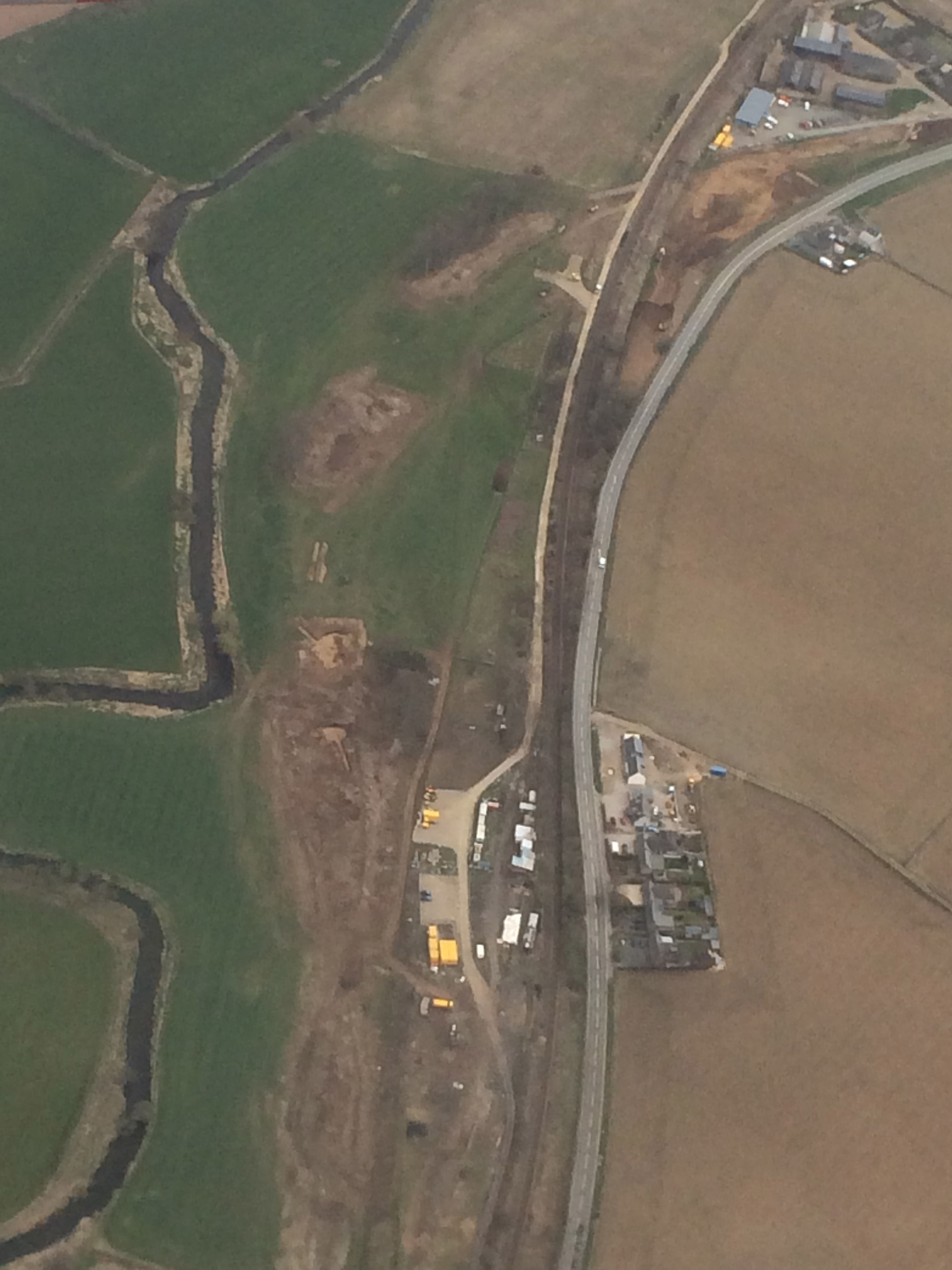
Construction of the inveramsay bridge on 17 April 2015

The Inveramsay Bridge is a new bridge carrying the A96 over the Aberdeen to Inverness Line. The bridge was constructed by Balfour Beatty. It was inaugurated in March 2016. The existing bridge has a 4.4 metre height restriction and cannot fit two tall vehicles under it because of the arch which goes under 3.7 metres high in places so traffic lights were put in place so only one row of vehicles could go under the bridge at once, the traffic lights caused bad congestion at rush hour. For decades this bottleneck was a major problem in the North East's infrastructure with delays being caused on both the A96 and the Aberdeen to Inverness Line, caused by the speed limits imposed on the line following any HGV colliding the bridge, until the bridge could be inspected by a structural engineer. Despite this there was no political will from the three main UK parties (Conservative Party, Labour Party and the Liberal Democrats) all of whom had been in power in Westminster and/or Holyrood, it was not until the Scottish National Party (SNP) were in power that local MSP, Alex Salmond then First Minister and Keith Brown then Minister for Transport and Veterans announced on 10 February 2011 that tenders for design works to upgrade the Inveramsay Bridge have been given the go-ahead. There are 1.5 kilometres of new road leading to the bridge. SuDS is in place at either end of the new part of the A96 leading to the bridge. The old bridge is still usable for local access. There is an underpass on the A96 to the south of the bridge which connects the old A96 to Inveramsay.

== See also ==
- List of bridges in Scotland
