= Clyde Bridge =

Bridge in North Lanarkshire, Scotland

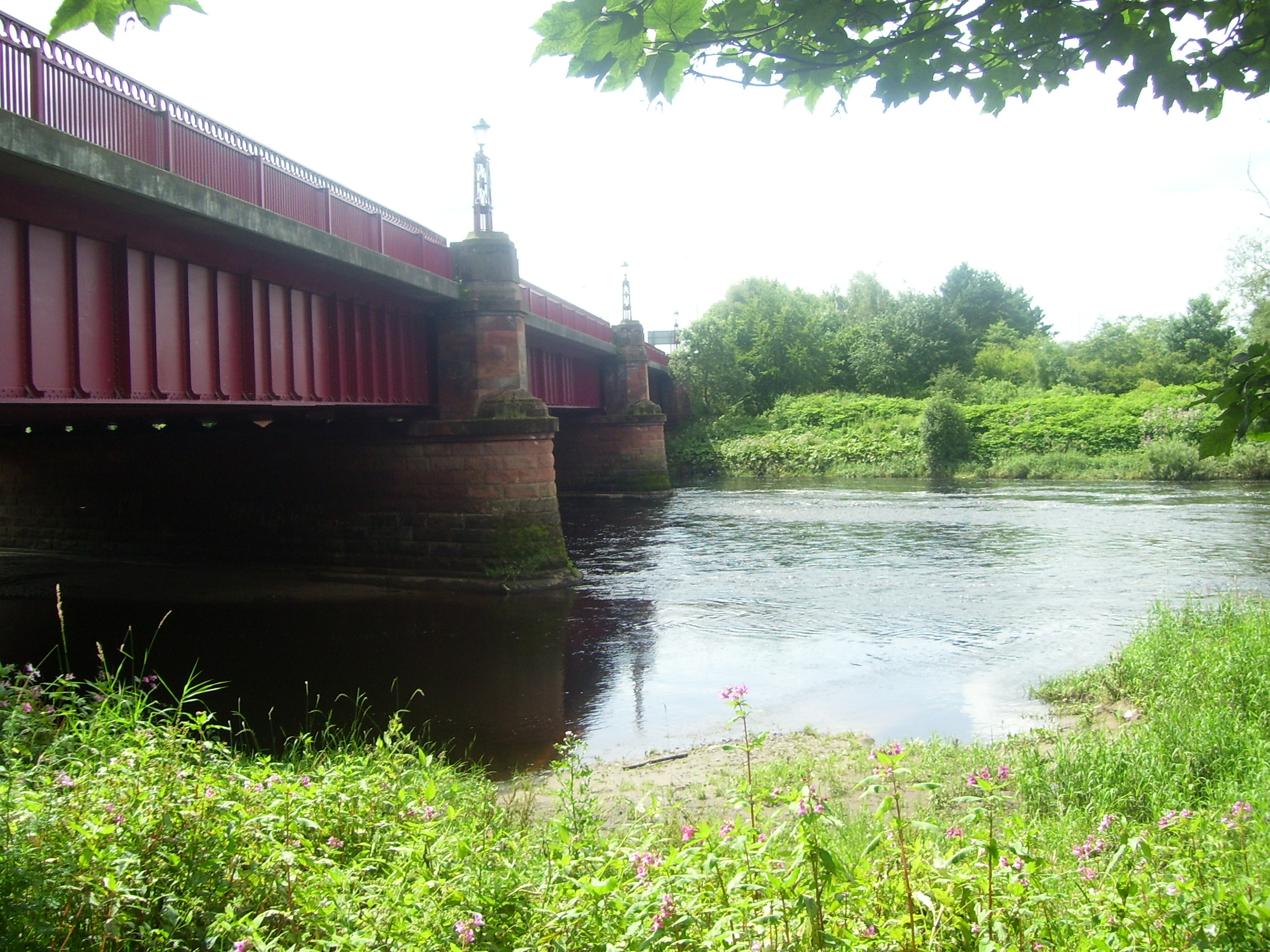
- Coordinates: 55.7830°N 4.0149°W
- Carries: A723
- Crosses: River Clyde
- Locale: North Lanarkshire

Characteristics
- Material: Steel

Location
- Interactive map of Clyde Bridge

Clyde Bridge, not to be confused with the similarly named Clyde's Bridge further upstream, is a road bridge built in 1932 spanning the River Clyde between Motherwell and Hamilton in Scotland. The bridge carries the A723 between the towns and also serves as access to a major interchange (Junction 6) of the M74 motorway. It replaced the earlier Hamilton Bridge nearby which had a different angle of crossing; remnants of its pillars can be seen in the river – most easily from the Clyde Bridge looking south – just downstream from the confluence with the Avon Water.

In 1953 a triumphal arch made of steel lattice grid manufactured by the local Motherwell Bridge Engineering Works was erected above the bridge on the Motherwell side to commemorate the Coronation of Elizabeth II. It was removed in 1969. In 2011, South Lanarkshire Council undertook a £38,000 renovation of the steel girder bridge to strengthen the underwater supports, following Government advice after several bridges were washed away in flooding.

== See also ==
- List of bridges in Scotland
