= Albert Bridge, Glasgow =

Road bridge that spans the River Clyde in Glasgow, Scotland

Albert Bridge
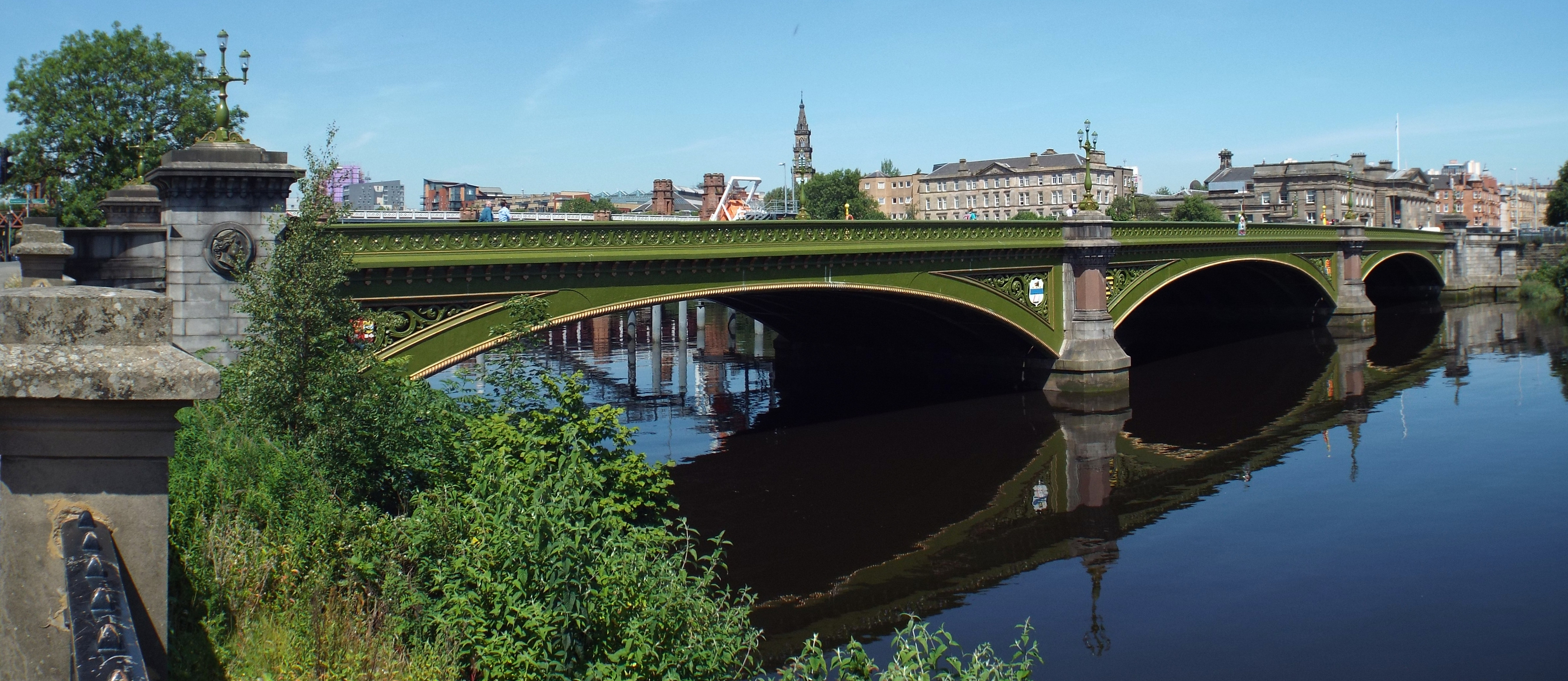
- Albert Bridge, looking towards the Justiciary Buildings and Hope House
- Coordinates: 55.8526°N 4.2473°W
- Carries: A8
- Crosses: River Clyde
- Locale: Glasgow

Characteristics
- Design: Arch
- Material: Cast-iron

Listed Building – Category A
- Official name: Clyde Street, Albert Bridge
- Designated: 21 March 1977
- Reference no.: LB32667

Location
- Interactive map of Albert Bridge

The Albert Bridge is a road bridge that spans the River Clyde in Glasgow, Scotland, near Glasgow Green. Opened in 1871, the bridge connects Saltmarket in the city centre with Crown Street on the city’s south side. It is category A listed structure, named in honor of Queen Victoria's consort, Prince Albert.

== Previous bridges ==
The current Albert Bridge is the fifth bridge constructed at this site in Glasgow. The first bridge, known as Hutcheson Bridge, was built in 1794 but was destroyed by flooding in 1795. The second bridge, built in 1803, was a timber footbridge. The third bridge, which replaced the second in 1834, was a masonry arch bridge designed by Robert Stevenson (grandfather of the author Robert Louis Stevenson).

Stevenson's bridge was demolished in 1868, and a temporary wooden bridge was erected in its place. This temporary structure was replaced by the current Albert Bridge in 1871.

== Construction ==
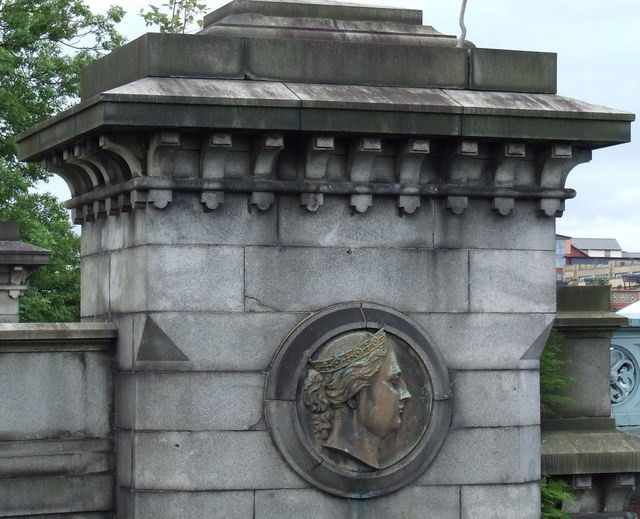
Queen Victoria medallion, Albert Bridge

Construction of the Albert Bridge was managed by a group of trustees, who examined the condition of the previous bridge and decided it should be completely removed, and replaced with one that would be more elegant and convenient. Initially, they set a budget of £39,000 and commissioned the Glasgow firm Bell & Miller Engineers to design the bridge. However, the initial design proved too expensive, with the lowest bid from builders being £54,000. Bell & Miller revised their design, leading to a bid of £48,000 from Hanna, Donald & Wilson of Paisley, Scotland, which was accepted.

The Albert Bridge is supported by concrete piers and abutments filled with cast iron caissons, sunk about 86 feet (26 metres) below water level. The designers rejected traditional masonry in favour of rivetted wrought iron elliptical arches. The largest of the arches spans 114 feet (35 metres). The arch ribs are adorned with cast iron spandrels decorated with the Royal coat of arms, Prince Albert, and the coats of arms of various corporate bodies. Stone pillars supporting the parapet are decorated with medallions of Queen Victoria and Prince Albert, crafted by Scottish sculptor George Edwin Ewing.

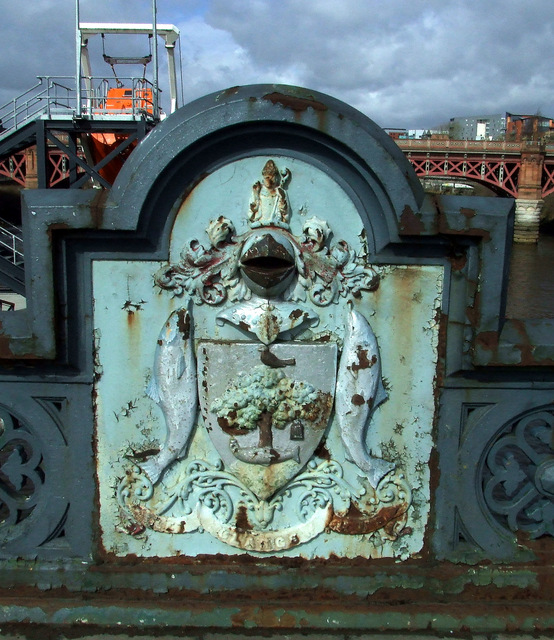
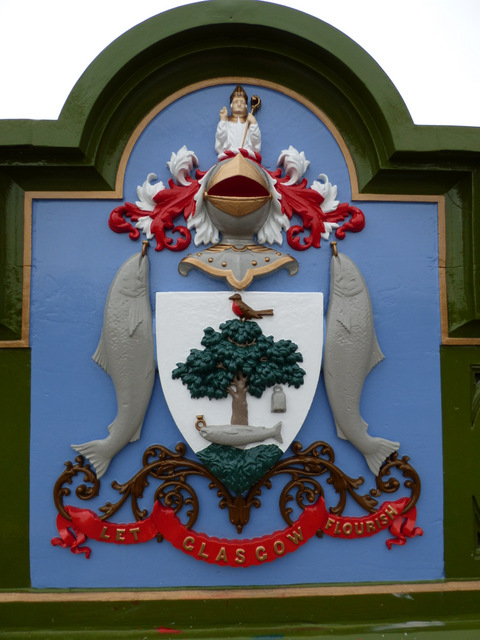
The coat of arms of Glasgow on the bridge before and after restoration.

The bridge carries a two-way, two-lane highway (the eastern branch of the A8 Highway) across the River Clyde and is supplemented by the Victoria Bridge, which is on the other side of the nearby railway bridge, and carries a one-way, northbound road across the river.

A £3.4 million refurbishment programme was launched in 2015, and given Royal recognition by a visit from the Earl of Wessex on 13 October 2016.

== See also ==
- List of bridges in Scotland

Next bridge upstream	River Clyde	Next bridge downstream
Pipe Bridge and Weir	Albert Bridge; Grid reference NS5941264444	City Union Bridge
