= Bow Bridge, Cumbria =

Medieval bridge in Cumbria, England

Coordinates: 54°7′59.8″N 3°11′22.2″W

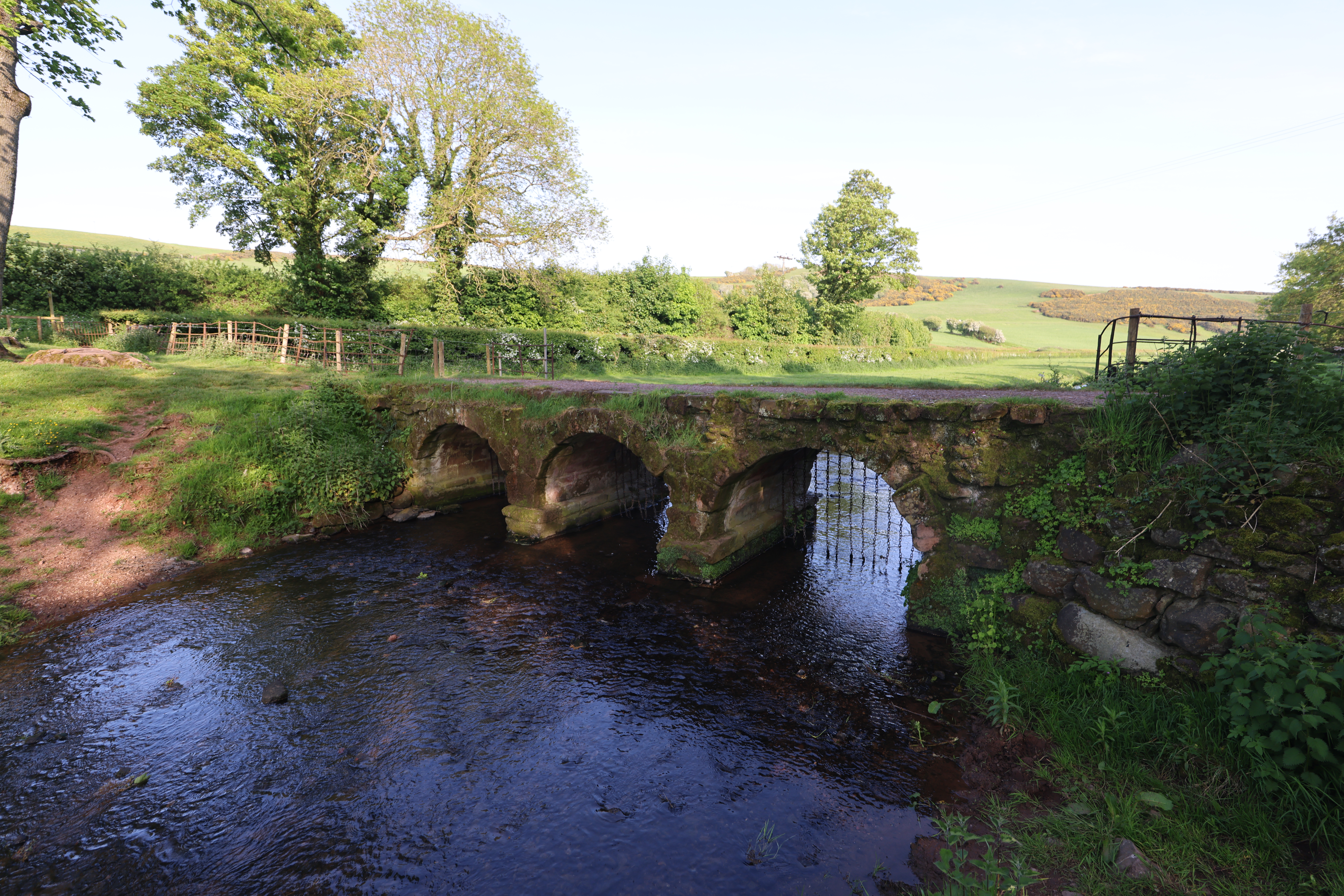
Bow Bridge

Bow Bridge is a late medieval multi-span bridge located near Furness Abbey in Cumbria and built in the 1500s. It is made of local red sandstone stone and crosses Mill Beck. It has been a Scheduled monument since 1949. Bow Bridge is a good example of a late medieval multi-span bridge and is a rare example in Cumbria of a bridge of this period. It was constructed by the monks of Furness Abbey to give access to their New Mill. After the Dissolution this mill fell into disuse and the bridge saw little traffic. As such it was never altered greatly and consequently survives well, displaying many of its original features.
