= Cambeck Bridge =

Hamlet in Cumbria, England

Coordinates: 54.956°N 2.767°W

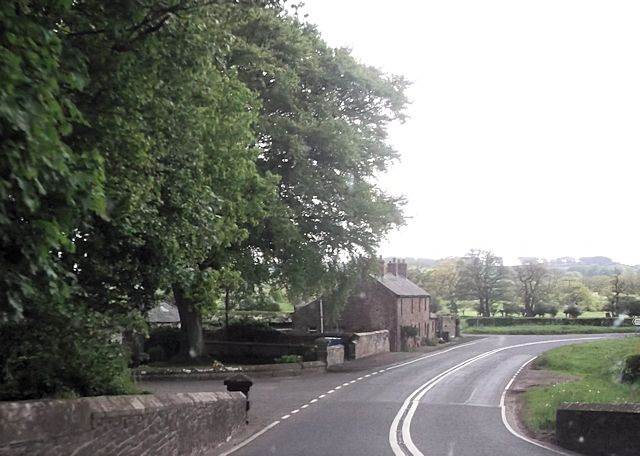
- A6071 east of Cambeck Bridge

- Location within Cumbria
- OS grid reference: NY508626
- Civil parish: Brampton; Walton
- Unitary authority: Cumberland
- Ceremonial county: Cumbria
- Region: North West
- Country: England
- Sovereign state: United Kingdom
- Post town: BRAMPTON
- Postcode district: CA8
- Dialling code: 016977
- Police: Cumbria
- Fire: Cumbria
- Ambulance: North West
- UK Parliament: Carlisle

Cambeck Bridge is a hamlet in Cumbria, England.

The bridge itself was built in the 19th century and spans the River Irthing. It is a Grade II listed building, listed in 1984.
