= Victoria Bridge, Glasgow =

Category A listed road bridge spanning the River Clyde in Glasgow, Scotland

Victoria Bridge
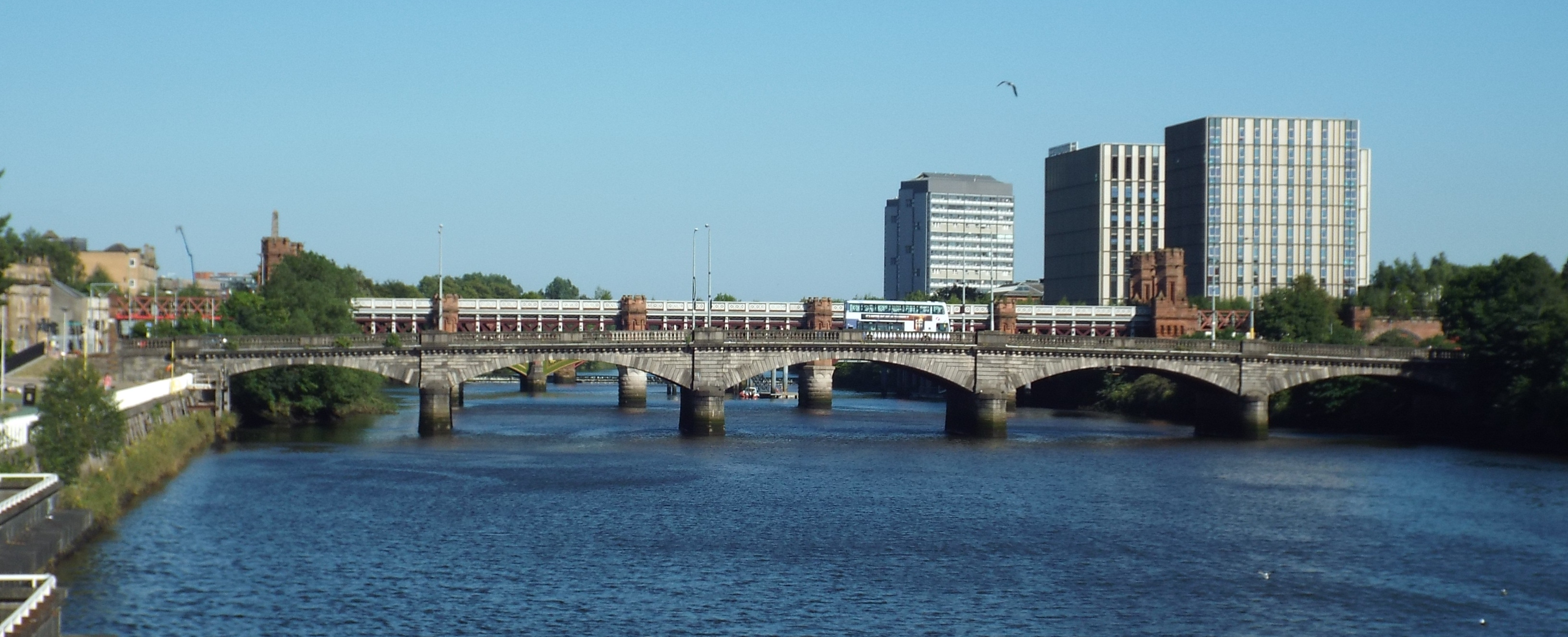
- Bridge crossing the River Clyde
- Coordinates: 55.8538°N 4.2512°W
- Carries: A8
- Crosses: River Clyde
- Locale: Glasgow

Listed Building – Category A
- Official name: Clyde Street, Victoria Bridge
- Designated: 14 December 1970
- Reference no.: LB32669

Location
- Interactive map of Victoria Bridge

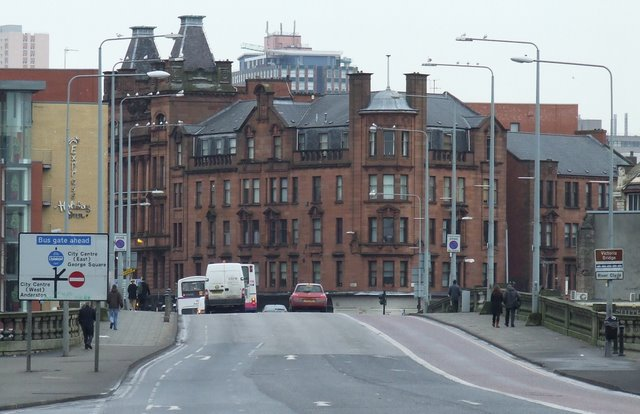
Looking over the bridge

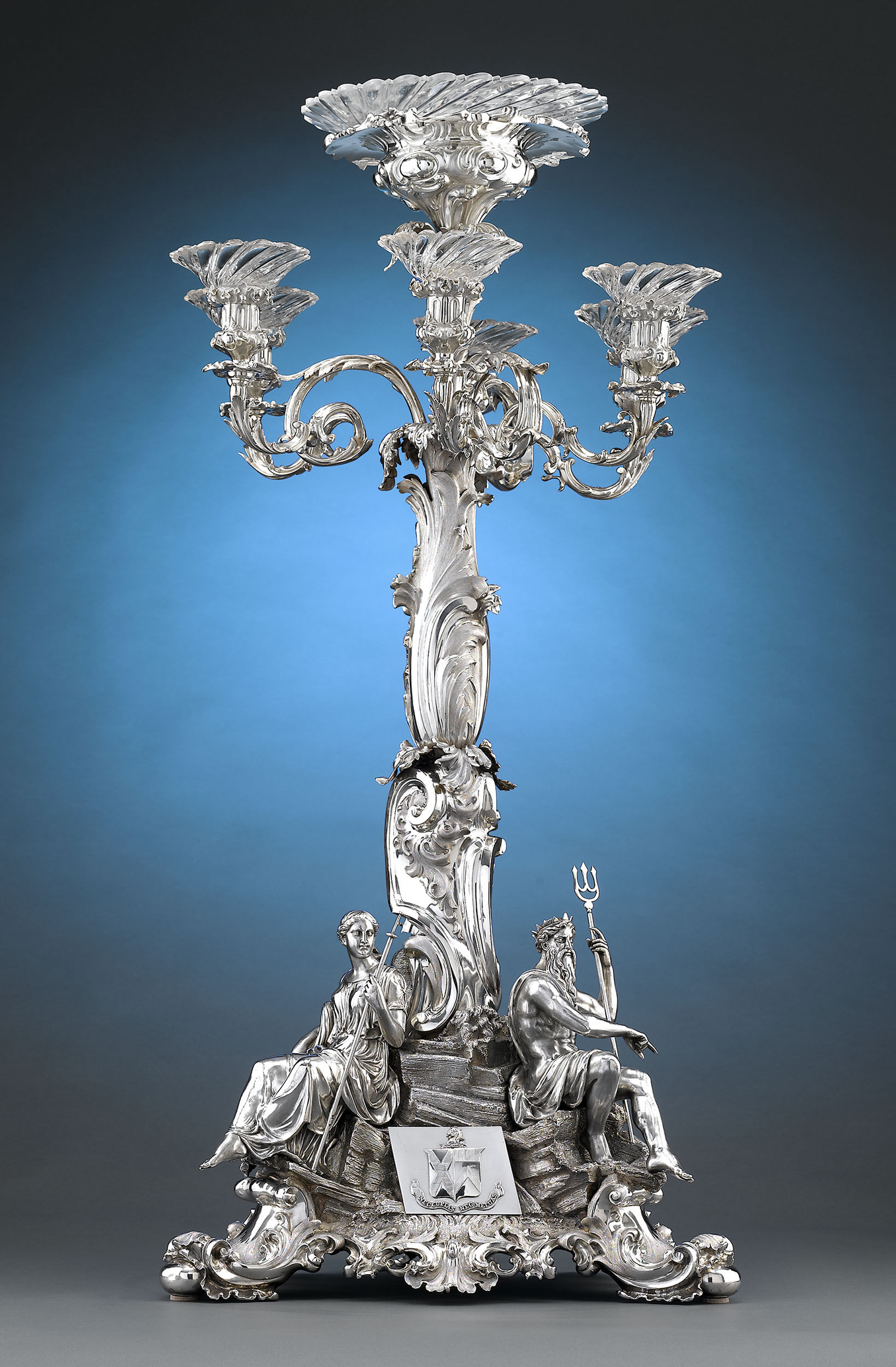
Victoria Bridge Silver Epergne gifted to builder William York, Esq. Hallmarked London, 1854

Victoria Bridge is a category A listed road bridge spanning the River Clyde in Glasgow, Scotland. Victoria Bridge is the oldest surviving bridge in Glasgow, lying at the foot of Stockwell Street in the city centre.

== History ==
Victoria Bridge is built on the site of the first recorded bridge over the Clyde; a timber bridge believed to exist in 1285 and described as "Glaskow bryg, that byggt was of tre" in Henry the Minstrel's epic poem on Sir William Wallace. In 1345 Bishop William Rae replaced the timber bridge with the Bishop's Bridge, located on the same site. Bishop's Bridge was originally 12 feet (3.7 m) wide, but was widened by 10 feet (3.0 m) in 1777.

By 1851 Glasgow's population had risen to 329,000 having doubled in the previous 25 years and the old bridge couldn't cope with current demands, and needed to be replaced.

== Construction ==
A new masonry arch bridge was designed by James Walker and constructed by William Scott, although some references name William York, Esquire as the builder. The bridge has five segmental arches which vary in span from 20.4 metres to the widest in the center, which measures 24.4 m wide. The construction replaced Bishop's bridge, with foundations six metres below those of the old bridge, and timber piles which were steam-driven a further four metres below that.

Named after Queen Victoria, when the bridge opened in 1854, Glasgow had one of the two widest bridges in Britain – London's widest at that time was only 54 feet (16 m).

The bridge is one way city-bound with two lanes. However, it also has a contraflow bus, cycle and taxi lane. It is complemented by the Albert Bridge on the other side of the railway bridge, which is also two-way.

As a numbered route, the bridge forms one arm of the A8, which then passes through the Bridgegate north of the river and meets the other arm from Albert Bridge at Saltmarket. The A814 (Clyde Street) begins at Saltmarket going west only, but becomes two-way after passing the north end of Victoria Bridge. Most traffic crossing the river here either feeds west onto the A814 or carries on north-easterly on the Bridgegate, as the road straight on (Stockwell Street) soon becomes a bus gate, with private vehicles only able to access a few local premises and car parks. South of the bridge, the designation becomes the A730 (Gorbals Street) which runs through the Gorbals district and on to Rutherglen (as mentioned above, it is a bus lane only at this point, with other southbound traffic using the nearby A728 Laurieston Road).

== See also ==
- List of bridges in Scotland
