= Boyne Bridge =

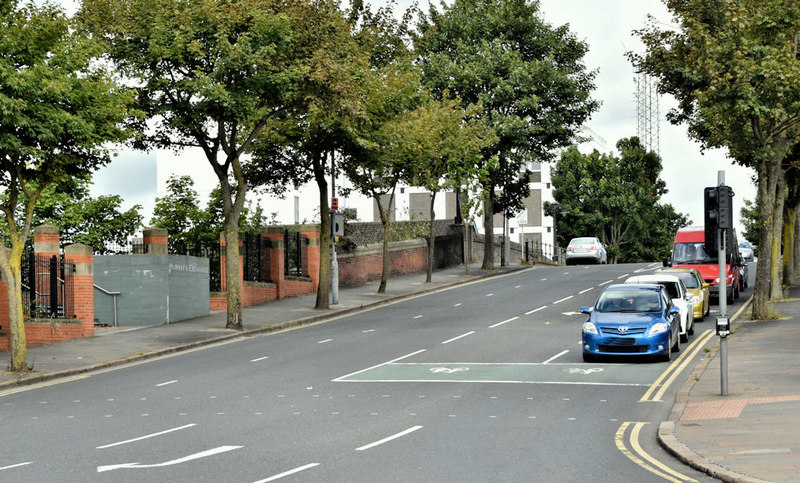
- Coordinates: 54°35′38″N 5°56′13″W
- Locale: Belfast, Northern Ireland
- Named for: Battle of the Boyne

History
- Built: 1863
- Rebuilt: 1936
- Demolished: 2025

Location
- Interactive map of Boyne Bridge

The Boyne Bridge was a bridge in Belfast, Northern Ireland. It was built in 1863 over the Belfast–Lisburn railway line, and was rebuilt in 1936. It was scheduled for demolition starting on 12 October 2024, to be replaced by a road at ground level, which is set to take one year to complete.

The older Saltwater Bridge stood nearby, on roughly the same alignment. This had been built in the 1640s over the Blackstaff River. Tradition holds that King William III crossed it in 1690 on his way to the Battle of the Boyne.

== History ==
The Blackstaff River (or Owenvarra) formerly flowed from west to east at the northern end of what is now Sandy Row. A bridge was built across the Blackstaff at this spot in 1611. It was rebuilt around 1642, becoming known as the Great Bridge or Brick Kiln Bridge, and eventually the Saltwater Bridge, to reflect the fact that the Blackstaff was tidal up to this point. Local tradition holds that in 1690, during the Williamite War in Ireland, King William III (William of Orange) crossed over the old bridge on his way south to the Battle of the Boyne. The bridge was extensively repaired in 1717.

In 1863, a new bridge was built over the Belfast–Lisburn railway line, to the north of the old river bridge. This new bridge became known as the Boyne Bridge.

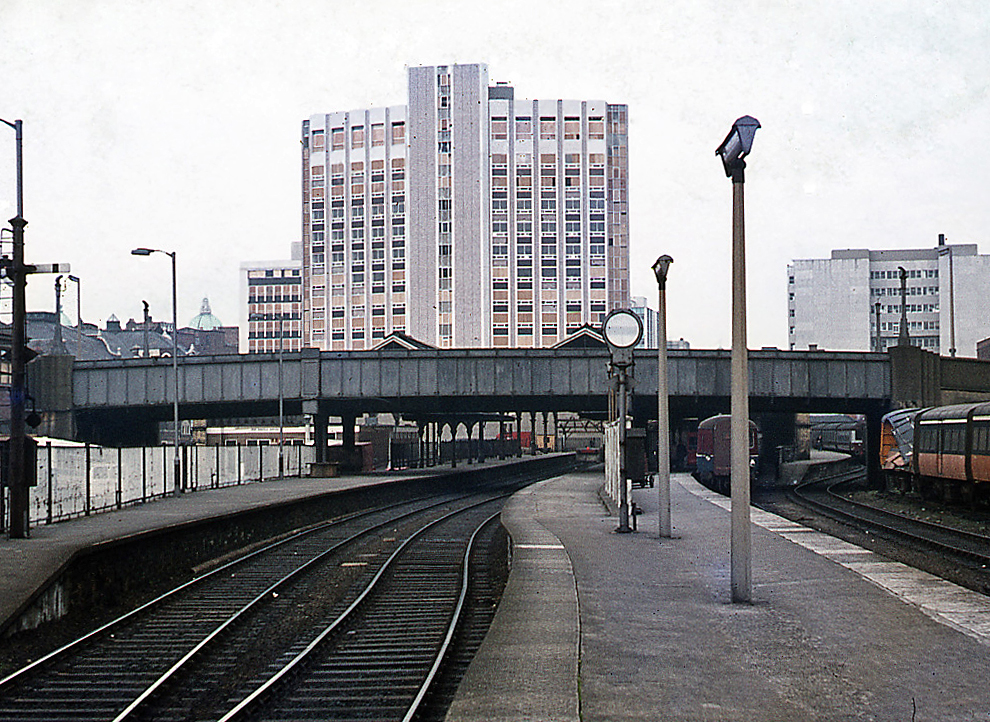
The Boyne Bridge in 1973, passing over the railway tracks and platforms at Great Victoria Street railway station.

In 1936, the Boyne Bridge was rebuilt, becoming wider and longer. The old Saltwater Bridge became part of the foundations of its approach road at the southern (Sandy Row) end. It was covered by a layer of gunite (sprayed concrete) and the new road built over it.

In 1990, the Blackstaff River was diverted and culverted, so that it no longer flowed under the former Saltwater Bridge. A later archaeological survey found that some stonework of the old Saltwater Bridge survived, buried 2–3 meters underneath the road surface, where Sandy Row meets the Boyne Bridge.

== Demolition ==
In 2017, Translink proposed to demolish the Boyne Bridge and replace it with a road at ground level, as part of redevelopment plans for the new Belfast Grand Central station. Translink argued that the bridge, which dates from the 1930s, does not cross over a street or river, and will no longer cross over a railway line when the new station is built. This was protested by local residents of Sandy Row on heritage grounds, citing the King William tradition. They requested the Boyne Bridge be refurbished or included in the new development, and proposed it be granted listed building status. The proposal to grant the bridge listed status failed as the Department for Communities ruled there was no specific architectural interest to list it. The decision to demolish the bridge was approved in 2019, though campaigners in 2021 requested a ministerial review. Demolition was scheduled for October 2024, with Translink stating the bridge would be "sensitively dismantled" and the new road built, which Translink says will take one year to finish.

However a day before demolition was due to begin, a request for an injunction to stop the demolition was lodged at the High Court by the Ulster Architectural Heritage Society. This came after Translink claimed that they would seek damages of £100,000 a week for any delays to the demolition. The legal challenge failed and demolition started on 12 October. In November, a protest was made in Sandy Row against the demolition.
