= Bow Bridge, Iwood =

Stone bridge in Somerset, England

Bow Bridge
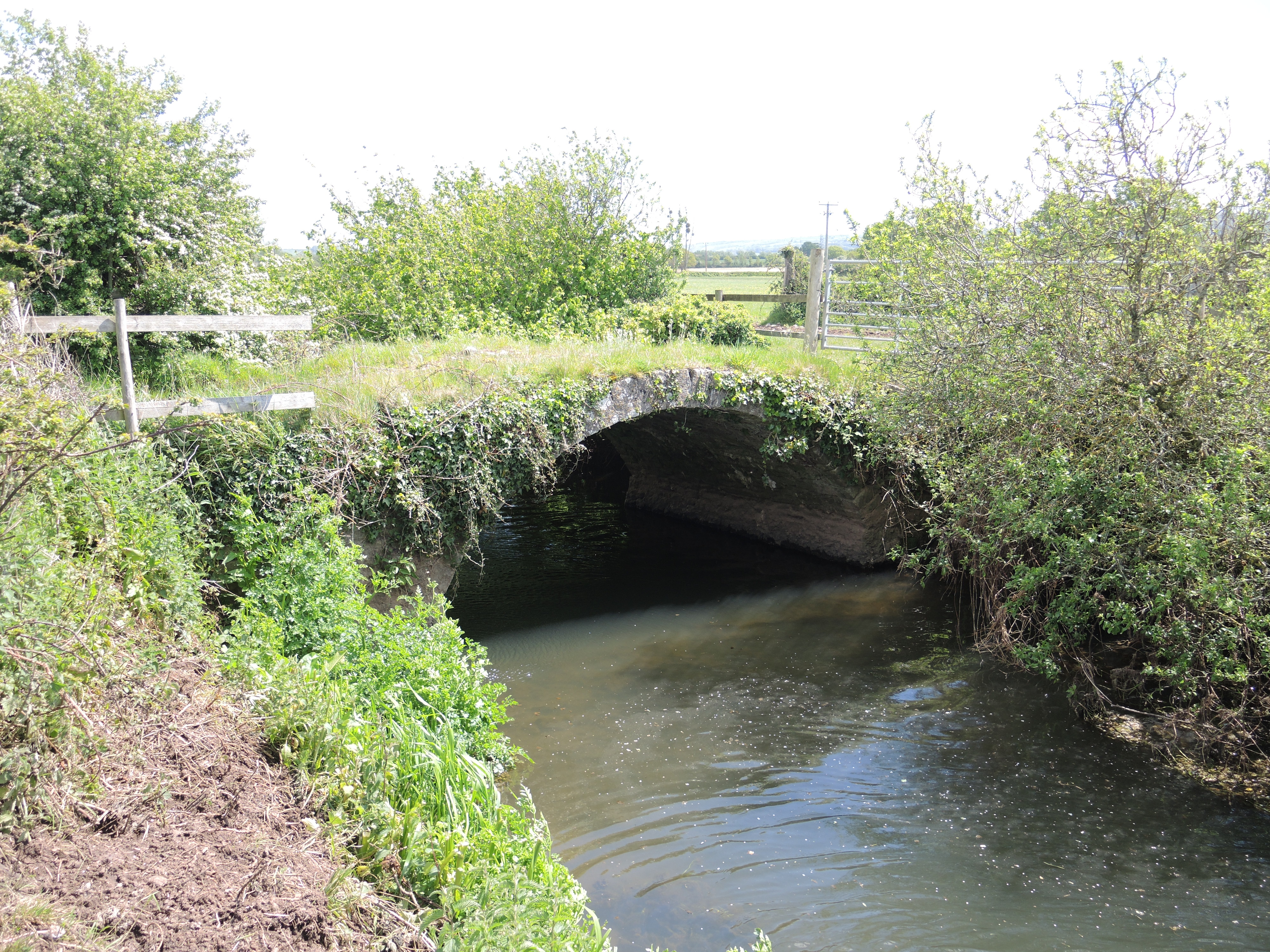
- Bow Bridge as seen from the north bank
- Coordinates: 51.364047°N 2.790557°W
- Crosses: Congresbury Yeo
- Locale: Iwood, Congresbury, North Somerset, England

Characteristics
- Design: Single-span arch bridge
- Longest span: 5.5 metres (18 feet)

History
- Built: c. 1810 – c. 1814

Listed Building – Grade II
- Official name: Bow Bridge over River Yeo
- Designated: 26 October 2007 (19 years ago)
- Reference no.: 1392284
- NSHER (Note: North Somerset Historic Environment Record.): MNS8828

Location
- Interactive map of Bow Bridge

Bow Bridge (/boʊ/) is a Grade II listed stone arched bridge, that crosses the Congresbury Yeo at Iwood, a hamlet of Congresbury in North Somerset. The bridge is largely intact and dates from the early 19th century. It is constructed from local stone with a single span arch of approximately 5.5 metres (18 feet). The single-coursed stone parapet is low in height and consists of a row of voussoirs and an unmetalled farm track. It is in close proximity to two other Grade II listed bridges to the east and southeast of Congresbury.

== Etymology ==
The name "Bow" is a cognate of the Welsh word bwa ([ˈbuː.a]) "arch", both being derived from the Old English boga, "bow" (as in bow and arrow) or "arch". In West Country dialect, a "bow" is a name for a stone arched bridge that spans a river or rhyne. A "bow" can also refer to a river abruptly changing course (as in oxbow lake).

== History ==
The bridge has been dated to the early 19th century but a more precise date has proved difficult to ascertain. Gradiometry and resistivity surveys at Iwood have found little evidence of mediaeval occupation. Furthermore, before 1814, there is an absence of cartography, apart from John Jacob de Wilstar's survey of lands for Queen Elizabeth's Hospital in 1739, that documented a limited number of land owners. However, the bridge does appear on the 1814 Congresbury enclosure map on lands held by Benjamin Thayer, a farmer at Iwood Farm, that had been occupied in the 18th century by James Wreach. In particular, the bridge is shown crossing Thayer's land north of the river at the River Ground (number 1586 on the 1839 tithe map), to pasture land on the south (number 1785 on the tithe map).

On 26 March 1810, Young Sturge and James Staples, the Commissioners of Enclosure for Congresbury, Wick St. Lawrence, and Puxton, invited tenders from builders and masons to build a bridge in the Great or New Moor, over the Congresbury Yeo. (Note: The Great, or North, Moor of Congresbury was common land until it was enclosed around 1813 and became known as the New Moor on the enclosure maps.) Edward Lukins, a mason at Yatton, won the tender, and together with Thayer, signed contracts with the commissioners on 23 April 1810. The contract value was £280 (equivalent to £19,000 in 2025), a substantial sum when compared to average agricultural wages at the time of around £30 per year. In total, the Congresbury enclosure improved, or caused to be built, 398 bridges and gates, at a cost of £1,314 (equivalent to £89,200 in 2025). These enclosure costs were a burden for many landowners as they often had to sell part of their land, and less commonly, mortgage other properties, to meet the expenses imposed by the commissioners. Thayer farmed the land around the bridge until his death on Christmas Day 1860, and on 20 February 1861, the farm and lands were sold at auction.

== Features and architecture ==
The bridge is constructed from local stone with a single span arch of approximately 5.5 metres (18 feet). The single-coursed stone parapet is low in height and consists of a row of voussoirs. An unmetalled farm track traverses the top of the bridge. On 26 October 2007, the bridge was designated as a Grade II listed building by Historic England as it is a "substantially intact late-C18 or early-C19 bridge over the River Yeo ... [and] possesses strong group value with other bridges of a similar date and style." The bridge can be reached from a public footpath running along the north bank of the Congresbury Yeo, in close proximity to two other Grade II listed bridges to the east and southeast of Congresbury, namely Collins Bridge and Bridge over River Yeo.

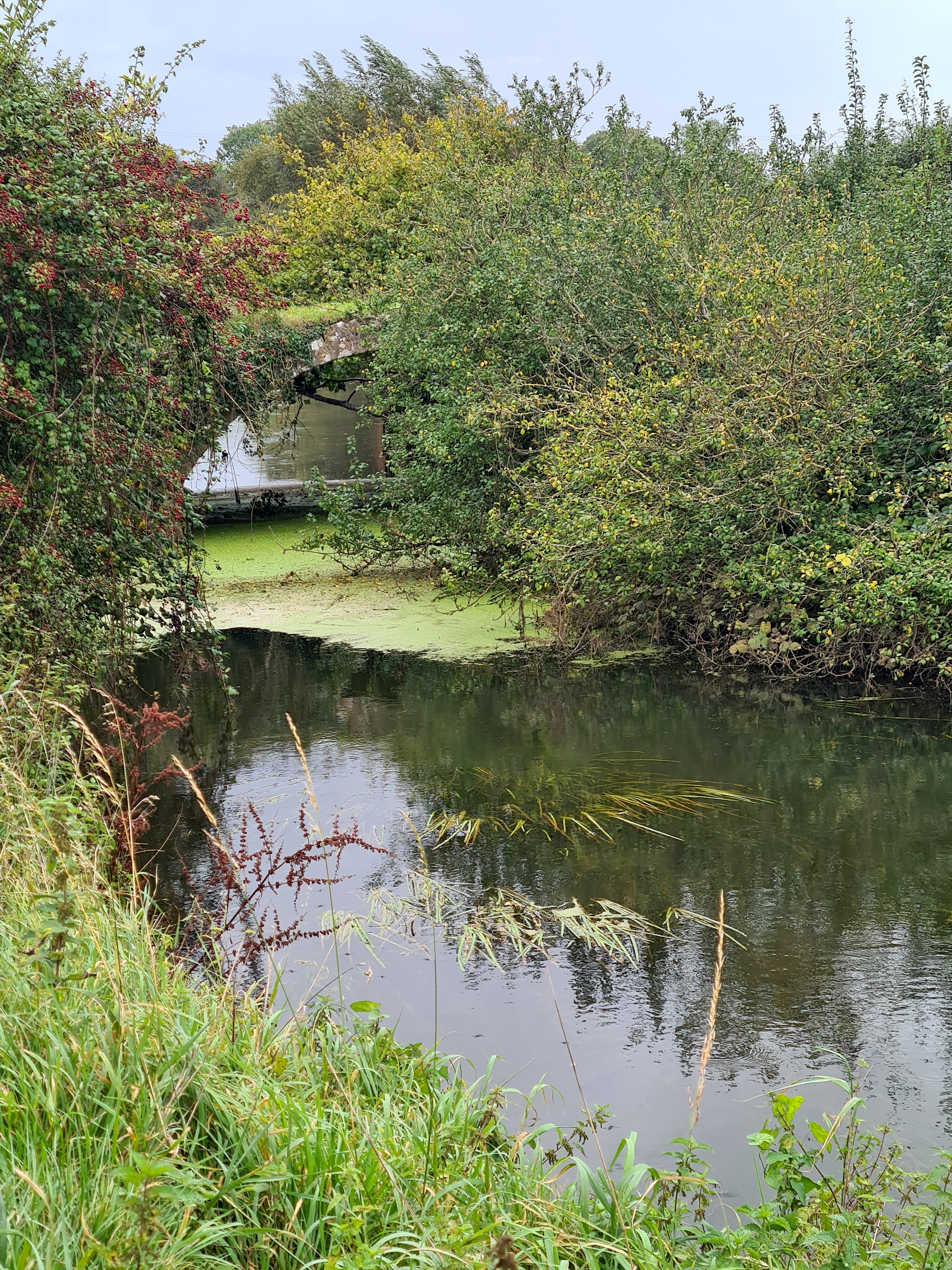
View from the north bank

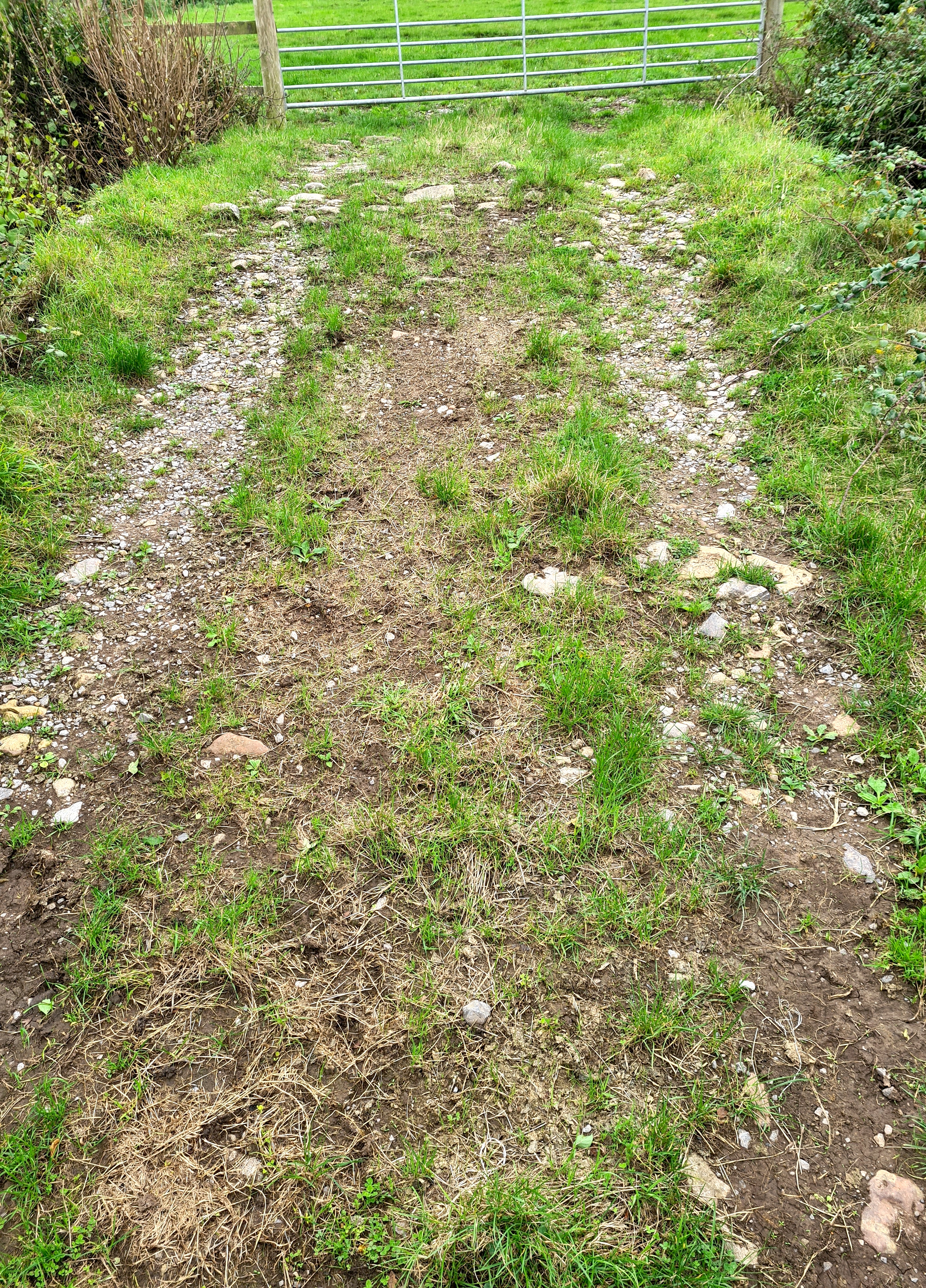
Unmetalled track

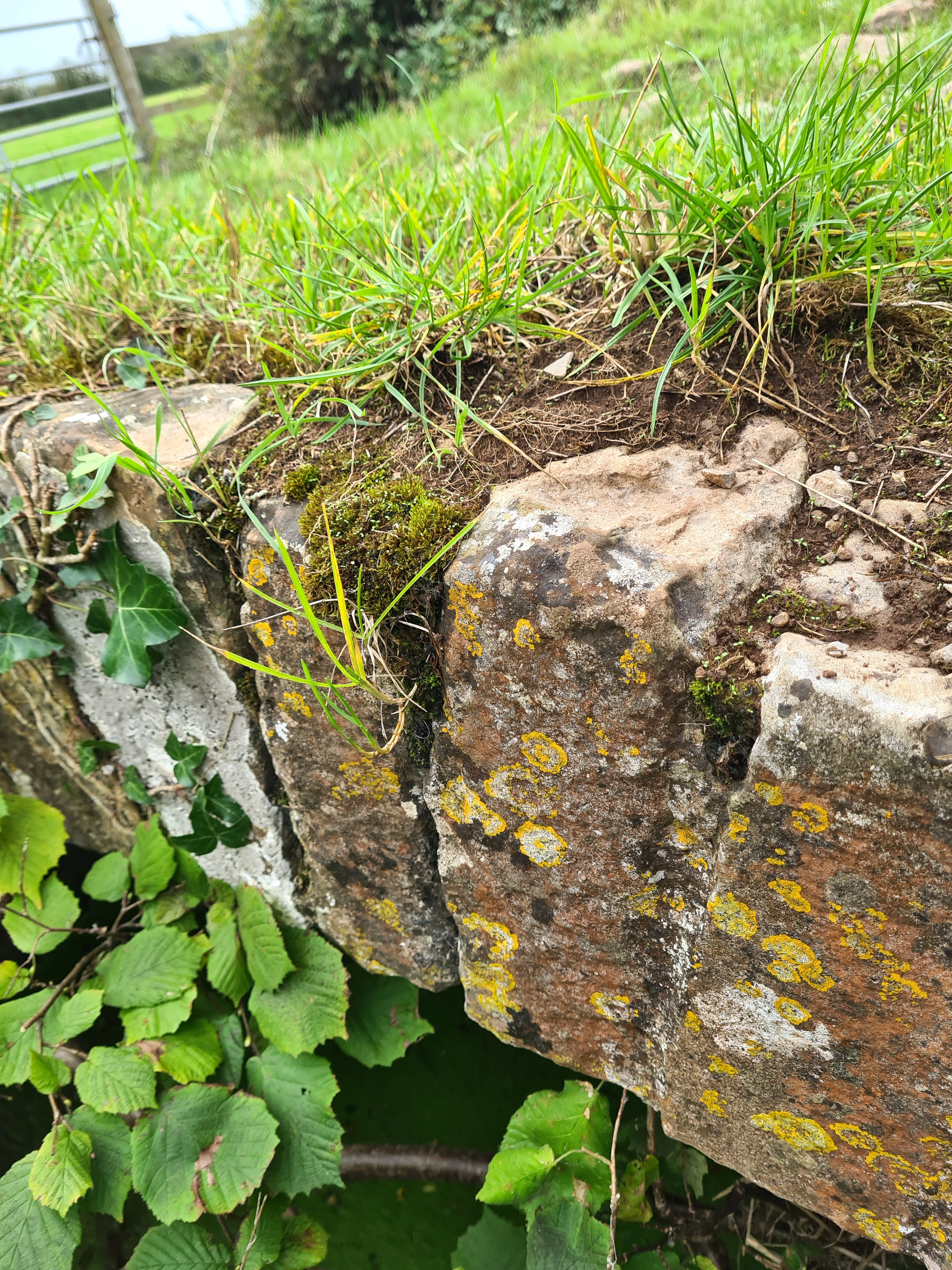
Voussoirs that make up the stone parapet

Bow Bridge over the Congresbury Yeo

== See also ==
- Avon Wildlife Trust
- Bow Bridge, Plox
- North Somerset Levels
