= List of crossings of the River Clyde =

== List of crossings of the River Clyde ==
Category	Heritage Status Criteria
A	Buildings of national or international importance, either architectural or historic, or fine little-altered examples of some particular period, style or building type.
B	Buildings of regional or more than local importance, or major examples of some particular period, style or building type which may have been altered.
C	Buildings of local importance, lesser examples of any period, style, or building type, as originally constructed or moderately altered; and simple traditional buildings which group well with others in categories A and B.

Crossing	Date	Coordinates	Heritage status	Locality	Notes	Photo
Railway Bridge		55.434°N 3.6483°W	-	Elvanfoot	West Coast Main Line	
Elvanfoot Suspension Bridge	1900	55.4411°N 3.6549°W	B	Elvanfoot		
Motorway Bridge		55.4467°N 3.6521°W	-	Elvanfoot	A74(M)	
Elvanfoot Bridge		55.4472°N 3.6503°W	-	Elvanfoot	B7076	
Crawford Footbridge		55.4713°N 3.6525°W	-	Crawford		
Camps Road Bridge		55.4736°N 3.6591°W	-	Crawford		
Railway Bridge		55.4731°N 3.6649°W	-	Crawford	West Coast Main Line	
Southwood Farm Access Bridge		55.4923°N 3.6891°W	-	Abington		
Clyde's Bridge	Early 19th Cent	55.5225°N 3.6786°W	B	Lamington		
Wandel Road Bridge		55.5227°N 3.6787°W	-	Lamington	A702	
Railway Bridge		55.5541°N 3.6351°W	-	Lamington	West Coast Main Line	
Lamington Bridge	1836	55.5552°N 3.6325°W	B	Lamington	B7055	
Wolfclyde Bridge		55.6093°N 3.559°W	-	Biggar	A72	
Thankerton Bridge	1778	55.6274°N 3.6237°W	B	Thankerton		
Railway Bridge		55.6801°N 3.6515°W	-	Carstairs	West Coast Main Line	
Minor Road Bridge		55.6825°N 3.6617°W	-	Carstairs		The upstream side of Clyde Bridge (geograph 6903050)
Hyndford Bridge	1773	55.6545°N 3.7262°W	A	Hyndford	A70 / A73	
Bonnington Weir	1925	55.6468°N 3.7737°W	A	Falls of Clyde		
Clydesholm Bridge	1699	55.6755°N 3.8005°W	A	Kirkfieldbank		
Kirkfieldbank Bridge	1959	55.6759°N 3.801°W	-	Kirkfieldbank	A72	
Stonebyres Weir and Footbridge		55.6762°N 3.8221°W	-	Lanark		
Stonebyres Power Station Bridge		55.6774°N 3.8314°W	-	Lanark		
Carfin Bridge		55.6937°N 3.8637°W	-	Clyde Valley Family Park	Wooden footbridge	
Crossford Bridge	1793	55.6975°N 3.8669°W	B	Crossford	B7056	
Milton Lockhart Bridge	Early 19th Cent	55.7187°N 3.8944°W	B	Dalserf		
Mauldslie Bridge	1861	55.7307°N 3.9068°W	A	Dalserf		
Garrion New Bridge	2002	55.7372°N 3.9226°W	-	Ashgill	A71 / A72 (westbound)	
Garrion Bridge	1817	55.7376°N 3.923°W	B	Ashgill	A71 / A72 (eastbound)	
Skellyton Bridge		55.7486°N 3.9352°W	-		Footbridge and pipe bridge	
Camp Viaduct	1862	55.7787°N 3.9989°W	-	Hamilton	Argyle Line	
Clyde Bridge	1932	55.7829°N 4.0148°W	-	Motherwell	A723	
Footbridge		55.7854°N 4.0265°W	-	Strathclyde Country Park		
Motorway Bridge		55.7968°N 4.0467°W	-	Hamilton	M74	
East Kilbride Expressway Bridge	1983	55.7963°N 4.0561°W	-	Hamilton	A725	
Bothwell Bridge	Early 17th Cent	55.7959°N 4.058°W	A	Bothwell	B7071	
Pipeline Bridge		55.7978°N 4.0823°W	-	Bothwell	no public access	
David Livingstone Memorial Footbridge	1999	55.802°N 4.0814°W	B	Blantyre		
Uddingston Footbridge	1989	55.8227°N 4.0955°W	-	Uddingston		
Uddingston Railway Viaduct	1848	55.8233°N 4.0958°W	A	Uddingston	Argyle Line; Shotts Line; West Coast Main Line	
Haughhead Bridge	1840	55.8293°N 4.1009°W	B	Uddingston	B758	
Pipeline Bridge		55.8325°N 4.1279°W	-	Daldowie	no public access	
Westburn Viaduct	1897	55.8282°N 4.1478°W	-	Carmyle	Glasgow Central Railway; Disused	
Clydeford Bridge	1976	55.8258°N 4.1646°W	-	Cambuslang	A763	
Cambuslang Footbridge	1977	55.8234°N 4.171°W	-	Cambuslang		
Rosebank Bridge	1892	55.8233°N 4.1712°W	-	Cambuslang	Disused; AKA Orion Bridge	
Bogleshole Bridge	1986	55.8305°N 4.1789°W	-	Cambuslang		
Clyde Viaduct	1865	55.8307°N 4.179°W	-	Cambuslang	Whifflet Line	
Auchenshuggle Bridge	2011	55.8359°N 4.1815°W	-	Rutherglen	M74	
Cuningar Loop Footbridge		55.8427°N 4.2065°W	-	Dalmarnock		
Dalmarnock Bridge	1891	55.8372°N 4.2095°W	B	Dalmarnock	A749	
Dalmarnock Railway Bridge	1897	55.8359°N 4.2153°W	-	Dalmarnock	Argyle Line	
Shawfield Footbridge		55.8385°N 4.2224°W	-	Dalmarnock		
Rutherglen Bridge	1896	55.8408°N 4.2276°W	-	Dalmarnock	A728	
Polmadie Footbridge	2018	55.8425°N 4.2353°W	-	Oatlands		
King's Bridge	1933	55.8468°N 4.2375°W	C	Gorbals	A74	
St Andrews Suspension Bridge	1855	55.8488°N 4.2384°W	A	Glasgow Green		
Tidal Weir	1852	55.852°N 4.2457°W	B	Glasgow Green	Includes Aqueduct (no public access)	
Albert Bridge	1871	55.8527°N 4.2473°W	A	Glasgow	A8	
City Union Bridge	1902	55.8532°N 4.2493°W	B	Glasgow	City Union Line	
Victoria Bridge	1854	55.8538°N 4.2511°W	A	Glasgow	A730; AKA Stockwell Bridge	
South Portland Street Suspension Bridge	1851	55.855°N 4.2555°W	A	Glasgow		
Glasgow Subway tunnel (east)	1896	55.8552°N 4.2565°W	-			
Glasgow Bridge	1899	55.8555°N 4.2579°W	B	Glasgow	A77 (southbound); AKA Broomielaw Bridge; Jamaica Bridge	
Caledonian Railway Bridge	1905	55.8556°N 4.2591°W	-	Glasgow Central Station	Ayrshire Coast Line; Cathcart Circle Lines; Glasgow South Western Line; Inverclyde Line; Paisley Canal Line; West Coast Main Line; Whifflet Line	
George V Bridge	1928	55.8557°N 4.2597°W	B	Glasgow	A77 (northbound)	
Tradeston Footbridge		55.8561°N 4.2637°W	-	Glasgow	AKA Squiggly Bridge	
Kingston Bridge	1970	55.8559°N 4.2702°W	C	Glasgow	M8	
Clyde Arc	2006	55.8571°N 4.2827°W	-	Glasgow	AKA Squinty Bridge	
Harbour Tunnel	1896	55.8574°N 4.2841°W	-	Glasgow	Disused	
Bell's Bridge	1988	55.8587°N 4.2892°W	-	Glasgow	Swing Footbridge	
Millennium Bridge	2002	55.8593°N 4.2923°W	-	Glasgow	Footbridge	
Govan-Partick Bridge	2024	55.8647°N 4.3090°W	-	Govan	Footbridge	
Glasgow Subway Tunnel (west)	1896	55.8657°N 4.3122°W	-	Govan		
Clyde Tunnel	1963	55.8687°N 4.3312°W	-	Whiteinch	A739	
Renfrew Bridge	2025	55.8891°N 4.393°W	-	Yoker	Dock Street	
Erskine Bridge	1971	55.9203°N 4.4627°W	A	Erskine	A898	
Gourock Ferry Terminal		55.9601°N 4.8144°W	-	Gourock	To Kilcreggan/Dunoon	
