= Glasgow Harbour Tunnel Rotundas =

Rotunda in Glasgow City, Scotland, UK

Coordinates: 55°51′30″N 4°16′59″W

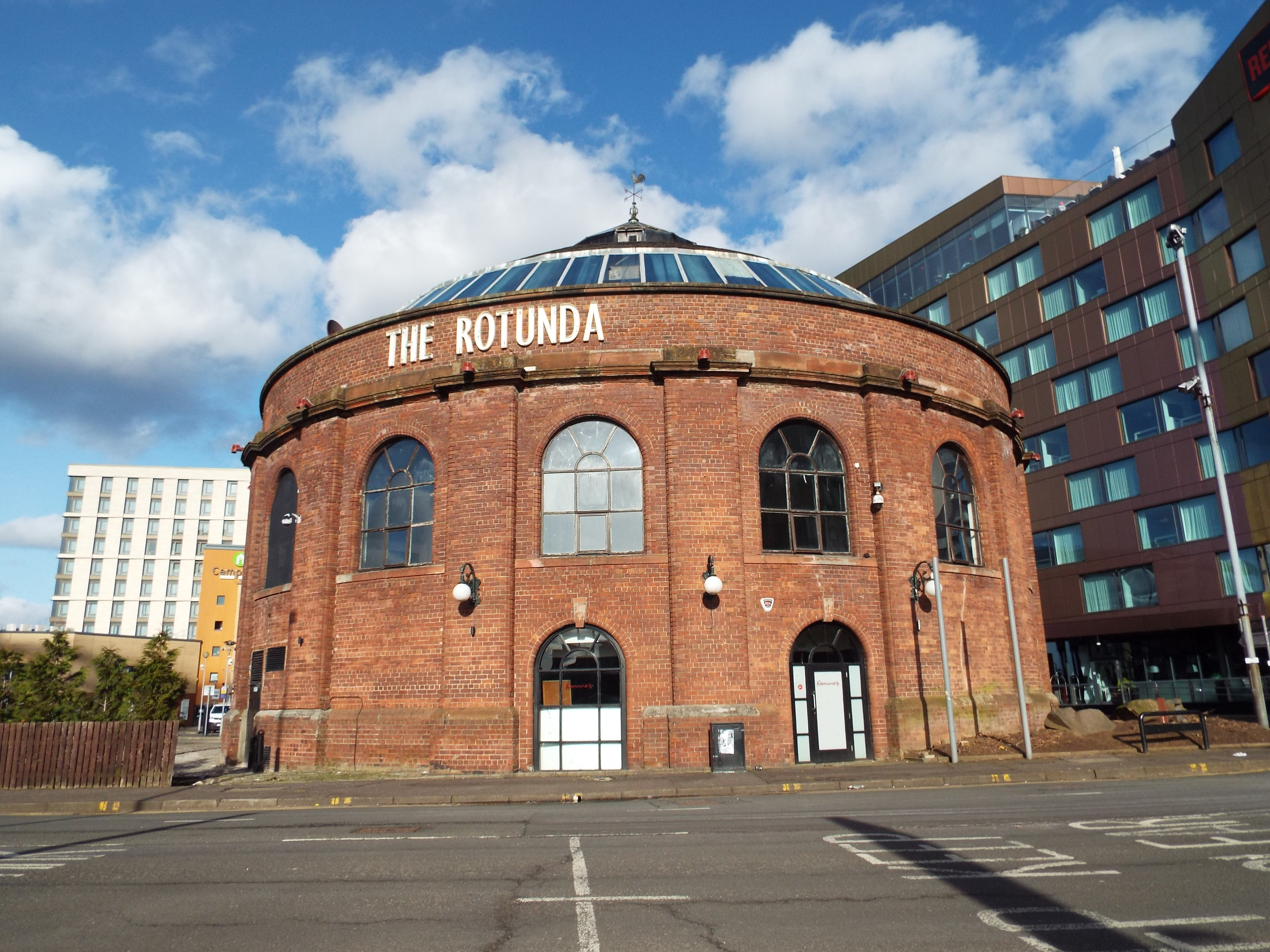
North Rotunda, viewed from immediately south (2024).

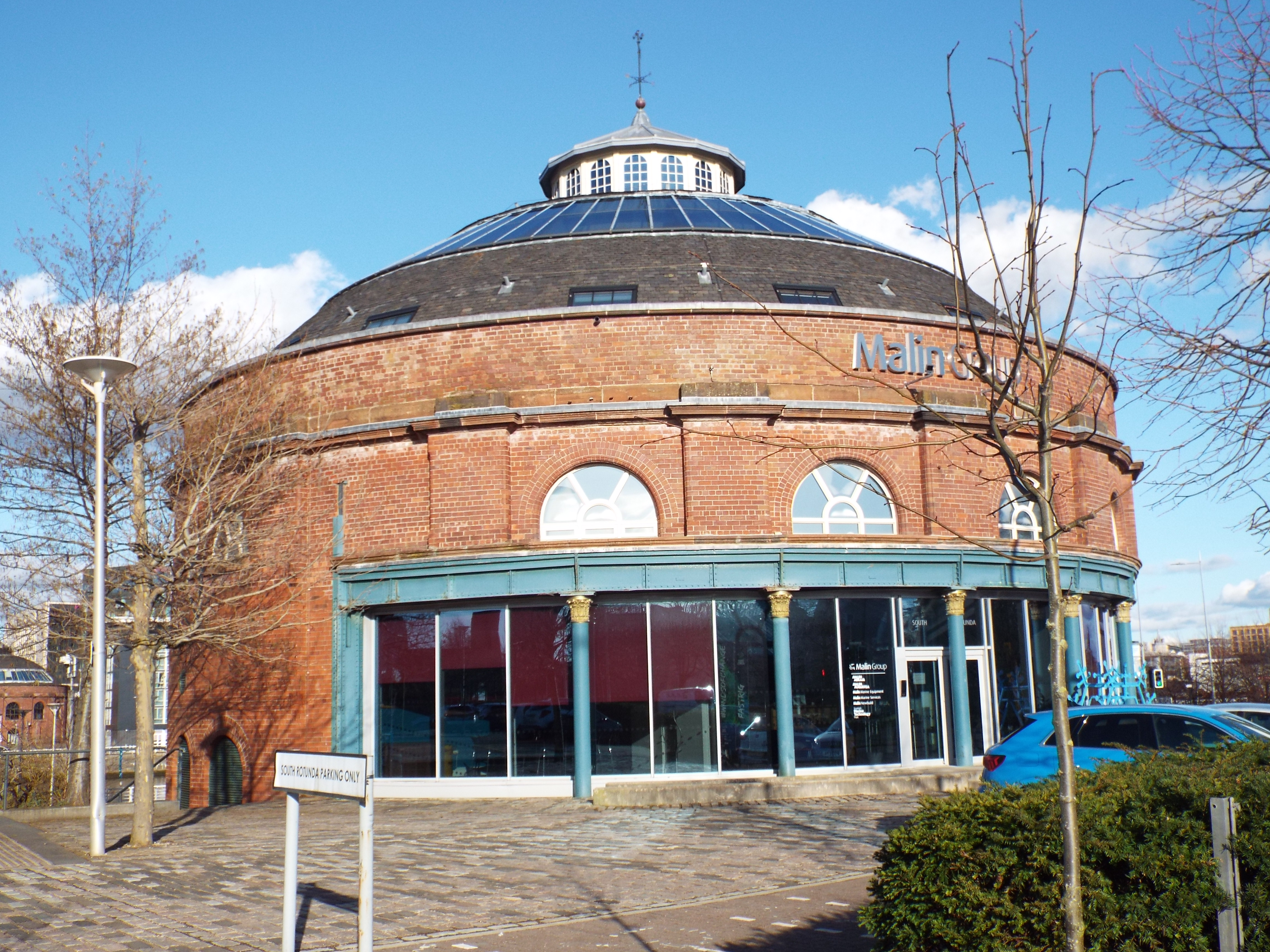
South Rotunda, viewed from immediately east (2024).

The Glasgow Harbour Tunnel Rotundas are two red brick stone rotundas which flank the River Clyde in Glasgow, Scotland. The North Rotunda is located on Tunnel Street in the Finnieston area of Glasgow with the South Rotunda at Plantation Place in Govan.

== History ==
Designed by Simpson and Wilson, and built between 1890 and 1896 by the Glasgow Harbour Tunnel Company, the Rotunda covered 24-metre-deep (79 ft) shafts to tunnels which enabled vehicular and pedestrian access to the other side of the river.

Pedestrians, horses and carts – and later motor vehicles – would be hauled up by hydraulic lifts provided by the Otis Elevator Company of New York.

The tunnels were expensive to run and were passed to the council to run as a service in 1926.

In 1938, the pedestrian tunnel was adapted to accommodate a water main.

During World War II they were initially used as safe passages for dockers and shipyard workers, but in 1943 the tunnels were temporarily closed because all the metal from the lifts was removed to contribute to the war effort.

The increased costs of running the tunnels which were prone to damp and the increase of motor cars on the roads led to the closure of the pedestrian tunnel in 1980, and the vehicular tunnels being filled in 1986. The pedestrian tunnel still exists, but is closed to the public.

Pedestrian and cycle passage across the river was reestablished in 1988 with the opening of Bell's Bridge 400 m (1/4 mi) downstream. The Clyde Arc road bridge opened in 2006 close to the site of the tunnels.

Originally, three-storey red and white brick towers stood alongside the rotundas, containing the hydraulic accumulators that powered the lifts, but these have been demolished.

== Other uses ==
Over the years, the Rotundas have served many functions including during the Glasgow Garden Festival in 1988 when one housed a replica of the famous Nardini’s ice cream parlour in Largs. The site has also served as a science centre, the "Dome of Discovery", which was funded by Glasgow City Council and BP Exploration to "celebrate the scientific and industrial culture of the city".

In 2014, the National Theatre of Scotland took over the South Rotunda, with "The Tin Forest" project, creating a pop-up arts venue for performance and visual art as part of Festival 2014, the Commonwealth Games strand of the Glasgow 2014 Cultural Programme.

== Current use ==
The North Rotunda was a restaurant known as Cranside Kitchen, and a wedding venue, however this closed in August 2023. The building has since been purchased and is being developed into an event space for the nearby Radisson RED hotel. The South Rotunda has been adapted as an office for a local shipping and marine engineering company.

The two rotundas are category B listed buildings.
