= Mauldslie Bridge =

Bridge in the South Lanarkshire, Scotland

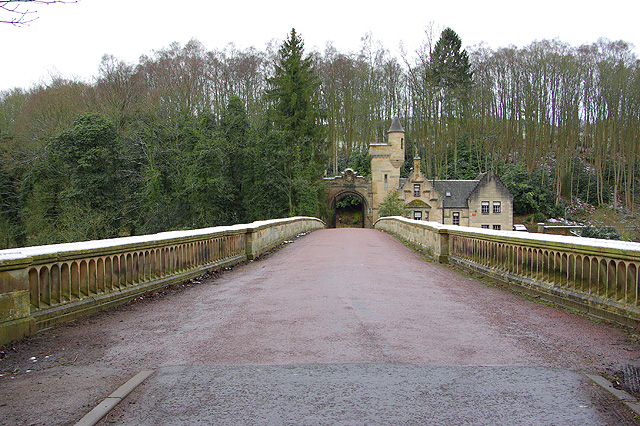
- The bridge in 2008, facing west
- Coordinates: 55.730784°N 3.90671°W
- Crosses: River Clyde
- Locale: South Lanarkshire

Characteristics
- Material: Sandstone

History
- Designer: David Bryce
- Opened: 1861 (165 years ago)

Listed Building – Category A
- Official name: Mauldslie Bridge, River Clyde
- Designated: 11 January 1971
- Reference no.: LB5175

Location
- Interactive map of Mauldslie Bridge

Mauldslie Bridge is a three-segmental-arch bridge in Dalserf, South Lanarkshire, Scotland. It crosses the River Clyde between the A72 road and the former location of Mauldslie Castle. Built in 1861, and now a Category A listed structure, the bridge is believed to be the work of David Bryce. Mauldslie Castle West Lodge and archway stands at the western end of the bridge. They are listed separately at Historic Environment Scotland.

The bridge was built for James Hozier, 2nd Baron Newlands, to serve Mauldslie Castle, built by the Thomas, 5th Earl of Hyndford, in 1793. The castle was demolished in 1935. A seated-dog motif above the gate, which appears with an inscription of "Aye Ready", can also be found in the garden of the Marna gate lodge, to the south. That also is a listed structure.

Winston Churchill has crossed the bridge, to attend gatherings of Scottish gentry.

Repairs began on the bridge in 2019, with the hope of preserving it for future generations.

== Bridge detail ==
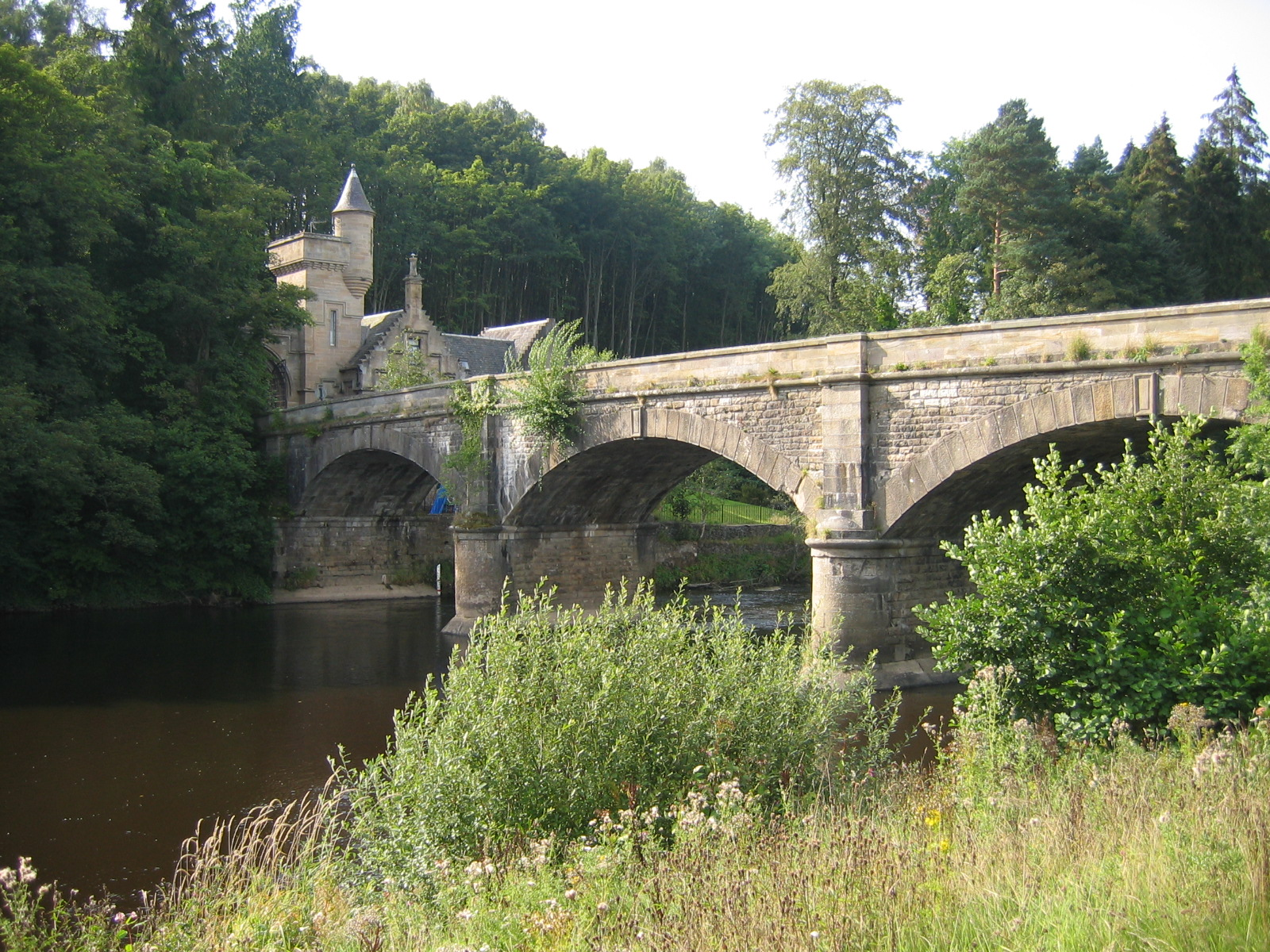
The River Clyde on the southern side of the bridge

== See also ==
- List of crossings of the River Clyde
- List of Category A listed buildings in South Lanarkshire
- List of listed buildings in Dalserf, South Lanarkshire
