= Baron Newlands =

Extinct barony in the Peerage of the United Kingdom

Escutcheon of the Barons Newlands

Baron Newlands, of Newlands and Barrofield in the County of the City of Glasgow and of Mauldslie Castle in the County of Lanark, was a title in the Peerage of the United Kingdom. It was created on 19 January 1898 for the soldier Sir William Hozier, 1st Baronet. He had already been created a baronet in the Baronetage of the United Kingdom on 12 June 1890.

He was succeeded by his only son James, the 2nd Baron, who had represented Lanarkshire South in the House of Commons from 1886 to 1906 and served as Lord-Lieutenant of Lanarkshire from 1915 to 1921. He was childless, and the titles became extinct on his death on 5 September 1929.

Sir Henry Montague Hozier (1838–1907), younger brother of the 1st Baron, was a Colonel in the 3rd Dragoons and the legal father of Clementine Churchill, wife of Winston Churchill.

== Barons Newlands (1898) ==
- William Wallace Hozier, 1st Baron Newlands (1825–1906)
- James Henry Cecil Hozier, 2nd Baron Newlands (1851–1929)

Baronetage of the United Kingdom
Preceded by Thompson baronets	Hozier baronets of Newlands and Mauldslie; 12 June 1890	Succeeded by Acland baronets
