= Henry Hozier =

British army officer and insurance secretary

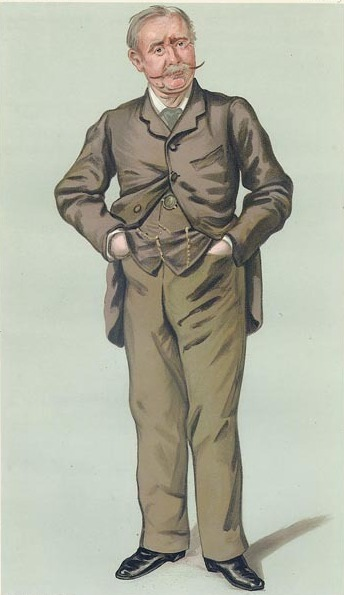
"Lloyhalp". Caricature by Jopling published in Vanity Fair in 1883

Colonel Sir Henry Montague Hozier, KCB (20 March 1838 – 28 February 1907) was a British Army officer who became secretary of Lloyd's of London. He was the father-in-law of Sir Winston Churchill, who married his daughter Clementine, though her paternity is doubted.

== Biography ==
Hozier was born at Bothwell, Lanarkshire, the third surviving son of James Hozier of Newlands and Mauldslie Castle, and Catherine Margaret Feilden, daughter of Sir William Feilden. His elder brother William Hozier was created a baronet in 1890 and raised to the peerage as Baron Newlands in 1898.

Hozier was educated at Rugby School, Edinburgh Academy, and the Royal Military Academy, Woolwich. He was successively lieutenant in the Royal Artillery, lieutenant in the 2nd Life Guards and captain in the 3rd Dragoon Guards, and passed first into and out of the Staff College, Camberley. He served with the Royal Artillery in the expedition to Peking, with the Prussian Army in the War of 1866, as assistant military secretary to Sir Robert Napier in the Abyssinian expedition, and as assistant military attaché during the Franco-Prussian War. He was awarded the Iron Cross for his service in the latter conflict, made a Companion of the Bath in 1897, and a Knight Commander of the Bath in 1903.

Upon his retirement from the military, Hozier shifted his interests to the world of business. In 1872 he joined the board of the newly formed Patent Cotton-Gunpowder Company. In 1874 he was elected secretary of Lloyd's where he remained for thirty-two years. His background in military intelligence undoubtedly led to his work to establish a network of signal stations. These Hozier describes in an interview in 1895 as follows: "[O]ne of the new features introduced here by myself, and that of which I am perhaps most proud, has been the development of our means of securing early information. We have established a complete network of signal stations at prominent points upon the sea-coast all the world over. We have placed them mostly on barren isolated spots where there are o shipping agents or newspaper reporters, but directly connected to by cable and wire." Hozier, now knighted, retired in 1906. He died while visiting the site of one such signal station in Panama.

Hozier's also served as colonel-commandant of the Royal Arsenal Artillery Volunteers. In Who's Who he gave his recreations as yachting, shooting and hunting. He was the author of The Seven Weeks' War, on the 1866 conflict, and a History of the British Expedition to Abyssinia. He lived at Stonehouse in Lanarkshire and 26A North Audley Street, London, and was a member of the Turf, Junior United Service, City and Beefsteak Clubs in London, the New Club, Edinburgh, the Western Club, Glasgow, and the Royal Northern, Royal Clyde and Temple Yacht Clubs.

== Marriage ==
In 1873, Hozier married Lady Blanche Ogilvy, daughter of David Ogilvy, 10th Earl of Airlie. Lady Blanche gave birth to four children, but their paternity has been questioned, due to Hozier's apparent sterility and poor relationship with his wife, who was known to have had affairs. Bertram Freeman-Mitford, 1st Baron Redesdale, who was married to Blanche's sister Lady Clementine, is considered the most likely candidate to be their biological father.

Lady Blanche's four children while married to Hozier were:

- Kitty Ogilvy Hozier (15 April 1883 – 5 March 1900), died unmarried
- Clementine Ogilvy Spencer-Churchill, Baroness Spencer-Churchill (1 April 1885 – 12 December 1977), wife of Sir Winston Churchill and life peer in her own right
- Lieutenant-Commander William James Ogilvy Hozier (2 April 1888 – 14 April 1921), Royal Navy officer; died by suicide, aged 33, unmarried, at the Hôtel d'Iéna in Paris
- Nellie Margaret Ogilvy Hozier (2 April 1888 – 2 February 1955), twin of James, married to Bertram Romilly, mother of Giles Romilly (1916–1967) and Esmond Romilly (1918–1941)
