= List of listed buildings in Dalserf, South Lanarkshire =

This is a list of listed buildings in the parish of Dalserf in South Lanarkshire, Scotland.

== List ==
Name	Location	Date Listed	Grid Ref. (Note: Sometimes known as OSGB36, the grid reference (where provided) is based on the British national grid reference system used by the Ordnance Survey. • "Guide to National Grid". Ordnance Survey. • "Get-a-map". Ordnance Survey.)	Geo-coordinates	Notes	LB Number (Note: Historic Environment Scotland assign a unique alphanumeric identifier to each designated site in Scotland, for listed buildings this always begins with "LB", for example "LB12345".)	Image
Larkhall, Church Street, St Machan's Church, Church Of Scotland, Including Hall, War Memorial, Boundary Walls, Gatepiers, Railings And Gates				55°44′14″N 3°58′17″W	Category B	45113	Upload Photo
Larkhall, 3-5 London Street, The Village Tavern				55°44′30″N 3°58′32″W	Category C(S)	45117	Upload Photo
Larkhall, 10 Margaret's Place, West Machan House				55°44′14″N 3°58′04″W	Category C(S)	45118	Upload Photo
Larkhall, 16 Raploch Street, Curly's Public House (Formerly Crossgate Public House)				55°44′28″N 3°58′33″W	Category C(S)	45121	Upload Photo
Larkhall, Union Street And King Street, Trinity Parish Church, Church Of Scotland, Including Gatepiers, Boundary Walls, Railings And Gates				55°44′20″N 3°58′26″W	Category B	45123	Upload Photo
Rosebank, 1 And 3 Lanark Road, Including Gatepiers And Railings				55°42′56″N 3°54′10″W	Category C(S)	90	Upload Photo
Overton Farm Cottage				55°42′59″N 3°53′30″W	Category C(S)	45126	Upload Photo
Rosebank, 18-30 (Even Nos) Lanark Road, Including Boundary Wall				55°43′34″N 3°54′11″W	Category B	6433	Upload Photo
Dalserf Village, 1, 3, And 5 Kirk Road				55°44′03″N 3°54′48″W	Category C(S)	5171	Upload Photo
Dalserf, Garrion Bridge, River Clyde				55°44′15″N 3°55′24″W	Category B	5172	Upload Photo
Larkhall, Avonbank Road, Avonbank House, Including Boundary Walls And Gatepier				55°44′16″N 3°59′13″W	Category C(S)	45110	Upload Photo
Larkhall, Caledonian Road, Larkhall Police Station, Including Former Fire Station, Boundary Walls Gatepiers And Railings				55°44′18″N 3°58′27″W	Category C(S)	45111	Upload Photo
Larkhall, Victoria Street And Percy Street, South Lanarkshire Council Offices, Including Boundary Walls, Gates, Gatepiers And Railings				55°44′29″N 3°58′17″W	Category C(S)	45124	Upload Photo
Larkhall, 76 Church Street, Dalveen, Including Gatepiers And Boundary Wall				55°44′06″N 3°58′15″W	Category C(S)	45112	Upload Photo
Mauldslie West Lodge, Gateway And Gates				55°43′51″N 3°54′26″W	Category A	45125	Upload another image
Rosebank, 21 Lanark Road, Including Boundary Wall And Railings				55°43′33″N 3°54′08″W	Category C(S)	5284	Upload Photo
Larkhall, Larkhall Viaduct				55°43′49″N 3°59′07″W	Category B	5168	Upload Photo
Dalserf Village, 4 Kirk Road				55°44′04″N 3°54′47″W	Category B	5169	Upload Photo
Larkhall, Duke Street, Larkhall Cemetery, Including Gates Gatepiers, Boundary Walls And Railings				55°44′42″N 3°58′03″W	Category C(S)	45114	Upload Photo
Larkhall, 51 Hamilton Street				55°44′42″N 3°58′32″W	Category C(S)	45116	Upload Photo
Rosebank, Lanark Road, The Popinjay Hotel, Including Gate, Gatepiers And Walls				55°43′35″N 3°54′09″W	Category B	5167	Upload Photo
Broomfield Road, Broomfield Farm, Including Enclosing Walls				55°42′20″N 3°56′01″W	Category B	45107	Upload Photo
Dalserf, The Orchard, Including Gatepiers, Part Boundary Walls And Railings				55°43′59″N 3°54′48″W	Category C(S)	45109	Upload Photo
Larkhall, Gallowhill Road, Robert Smillie Memorial Park Gates				55°44′08″N 3°58′23″W	Category B	45115	Upload Photo
Canderside Bridge, Cander Water				55°42′17″N 3°57′58″W	Category A	6452	Upload Photo
Dalserf Village, Dalserf Parish Church, Church Of Scotland, Including Walled Churchyard, Gatepiers And Gates				55°44′06″N 3°54′47″W	Category A	5170	Upload another image See more images
Mauldslie Bridge, River Clyde				55°43′51″N 3°54′24″W	Category A	5175	Upload another image
Ashgillhead, Ashgillhead Road, Rorison Memorial Church, Including Memorial Obelisk				55°43′48″N 3°56′04″W	Category C(S)	45106	Upload Photo
Dalserf, Lanark Road, Dalserf House Lodge, Including Boundary Walls, Gatepiers And Railings				55°43′59″N 3°54′40″W	Category C(S)	45108	Upload Photo
Larkhall, Raploch Road, St Mary's Rc Church				55°44′09″N 3°58′53″W	Category C(S)	45119	Upload Photo
Larkhall, Raploch Road, St Mary's Primary School, Including Gatepiers And Boundary Walls				55°44′08″N 3°58′56″W	Category C(S)	45120	Upload Photo
Larkhall, Union Street, Glengowan Primary School, Including Boundary Walls, Gatepiers And Railings				55°44′20″N 3°58′22″W	Category C(S)	45122	Upload Photo
Dalserf, Off Millburn Road, Auldton Farm, Including Gateway And Outbuildings				55°43′47″N 3°55′16″W	Category B	5173	Upload Photo
Dalserf, Millburn House, Including Gatepiers				55°43′54″N 3°55′06″W	Category B	5174	Upload Photo
Rosebank, Lanark Road, Marna, Including Boundary Wall				55°43′41″N 3°54′19″W	Category C(S)	5177	Upload Photo

== Key ==
The scheme for classifying buildings in Scotland is:

- Category A: "buildings of national or international importance, either architectural or historic; or fine, little-altered examples of some particular period, style or building type."
- Category B: "buildings of regional or more than local importance; or major examples of some particular period, style or building type, which may have been altered."
- Category C: "buildings of local importance; lesser examples of any period, style, or building type, as originally constructed or moderately altered; and simple traditional buildings which group well with other listed buildings."

In March 2016 there were 47,288 listed buildings in Scotland. Of these, 8% were Category A, and 50% were Category B, with the remaining 42% being Category C.
