= Macalloy =

UK based construction component manufacturer

Coordinates: 53.3735°N 1.2231°W

McCalls Special Products Ltd
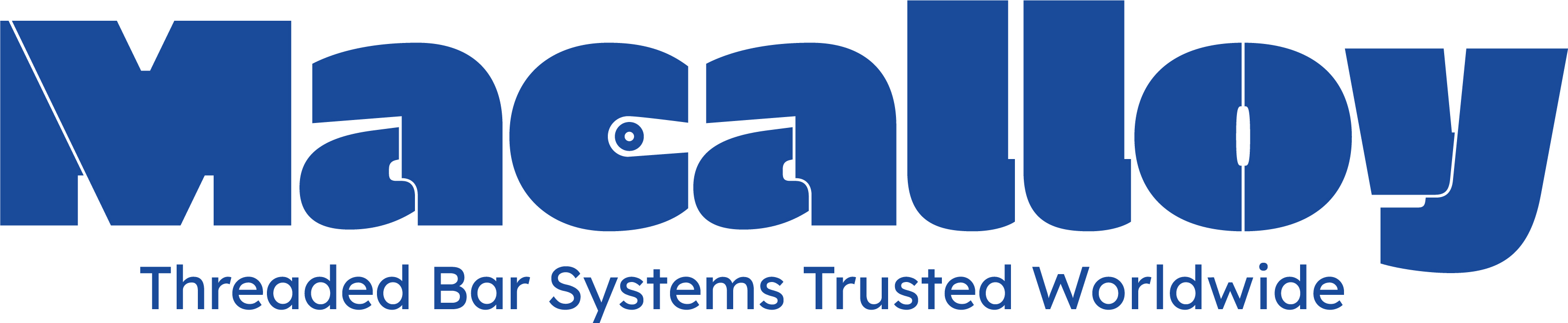
- Trade name: Macalloy
- Company type: Private company
- Industry: Construction
- Founded: 1921; 104 years ago in Sheffield
- Founder: T H McCall; Edwin Llwewllyn Raworth; C W Hamilton
- Headquarters: Dinnington, United Kingdom
- Area served: Worldwide
- Key people: Peter Hoy (Managing Director)
- Products: Tension Structures; Tie bars
- Revenue: ▲£10.7 million (2021); ▼£8.9 million (2020); ▲£11.1 million (2019)
- Net income: ▼£0.15 million (2021); ▼£0.18 million (2020); ▲£0.32 million (2019)
- Owner: Peter Hoy (2022)
- Number of employees: ▼65 (2021); ▲71 (2020); 70 (2019)
- Website: www.macalloy.com

McCalls Special Products Ltd is a British manufacturer of steel bar and cable components for tensioned concrete, ground anchors, curtain walling, and steel structures. It operates under the Macalloy brand and claims to be a world leader in that market.

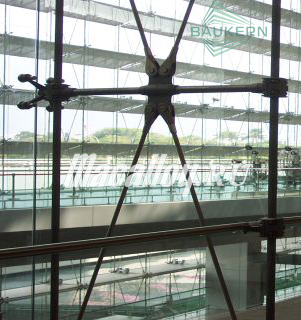
Macalloy struts, Changi Airport, 2003

Macalloy's work supports landmarks including the Sphere at the Academy Museum of Motion Pictures, VTB Stadium, Stade Roland Garros, Tottenham Hotspur Stadium, Soccer City Stadium, Marina Bay Sands, Jewel Changi Airport, Forth Road Bridge, and Burj Al Arab. As of 2021, 3/4 of the company's products are exported.

== History ==
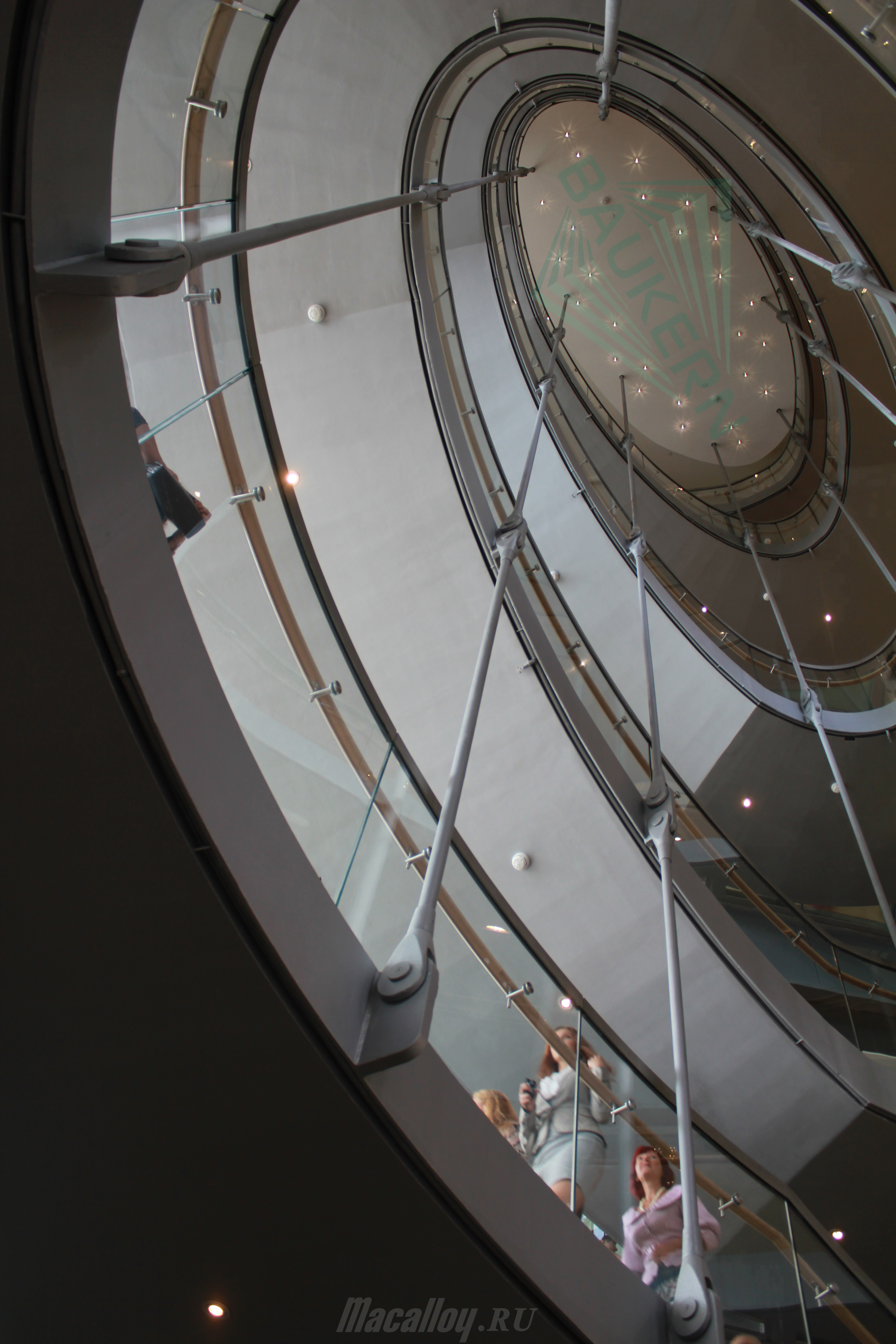
Macalloy struts, Mariinsky Theater, 2013

McCall and Company Ltd was founded in 1921 by T H McCall, Edwin Llwewllyn Raworth, and C W Hamilton, on Queens Street, Sheffield to supply steel rebar for concrete contractors.

In 1927, it moved to former railway engineering sheds on Nunnery Lane for two years then again to its steel supplier, United Bar Strip Mills' Templeborough Steelworks.

In 1948, the firm began to manufacture bars for post tensioned concrete. These were used to reinforce a 500 foot (150 m) central span of the 1960 M2 Medway Bridge, then the world's widest prestressed concrete span.

McCall and Company Ltd became a subsidiary of United Steel Companies Ltd in 1962 and three years later moved to Meadowhall Road, Rotherham. In 1966, United Steel Companies Ltd was nationalised as British Steel.

Allied Steel and Wire Ltd purchased McCall and Company Ltd in 1975, relocating it to Hawke Street as McCalls Special Products Ltd.

Allied Steel and Wire Ltd failed in 2002 and in 2003, a management team led by Peter Hoy purchased the assets of McCalls Special Products Ltd. A new Company was incorporated to continue the McCalls Special Products Ltd name and trade. In 2006, the business moved to the former Dinnington Colliery.

== Awards ==
McCalls Special Products Ltd was awarded a Queens Award for Export Achievement in 1996 and in 2010, a Queen's Award for Enterprise: International Trade (Export).

== Controversies ==
=== Clyde Arc Bridge ===
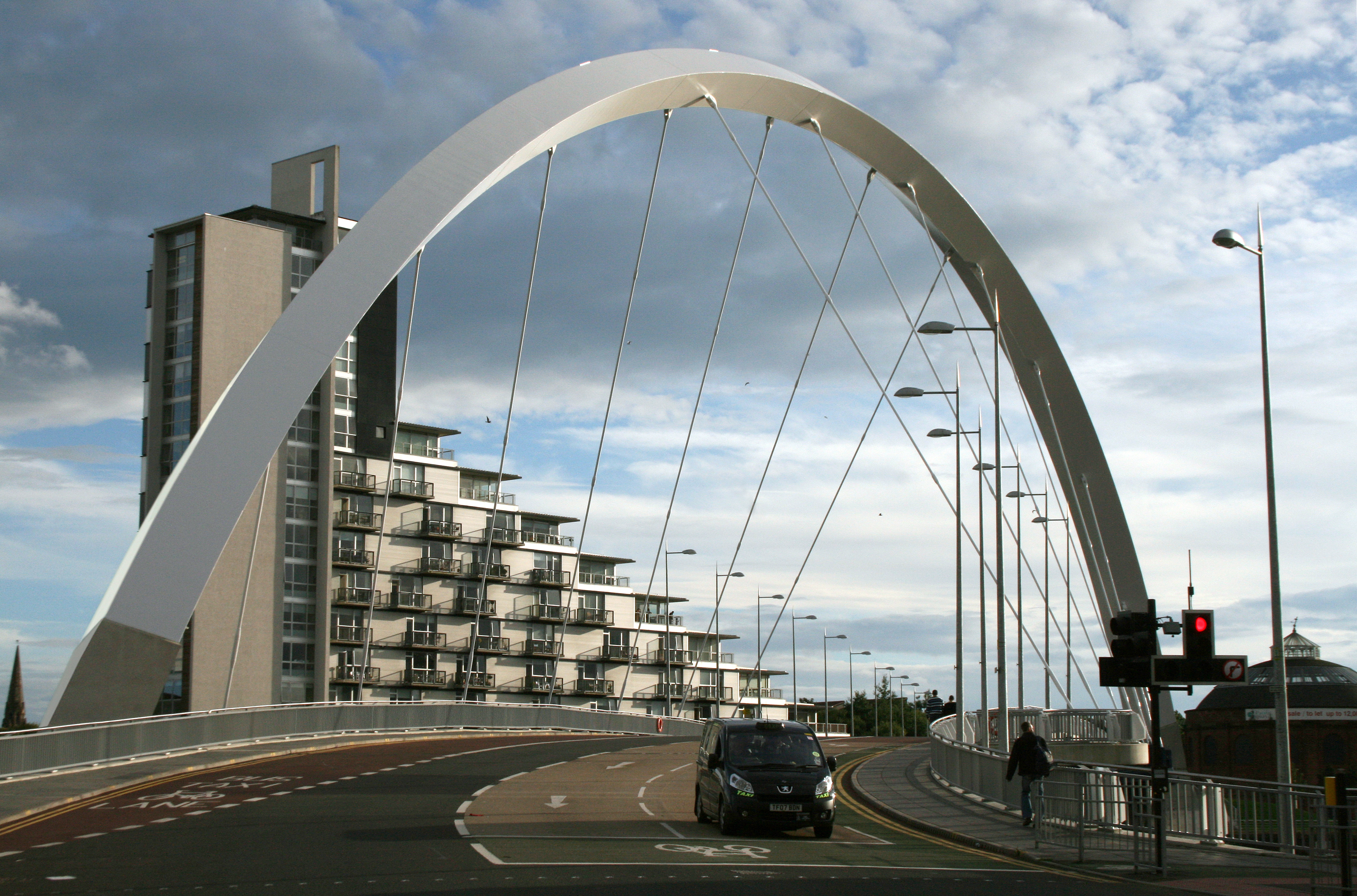
Clyde Arc Bridge

Severfield plc subsidiary Watson Steel Structures Ltd fabricated the Clyde Arc Bridge in 2007. It had to be closed in 2008 because a clevis connector failed and a 35 metre long tension bar fell onto the carriageway. Another clevis was found to be cracked and it was decided to replace all 14 tension bars in the structure. Watson Steel Structures Ltd claimed £1.8 million from Macalloy, the clevis supplier, alleging its product was faulty. Macalloy denied the claim and countered Watson Steel Structures Ltd had only specified minimum yield stress for the components.

=== Delhi footbridge collapse ===
Twenty seven workers were injured, five of them seriously, by the collapse of a footbridge to the Delhi Commonwealth Games Stadium. The 2010 collapse was highlighted by commentators questioning how ready Delhi was to host the Games.

Macalloy fabricated components of the 95 metre collapsed structure to a design provided by Tandon Consultants. The Government of Delhi opened an investigation and demanded explanations from Macalloy.

=== Fatal accident ===
In 2015, McCalls Special Products Ltd pleaded guilty to breaches of Section 2 and 3 of the Health and Safety at Work etc. Act 1974. It was fined £200,000 on each, to a total of £400,000, plus £16,804 in costs. The charges related to a 2013 fatality when the victim's clothes caught in a tape wrapping machine and he was dragged in, suffering crush injuries. Macalloy was criticised for inadequate machine guards and risk assessments.
