= William Hozier, 1st Baron Newlands =

Scottish businessman and peer (1825–1906)

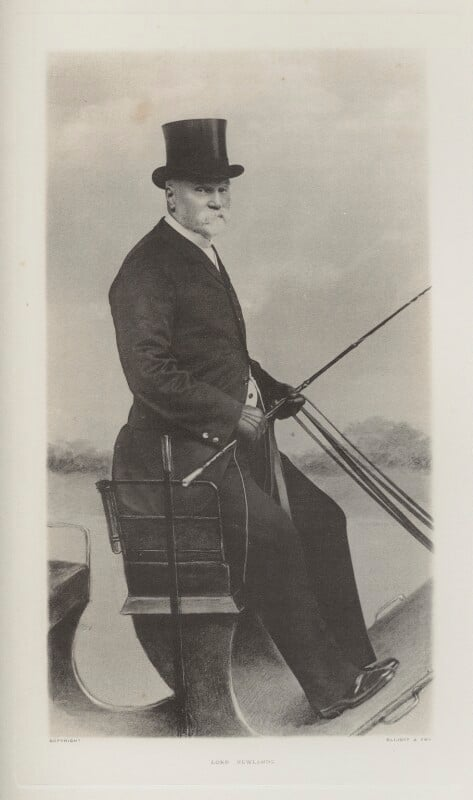
Newlands c. 1904

William Wallace Hozier, 1st Baron Newlands DL JP (24 February 1825 – 30 January 1906), known as Sir William Hozier, Bt, between 1890 and 1898, was a Scottish soldier and businessman.

== Background ==
Hozier was the son of James Hozier, of Mauldslie Castle and Newlands, Lanarkshire, and Catherine Margaret, daughter of Sir William Feilden, 1st Baronet. Sir Henry Montague Hozier, legal father of Clementine Churchill, was his younger brother.

== Career ==
Hozier served in the Royal Scots Greys and achieved the rank of lieutenant. He later became a captain in the Lanarkshire Regiment and a lieutenant-colonel in the 4th Battalion of the Lanarkshire Rifle Volunteers and the Auxiliary Forces. He was a director of Caledonian Railway Company as well as a justice of the peace for Glasgow and Argyll, a deputy lieutenant of Glasgow and vice-Lord-Lieutenant of Lanarkshire. He was created a Baronet, of Newlands and Mauldslie in the County of Lanark, in 1890 and raised to the peerage as Baron Newlands, of Newlands and Barrowfield in the county of the city of Glasgow and of Mauldslie Castle in the County of Lanark, in 1898. He is only recorded to have spoken once in the House of Lords, in June 1901.

== Family ==
Lord Newlands married Frances Anne, daughter of John O'Hara, in 1849. They had one son and three daughters. She died in January 1891. Newlands remained a widower until his death in January 1906, aged 80. He was succeeded in his titles by his only son, James. His youngest daughter, Mary Houghton Hozier, married Charles Cochrane-Baillie, 2nd Baron Lamington.

Baronetage of the United Kingdom
New creation	Baronet (of Newlands and Mauldslie); 1890 – 1906	Succeeded by James Henry Cecil Hozier
Peerage of the United Kingdom
New creation	Baron Newlands; 1898–1906	Succeeded by James Henry Cecil Hozier
