= Walter Menzies =

Sir Walter Menzies

Sir Walter Menzies (24 July 1856 – 26 October 1913) was a Liberal Party politician in Scotland who served as Member of Parliament (MP) for Southern Lanarkshire from 1906 to 1913.

He unsuccessfully contested the Glasgow Central constituency at the 1892 general election. He switched to the Southern Division of Lanarkshire for the 1900 election, a Conservative-Liberal marginal seat. He lost by 452 votes, but in the Liberal landslide at the 1906 election he won the seat with a majority of 1,275. He was re-elected at both the January 1910 and December 1910 elections, and held his seat in the House of Commons until his death in 1913, aged 57.

Parliament of the United Kingdom
Preceded by James Hozier	Member of Parliament for Southern Lanarkshire; 1906 – 1913	Succeeded by William Watson
