= Mauldslie Castle West Lodge =

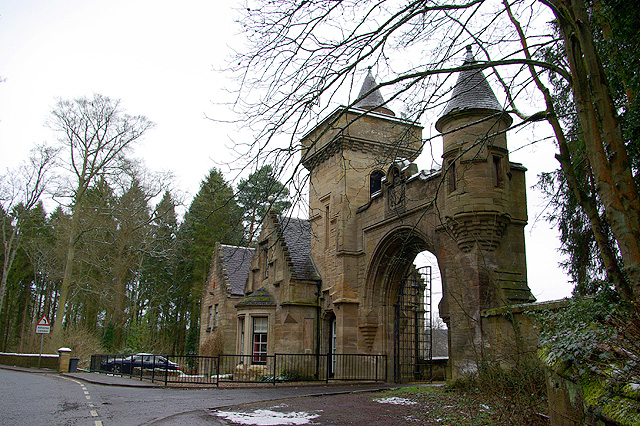
- The lodge in 2008, looking north

- Location of Mauldslie Castle West Lodge in South Lanarkshire
- 55.730713°N 3.90722°W
- Location: Dalserf, South Lanarkshire, Scotland

History
- Built: 1861 (165 years ago)
- Built for: James Hogier

Site notes
- Architect: David Bryce

Listed Building – Category A
- Designated: 12 January 1971
- Reference no.: LB45125

Mauldslie Castle West Lodge is a 19th-century gatehouse in Dalserf, South Lanarkshire, Scotland. A Category A listed building, it was completed in 1861, believed to be the work of David Bryce.

The adjoining Mauldslie Bridge, a separate listing, was built for James Hogier, of Newlands, to serve Mauldslie Castle, built by Thomas, 5th Earl of Hyndford, in 1793. The castle was demolished in 1935. A seated-dog motif above the gate, which appears with an inscription of "Aye Ready", can also be found in the garden of the Marna gate lodge, to the south. That also is a listed structure.

Hogier's initials appear on the eastern elevation of the gatehouse.

== See also ==
- List of listed buildings in Dalserf, South Lanarkshire
