= Hulme Arch Bridge =

Bridge in Hulme, Manchester, England

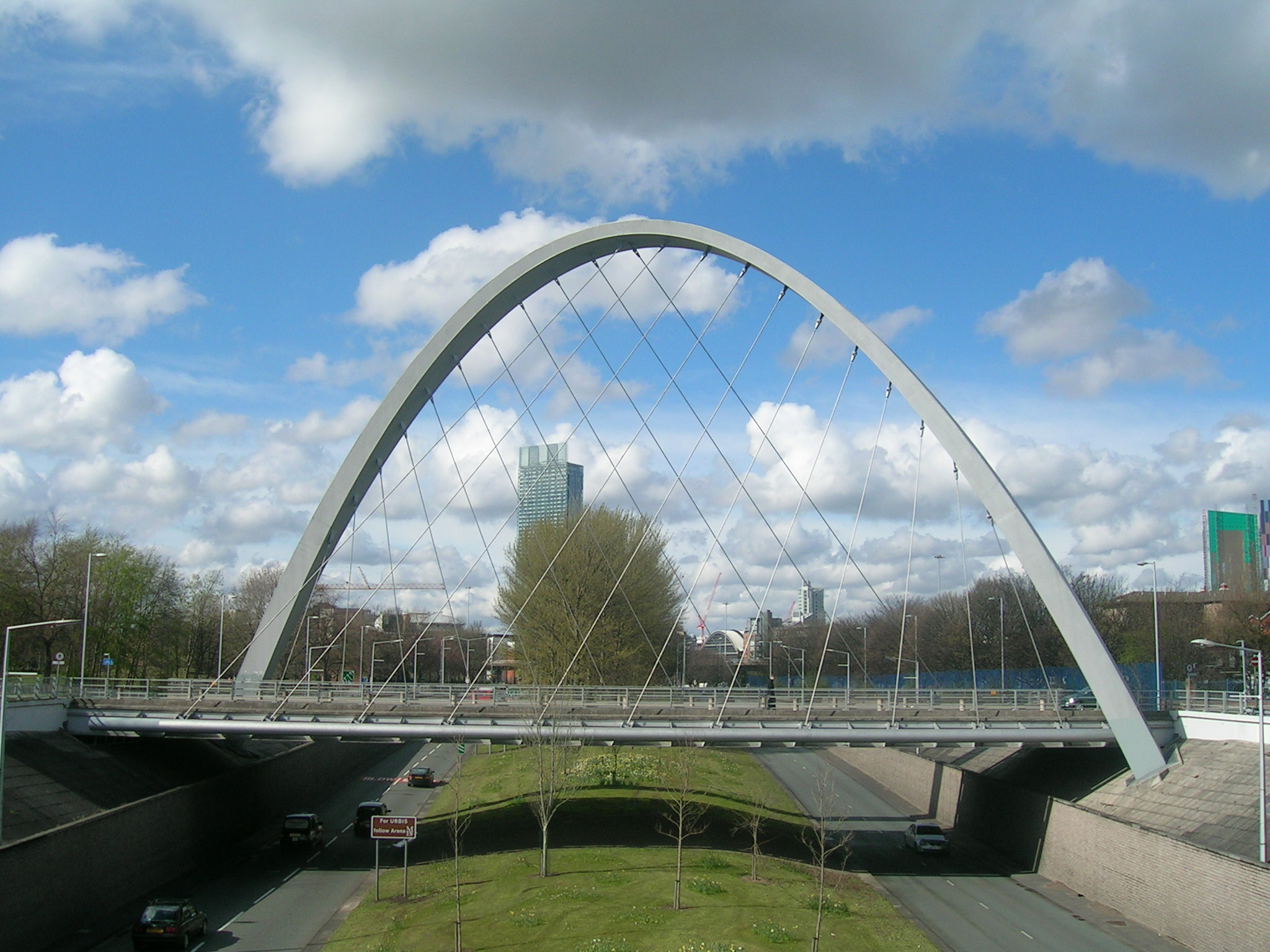
- Hulme Arch Bridge
- Coordinates: 53°28′05″N 2°14′45″W
- Carries: vehicular traffic
- Crosses: Princess Road
- Locale: Hulme, Manchester, England
- Owner: Manchester City Council

Characteristics
- Design: arch bridge with a suspended deck
- Material: 365 tonnes (359 long tons; 402 short tons) steel
- Total length: 52 metres (171 ft)
- Width: 18 metres (59 ft)
- Height: 25 metres (82 ft) (arch rise)
- No. of spans: 1

History
- Architect: Keith Brownlie
- Engineering design by: Ove Arup & Partners
- Constructed by: Henry Boot Construction
- Construction start: May 1996
- Construction end: April 1997
- Opened: 10 May 1997

Location
- Interactive map of Hulme Arch Bridge

The Hulme Arch Bridge in Hulme, Manchester, England, supports Stretford Road as it passes over Princess Road, and is located at grid reference SJ838968. The construction of the bridge formed part of the regeneration of the Hulme district of Manchester, both by re-establishing the former route of Stretford Road, which had been cut into two halves by the construction of Princess Road in 1969, and by providing a local landmark. The location was previously occupied by a footbridge.

The bridge consists of a deck supported by cables from a single arch that spans the bridge diagonally. The design was selected in June 1995, with construction running between May 1996 and April 1997. It was opened on 10 May 1997 by Alex Ferguson.

== History ==
Stretford Road was divided into two halves in 1969 by the construction of Princess Road. A footbridge was subsequently constructed, crossing Princess Road at the same place as the road previously ran. As part of the regeneration of the Hulme district, it was decided to construct a new bridge to rejoin the two sections of the road, and also to provide a local landmark.

The design of the bridge was selected via a two-staged, closed design competition, commissioned by Hulme Regeneration Ltd and Manchester City Council. The first stage of the competition was held in March 1995, and had six entries. The winning design was selected in June 1995, and was from architects Chris Wilkinson Architects, with the structural engineer being Ove Arup & Partners. The reference for the design of the bridge was Eero Saarinen's Gateway Arch in St. Louis, Missouri, USA. A similar design to Hulme Arch Bridge was subsequently used for Clyde Arc in Glasgow in 2006.

== Design ==
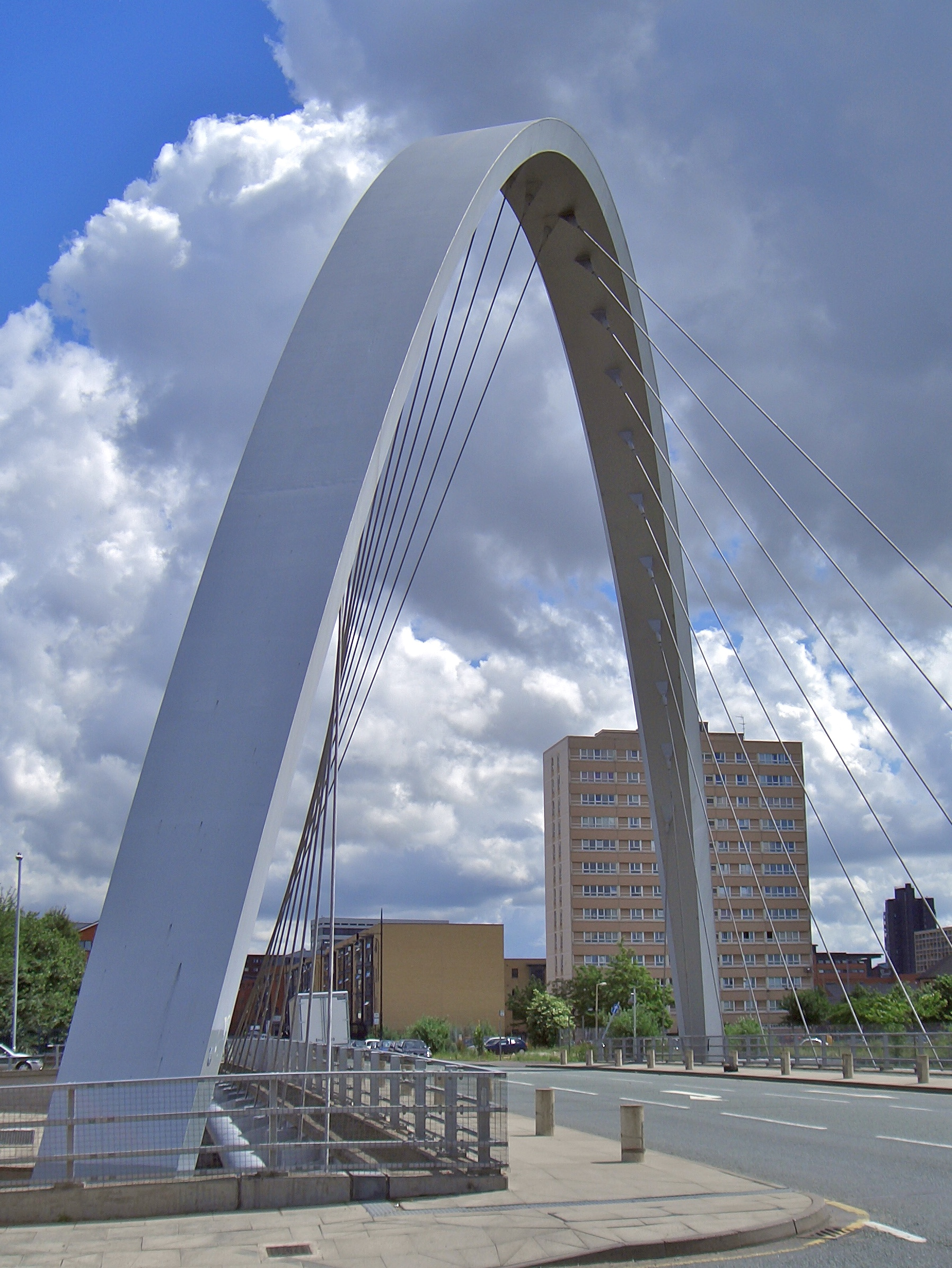
The bridge from the side of Stretford Road

The bridge consists of a 50-metre (160 ft) bridge deck of three 17-by-17-metre (56 by 56 ft) steel and concrete decking segments covered with tarmac. The deck is supported by twenty-two 51-millimetre-diameter (2.0 in) spiral steel cables originating from both sides of a 25-metre-high (82 ft) arch. The parabolic arch is made of six prefabricated trapezoid steel box sections, and spans the bridge diagonally. The bridge is illuminated at night. The arch varies between 1.6 metres (5.2 ft) wide by 1.5 metres (4.9 ft) deep at the bases to 3 metres (9.8 ft) wide and 0.7 metres (2.3 ft) deep at the top. It is supported by a pair of 8.5-by-6.5-by-5.5-metre (28 by 21 by 18 ft) concrete blocks, which bear most of the weight of the bridge. The deck is supported by piled abutments, which incorporate areas for bearing and expansion joint inspection and maintenance. The arch is kept in shape by a number of internal stiffeners and diaphragms, with the top section filled with concrete. To minimise internal rust, the lower sections of the arch were coated with a vapour corrosion inhibitor, with portholes with removable covers inserted into the arch so that the inside could have additional coats applied in the future.

== Construction ==
The three sections of decking were assembled on the broad central reservation of Princess Road, and were craned into position over a weekend when Princess Road was closed. The decking was temporarily supported by trestles until the arch was ready. The six sections of the arch were welded together on site into two halves before being lifted into position during a second weekend. The cables were connected on the third weekend. The bridge was formally opened on 10 May 1997 by Alex Ferguson in a ceremony including the Lord Mayor of Manchester and Tony Wilson. The ceremony was concluded by them being driven over the bridge in a Rolls-Royce Silver Ghost, and was followed by a street festival.

The bridge has been described by the structural engineers as "a perfect example of how imaginative design combined with leading-edge engineering technology can be used to create a landmark structure which captures the public's imagination." In 1997 the bridge was shortlisted for the British Construction Civil Engineering Award. In 1998, the bridge received a Royal Institute of British Architects Award for Architecture; a British Constructional Steelwork Association Structural Steel Design Award Commendation; a Civic Trust Award Commendation, and Institute of Civil Engineers Merit Award.
