= William Watson, Baron Thankerton =

Scottish politician and judge (1873–1948)

The Right Honourable The Lord Thankerton PC
- Lord Thankerton in 1942, by Walter Stoneman

Lord of Appeal in Ordinary
- In office 1 May 1929 – 13 June 1948

Lord Advocate

Solicitor General for Scotland

Personal details
- Born: 8 December 1873 Edinburgh, Scotland
- Died: 13 June 1948 (aged 74)

William Watson, Baron Thankerton, PC (8 December 1873 – 13 June 1948), was a Scottish Unionist Party politician and judge.

== Life ==
Born in Edinburgh, Watson was the third son of Margaret Bannatyne (1846–1898) and William Watson, Baron Watson (1827–1899). He was educated at Winchester College and Jesus College, Cambridge, graduating with a Third in Law in 1895. In 1899, he was admitted to the Faculty of Advocates, taking silk in 1914. He was Procurator to the General Assembly of the Church of Scotland from 1918 to 1922, and was an advocate depute in 1919.

Watson was the Member of Parliament for Lanark South from 1913 to 1918 and for Carlisle from 1924 to 1929. He held office as Solicitor General for Scotland from July 1922 to November 1922, and as Lord Advocate from November 1922 to February 1924 and from November 1924 to May 1929. He was appointed a Privy Counsellor in 1922. He was raised to the bench as a Lord of Appeal in Ordinary and created a life peer as Baron Thankerton, of Thankerton in the County of Lanark, on 1 May 1929, holding the post until his death at 74 in 1948.

Lord Thankerton's hobby was knitting, and he would practise this while hearing cases.

== Sources ==
- Leigh Rayment's Historical List of MPs
- Concise Dictionary of National Biography

Parliament of the United Kingdom
Preceded by Sir Walter Menzies	Member of Parliament for South Lanarkshire; 1913 – 1918	Constituency abolished
Preceded by George Middleton	Member of Parliament for Carlisle; 1924 – 1929	Succeeded by George Middleton
Legal offices
Preceded by Andrew Constable	Solicitor General for Scotland; 1922	Succeeded by David Pinkerton Fleming
Preceded by Charles David Murray	Lord Advocate; 1922–1924	Succeeded by Hugh Pattison MacMillan
Preceded by Hugh Pattison MacMillan	Lord Advocate; 1924–1929	Succeeded by Alexander Munro MacRobert
