= Mauldslie Castle =

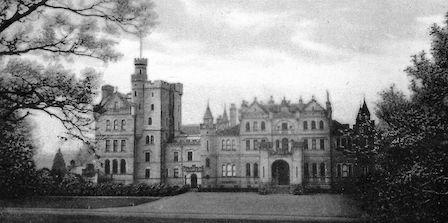
- The castle in the 19th century

- Location of Mauldslie Castle in South Lanarkshire
- 55.7310°N 3.9021°W
- Location: Dalserf, South Lanarkshire, Scotland

History
- Built: 1792
- Demolished: 1935 (91 years ago)

Mauldslie Castle, part of the Mauldslie Estate, was located in Dalserf, South Lanarkshire, Scotland.

The nearby village of Rosebank was established before 1816 by the estate's workers.

== History ==
Developed around a mediaeval tower house dating to the 16th century, in 1792 a baronial mansion was built by Thomas Carmichael, 5th Earl of Hyndford, to a design by Robert Adam.

Haugh Hill, to the south, is home to a family burial ground. Thomas was the first to be interred there upon his death in 1810.

Andrew, 6th Earl of Hyndford, and his nephew, Archibald Nisbet, Earl of Carfin, owned the estate after Thomas' death. They split the estate, with the lower part taken over by Archibald. Andrew, the last Earl of Hyndford, died in 1817 without issue. His upper part of the estate passed to Sir Windham Carmichael-Anstruther. The lower part later passed to Gordon of Harperfield, then William Dixon.

William Hozier, 1st Baron Newlands, bought the estate in 1850. A decade later, the mansion house was extended by David Bryce, who also designed the West Lodge. When the mansion house was extended, Mauldslie Woods and pleasure gardens were established to attract families and guests. The courtyard stable range still exists, but they, along with the lodges, are now in private hands. The walled garden was later demolished.

The West Lodge, Mauldslie Bridge (which spans the River Clyde) and the Marna South Lodge, in nearby Carluke, are all listed buildings.

James Hozier, 2nd Baron Newlands, who inherited the estate in 1906, hosted King George V and Mary of Teck at the mansion in July 1914, just prior to the outbreak of World War I. He died without issue in 1929. The lands were sold off in forty separate lots. The castle was demolished two years later.

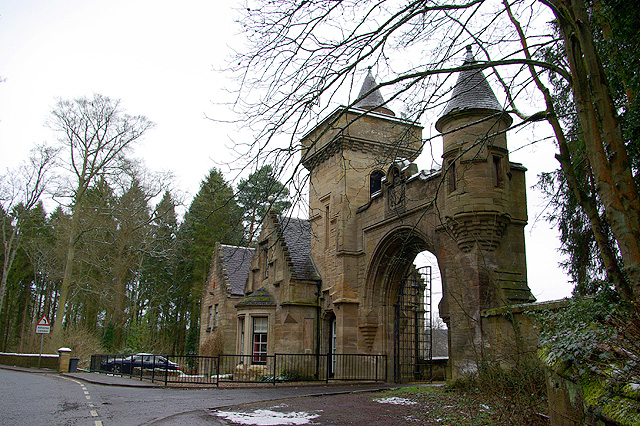
West Lodge on Mauldslie Bridge

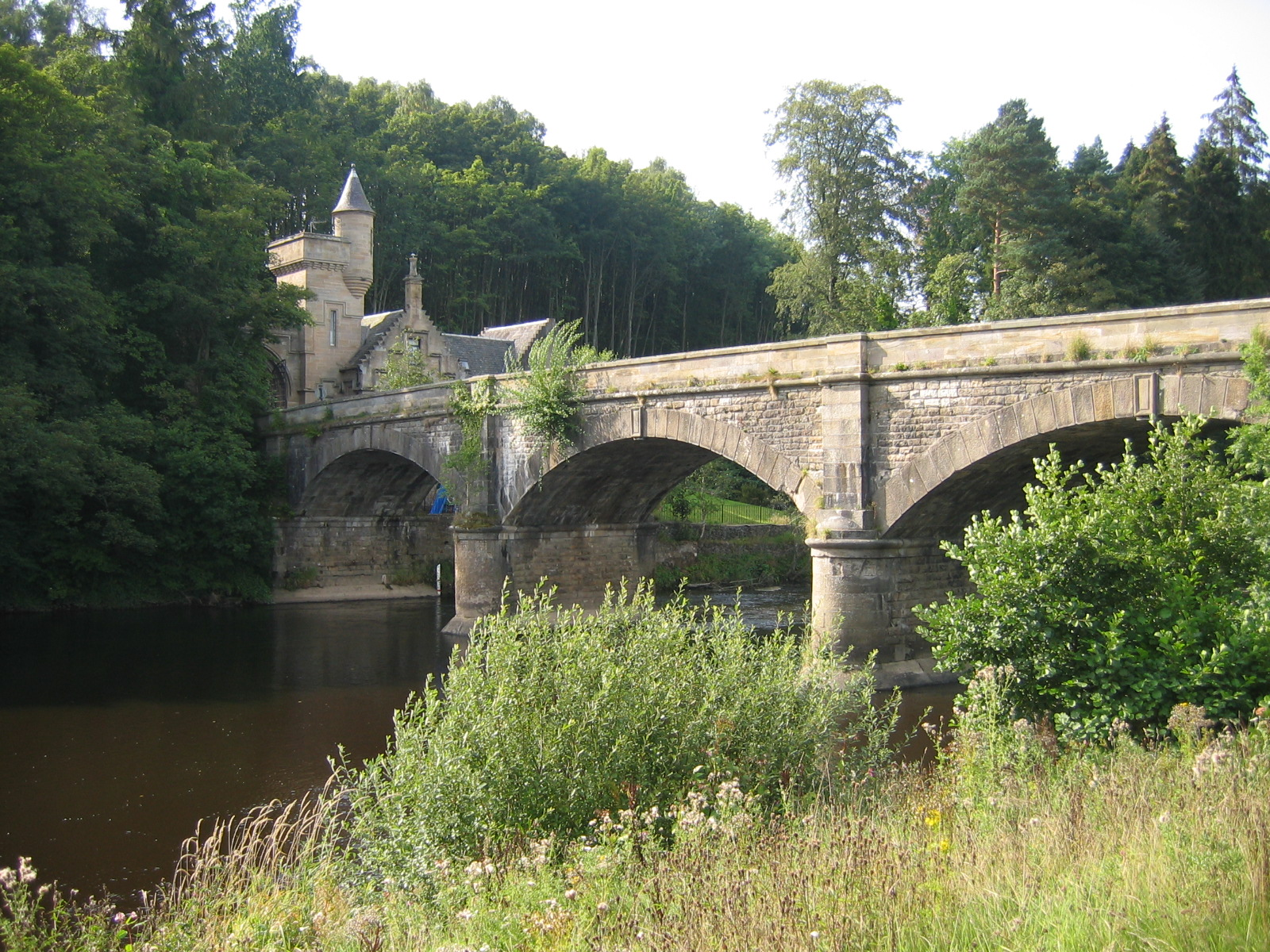
Mauldslie Bridge over the River Clyde
