= William Gordon (British Army officer, born 1814) =

British Army officer

Major-General Sir William Gordon KCB
- Born: John William Gordon; 4 November 1814; Carfin, Lanarkshire, Scotland
- Died: 18 February 1870 (aged 55); Westward Ho!, Devon, England
- Military career
- Allegiance: United Kingdom
- Branch: British Army
- Service years: 1823-1870
- Rank: Major-General
- Nickname: Old Fireworks
- Commands: Royal Horse Guards (1856-1861). Royal Engineers (1869-1870)
- Battles: Battle of Alma, Battle of Inkerman, Siege of Sevastopol
- Awards: Knight Commander of the Order of the Bath
- Other work: Institution of Civil Engineers (member)

Major-General Sir John William Gordon KCB (4 November 1814 – 8 February 1870) was a British Army officer and Inspector-General of Engineers.

Gordon obtained a commission in the Royal Engineers in 1823 and served in the United Kingdom and British North America (including the Imperial fortress of Bermuda) before the outbreak of the Crimean War.

Due to casualties during the Siege of Sevastopol, he was temporarily commanding the army's Royal Engineers contingent. He was brevetted three times during the war, from captain to colonel, became a Companion of the Order of the Bath (CB) and received the nickname "Old Fireworks" for coolness under fire. Later in the siege he was wounded, being shot in both arms, and returned to the United Kingdom.

After the war he served with the Royal Horse Guards, commanded the defensive works at Plymouth and briefly commanded engineers in Canada when British involvement with the American Civil War became a possibility. During this period he was an appointed a Knight Commander of the Order of the Bath (KCB), promoted to major general and became a member of the Institution of Civil Engineers. In 1869 he was appointed the Inspector-General of Engineers, the head of the Corps of Royal Engineers. However, in 1870 Gordon committed suicide, attributed to insanity brought on by his wounds from the Crimean War, in Westward Ho!, Devon while visiting family. He also was in India for East India Company.

== Early life ==
Gordon was born in 1814, the eldest son of Colonel Thomas Gordon of Harperfield, Lanarkshire. The estate came to him while still young on his father's death, and through his mother, Jane Vigor Nisbet of Carfin, niece of Andrew, last Earl of Hyndford, he inherited Carfin and Mauldslie Castle. From a private school at Bexley he passed into the Royal Military Academy, Woolwich, and obtained a commission in the Royal Engineers on 1 December 1823.

He passed the first twenty years of his service at various stations at home and in British North America. On his promotion to captain in July 1845 he was appointed to command the 1st Company, Royal Engineers, which he took shortly afterwards to Bermuda (an oceanic archipelago within British North America that had been elevated to an Imperial fortress by the independence of the colonies that became the United States of America), and where the Royal Engineers were heavily engaged through much of the 19th Century with the construction of the Royal Naval Dockyard, Bermuda, numerous forts and coastal batteries, barracks, Gibb's Hill Lighthouse, the Causeway, military roads and other defence works; he remained there six years.

== Crimean war ==
On the outbreak of the Crimean War he was at once sent to the East, was present at the battles of Alma and Inkerman, and was director of the right attack during the early days of the siege. A month after the siege commenced, owing to several casualties, Gordon found himself Commanding Royal Engineer of the army, and held the position until the arrival of Sir Harry Jones. The loss of officers increased the strain upon the survivors, and Gordon's energy and physical training were severely tried. During one bombardment he never slept nor sat down to a meal for the greater part of three days.

Gordon became achieved fame during the war and was called "Gordon of Gordon's battery" in English newspapers. He was very popular among the naval brigade, and was always welcome in their lines. Due to his coolness under enemy fire, which he may have attracted due to his height, and his disdain to hide from it, the sailors called him "Old Fireworks" throughout the siege.

During the siege of Sevastopol, while directing siege operations during a sortie on 22 March 1855, Gordon was severely wounded when a ball passed through both arms. Although he soon returned to duty and commanded the Royal Engineers in the Kerch expedition, he had eventually to be invalided before the fall of Sevastopol.

He obtained a brevet majority on 12 December 1854, a brevet lieutenant-colonelcy 24 April 1855, and a brevet colonelcy 29 June 1855. He was also made a C.B. and aide-de-camp to the queen.

== Later life ==
In 1856 he was appointed deputy adjutant-general at the Royal Horse Guards, a position which he held for five years. While at the Horse Guards he was elected a member of the Institution of Civil Engineers. Gordon's next appointment was Commanding Royal Engineer of the Southern District, where the works for the defence of Portsmouth had recently been commenced. His command at Portsmouth was broken temporarily by a call to Canada to command the engineers on occasion of the Trent affair at the end of 1861. While at Portsmouth he was made a K.C.B. Soon after leaving that command, on 3 August 1866, he was promoted to major-general. On 1 June 1869 he was selected for the appointment of Inspector-General of Engineers, the head of the Corps of Royal Engineers. The previous holder of the position, Edward Frome, had been titled "Inspector-General of Engineers and Director of Work" but the positions were split. There was, however, no Director of Work during Gordon's life.

He did not long enjoy the honour of high office. Disease of the brain, caused by increasing irritation of his Crimean wound, set in, and the suffering which finally destroyed his judgment was borne patiently and in silence. Accompanied by his friend Colonel Charles George Gordon, he was on a visit to his brother-in-law, Colonel Hutchinson, at Westward Ho! in February 1870, when he slashed his throat with a razor. He died of blood loss the following day, on 8 February 1870, aged 55 years. An inquest issued a verdict of suicide while of unsound mind.

A full-length portrait of him hangs in the headquarters mess of the Royal Engineers at Chatham.

== Character ==
According to Robert Hamilton Vetch, writing in the Dictionary of National Biography, "[Gordon] was a man of great height and strength, and careless of danger; his earnest religious convictions governed his whole conduct, though his warmth of feeling was hidden under a cold exterior."

Regarding his earlier posting in Bermuda, Vetch also adds, "his name was remembered in the islands long after his departure, not only for his athletic feats, but for a liberality to the poor which continued for many years after he had left the place."
