= 1913 South Lanarkshire by-election =

UK parliamentary by-election

The 1913 South Lanarkshire by-election was a Parliamentary by-election held on 12 December 1913. The constituency returned one Member of Parliament (MP) to the House of Commons of the United Kingdom, elected by the first past the post voting system.

== Vacancy ==
Sir Walter Menzies had been Liberal MP for South Lanarkshire since 1906 until he died on 26 October 1913. He had died after a long illness, so the calling of a by-election was not unexpected.

== Previous result ==
Menzies

General election December 1910: South Lanarkshire
Party	Candidate	Votes	%	±%
Liberal	Walter Menzies	5,160	56.6	−2.4
Unionist	Charles Mackinnon Douglas	3,963	43.4	+2.4
Majority		1,197	13.2	−4.8
Turnout		9,123	84.8	−0.5
Liberal hold		Swing	-2.4	

== Candidates ==
- Forty-three-year-old George Morton was selected to defend the seat for the Liberals. He was born in the constituency in the village of Auchengray where his father owned a farm. He was a graduate of the University of Edinburgh, and after training as a lawyer was admitted to the Scottish Bar in 1895. In 1911 he became an Advocate-Depute.
- William Watson was a 40-year-old Advocate. Watson was the son of William Watson, Baron Watson, and was educated at Winchester and Jesus College, Cambridge, graduating with a third class degree in law in 1895. He was admitted as an advocate in 1899.
- The Labour Party fielded a candidate in the constituency for the first time in Thomas Gibb, a Miner's check-weighman from Cleland, North Lanarkshire. Back in August 1913, the Lanarkshire Miners’ Union decided to select a candidate to contest a future by-election. Unlike most miners unions at the time, the Lanarkshire Union was dominated by Socialists who were not sympathetic to the Liberal Party. A ballot of their members was held and Gibb beat three other candidates to secure the nomination. The Labour Party nationally was attempting to balance the wishes of their partners in parliament, the Liberal Party, with the wishes of Constituency Labour Parties seeking to field candidates in by-elections. No decision had been taken by the Labour Party National Executive when Gibb stated "First and foremost, I am a Socialist. If I cannot win South Lanark as Socialist" then I won't win it at all." When it became clear in early November that Gibb would stand with the backing of the Scottish Miners’ Federation, the Labour Party decided to endorse him as their candidate.

== Campaign ==
Polling Day was arranged for 12 December 1913, 47 days after the death of Menzies. This allowed for an unusually long campaign. Watson's task was to become the first Unionist to win here since 1900.

Although adopted as the official Labour Party candidate, Gibb's campaign billed him as the "Socialist and Labour" candidate. He was also to enjoy the active support of local British Socialist Party branches. He stated his intention to focus his campaign on the issue of poverty.

The Liberal Government's National Insurance Act 1911 became an issue in the campaign. The measures of the act were now being implemented with 2.3 million people insured under the scheme for unemployment benefit and almost 15 million insured for sickness benefit. The Unionists had opposed the measure and continued to attack it at by-elections. The Labour Party had given support to the policy when it was introduced but in a number of by-elections since, their candidates had spoken out against it. Tom Gibb was no exception, stating "I am no believer in policy of social reform paid for out of the earnings of the workers, such as we have seen illustrated in the Insurance Act. The reform that does not increase the purchasing-power of the workers by transferring to them some of the wealth previously enjoyed by the idle rich is not, in my opinion, a reform. If I believed in reforms of that nature, I would not be a Socialist."

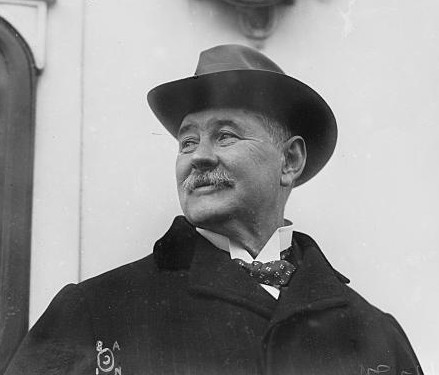
O'Connor

Although there were not many Irish voters in the constituency, the Liberal campaign was supported by a visit from T. P. O'Connor the Irish Nationalist MP from Liverpool. The Irish Nationalists were key supporters of the Liberal Government due to the 3rd Irish Home Rule Bill.

The issue of Scottish Home Rule entered the campaign through the intervention of the Young Scots. The Liberal Government had introduced a Scottish Home Rule Bill that had passed its second reading in May 1913, despite Unionist opposition. The Young Scots were critical of Gibb's lack of support for the policy.

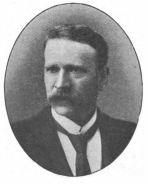
Smillie

Leading Labour Party figure, Robert Smillie speaking during the campaign in support of Gibb said any miner who did not vote Labour was a traitor to his class and he threatened those miners who did would be black-legged. Countering for the Liberal campaign, J.M. Robertson argued that anyone voting for Gibb would be the traitor; He argued that Gibb had no chance of success and that any vote for him risked letting in the anti-democratic Tory which would damage the interests of the workers.

The Labour Party campaign believed that Gibb could win the election; They hoped that he could secure the votes of the constituency's 3,000 miners as a minimum and with the support of the railwaymen, farm servants and other workmen, he would romp home.

== Result ==
The Unionist candidate gained the seat, despite seeing his vote share drop. The Liberals had been denied the seat by the intervention of the Labour candidate. The Labour poll represented barely half the number of miners voters in the constituency and significantly down on their expectations;

1913 South Lanarkshire by-election Electorate
Party	Candidate	Votes	%	±%
Unionist	William Watson	4,257	42.8	−0.6
Liberal	George Morton	4,006	40.3	−16.3
Labour	Thomas Gibb	1,674	16.8	New
Majority		251	2.5	N/A
Turnout		9,937		
Unionist gain from Liberal		Swing	+7.8	

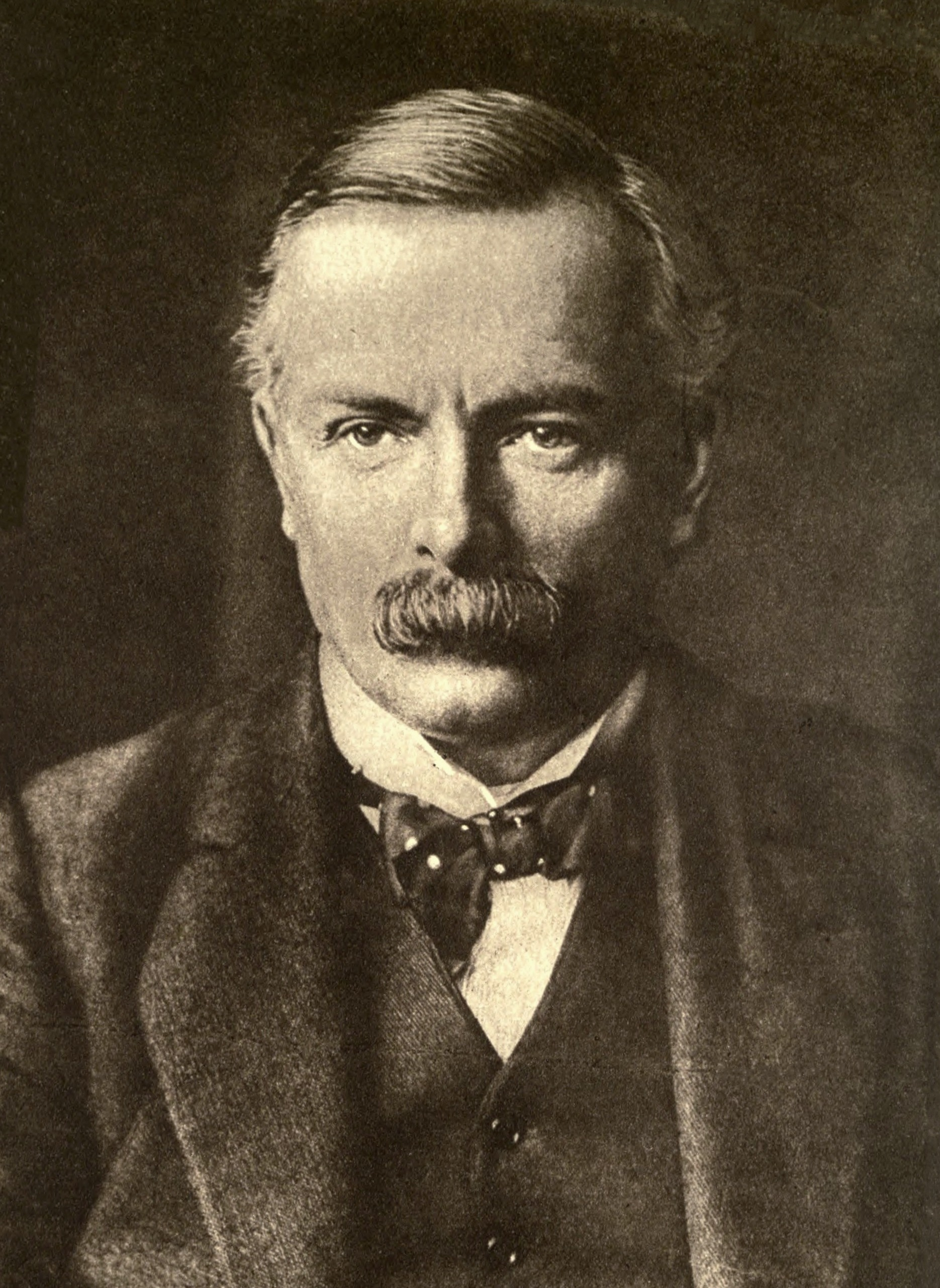
Lloyd George

David Lloyd George the Chancellor of the Exchequer, in a letter to Morton said he "regretted the division in the progressive ranks of the electors in the constituency and the only satisfaction reserved for the Labour competitor was that he would possibly succeed in manoeuvering a Liberal constituency into the Tory lobby to vote for land monopoly in Great Britain and to support civil war in Ireland."

== Aftermath ==
A General election was due to take place by the end of 1915. By the summer of 1914, the following candidates had been adopted to contest that election.

- Unionist Party: William Watson

Due to the outbreak of war, the election never took place. For the 1918 General election, the constituency was abolished and Watson decided to retire from the House of Commons. Neither Morton nor Gibb stood for parliament again.
