= Bell's Bridge =

Pedestrian bridge spanning the River Clyde in Glasgow, Scotland

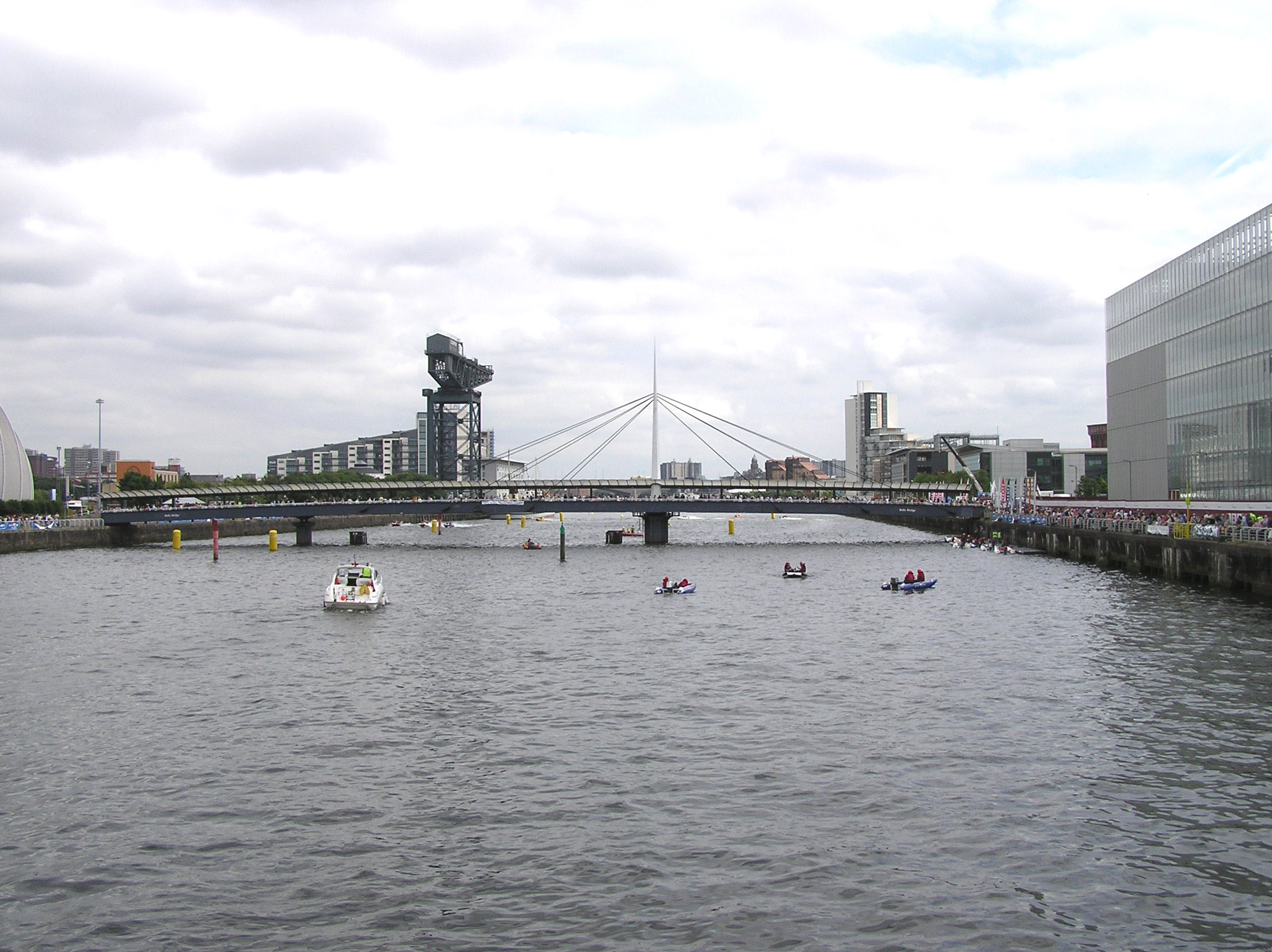
- Bell's Bridge, viewed upstream of the Millennium Bridge
- Coordinates: 55°51′31.4″N 4°17′21.1″W
- Carries: 7
- Crosses: River Clyde
- Locale: Glasgow
- Preceded by: Clyde Arc
- Followed by: Millennium Bridge

Characteristics
- Design: Swing

History
- Built: 1988

Location
- Interactive map of Bell's Bridge

Bell's Bridge is a pedestrian bridge spanning the River Clyde in Glasgow, Scotland. A swivelling swing bridge, it was constructed in 1988 to coincide with the Glasgow Garden Festival, it allowed pedestrians to cross from the main exhibition site to the SEC Centre on the other side of the river.

The northern stub of the bridge is supported only by the quay, whereas the majority of the bridge consists of a cable-stayed span which can rotate through 90 degrees, providing two lanes of passage for river traffic (one on each side). It is named for the Arthur Bell & Sons whisky company, who sponsored its construction. The bridge was designed by Sir William Arrol & Co. and constructed by John Young and Company (Kelvinhaugh) Ltd.

== See also ==
- List of bridges in Scotland

| Next bridge upstream | River Clyde | Next bridge downstream |
| Clyde Arc | Bell's Bridge | Millennium Bridge |
