= Glasgow Garden Festival =

Garden Festival

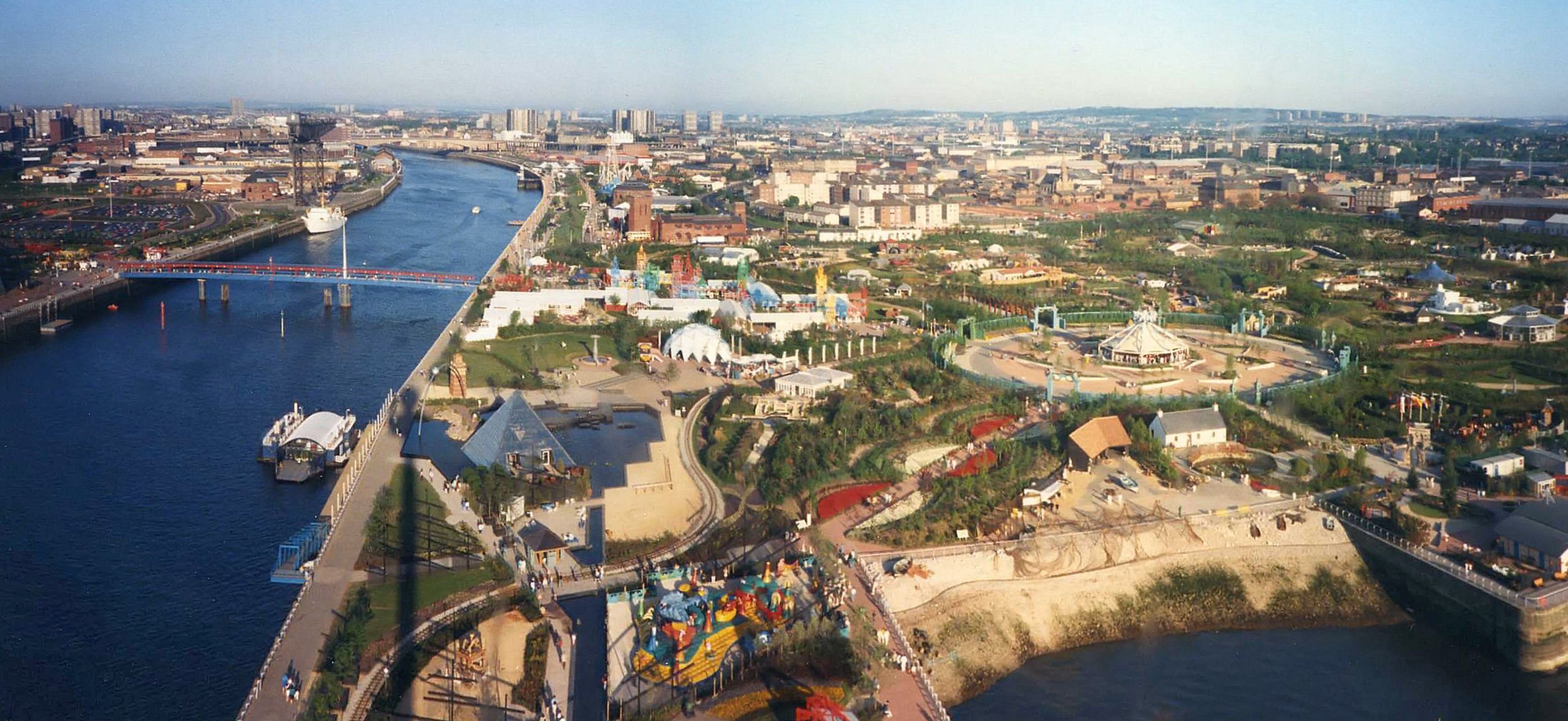
- An overhead view of the festival site, and its surrounding urban environment
- Date: 28 April – 26 September 1988
- Location: Plantation Quay, Govan, Glasgow, Scotland; 55.8592°N 4.2960°W

The Glasgow Garden Festival was the third of the five national garden festivals, and the only one to take place in Scotland.

It was held in Glasgow between 28 April and 26 September 1988. It was the first event of its type to be held in the city in 50 years, since the Empire Exhibition of 1938, and also marked the centenary of Glasgow's first International Exhibition, the International Exhibition of Science, Art and Industry of 1888.

It attracted 4.3 million visitors over 152 days, by far the most successful of the five National Garden Festivals. Its significance in the rebirth of the city was underlined by the 1990 European City of Culture title bestowed on Glasgow in September 1986. The two events together did much to restore Glasgow to national and international prominence.

== The festival site ==
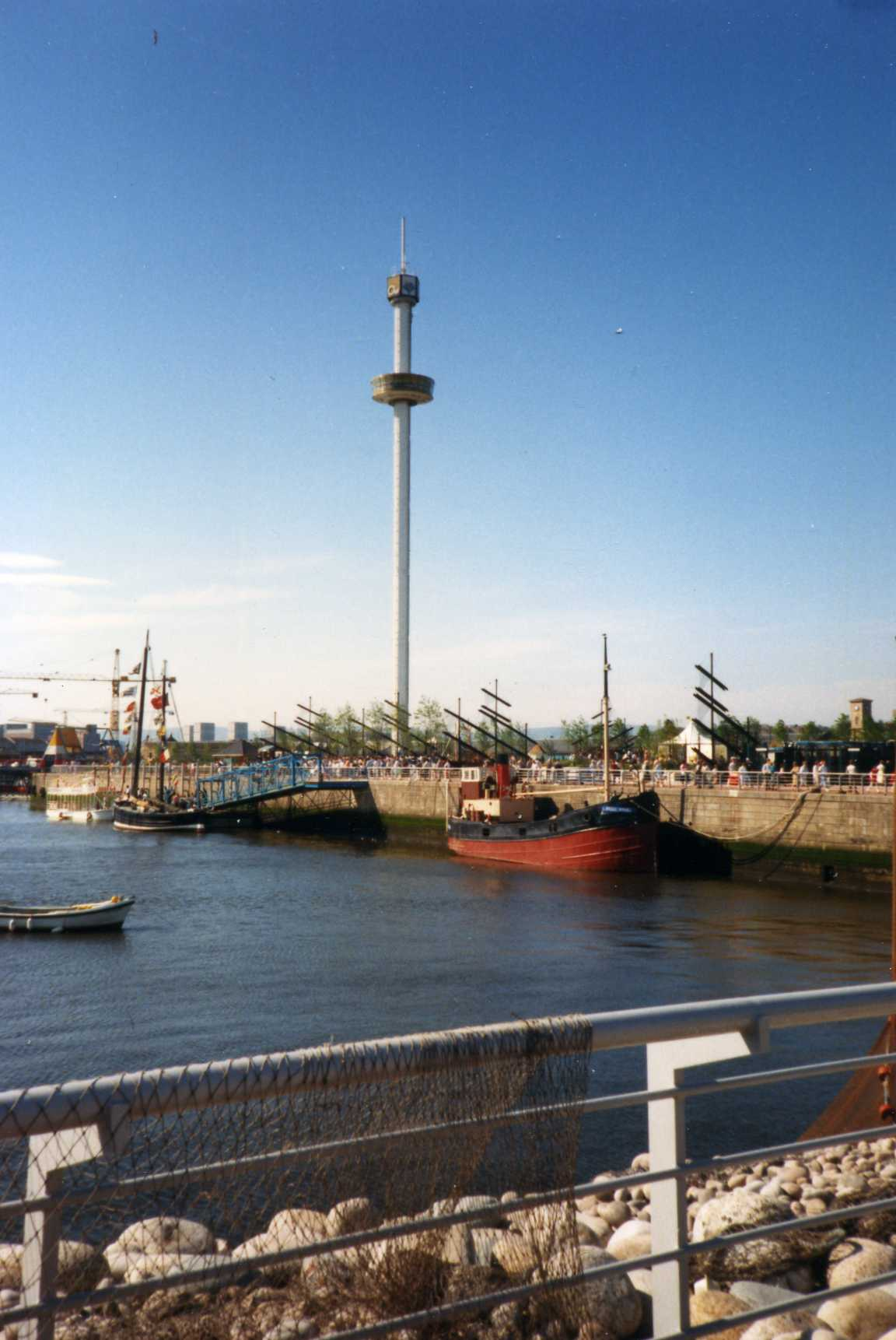
The Clydesdale Bank 150th Anniversary Tower was an observation tower that dominated the Glasgow Garden Festival site.

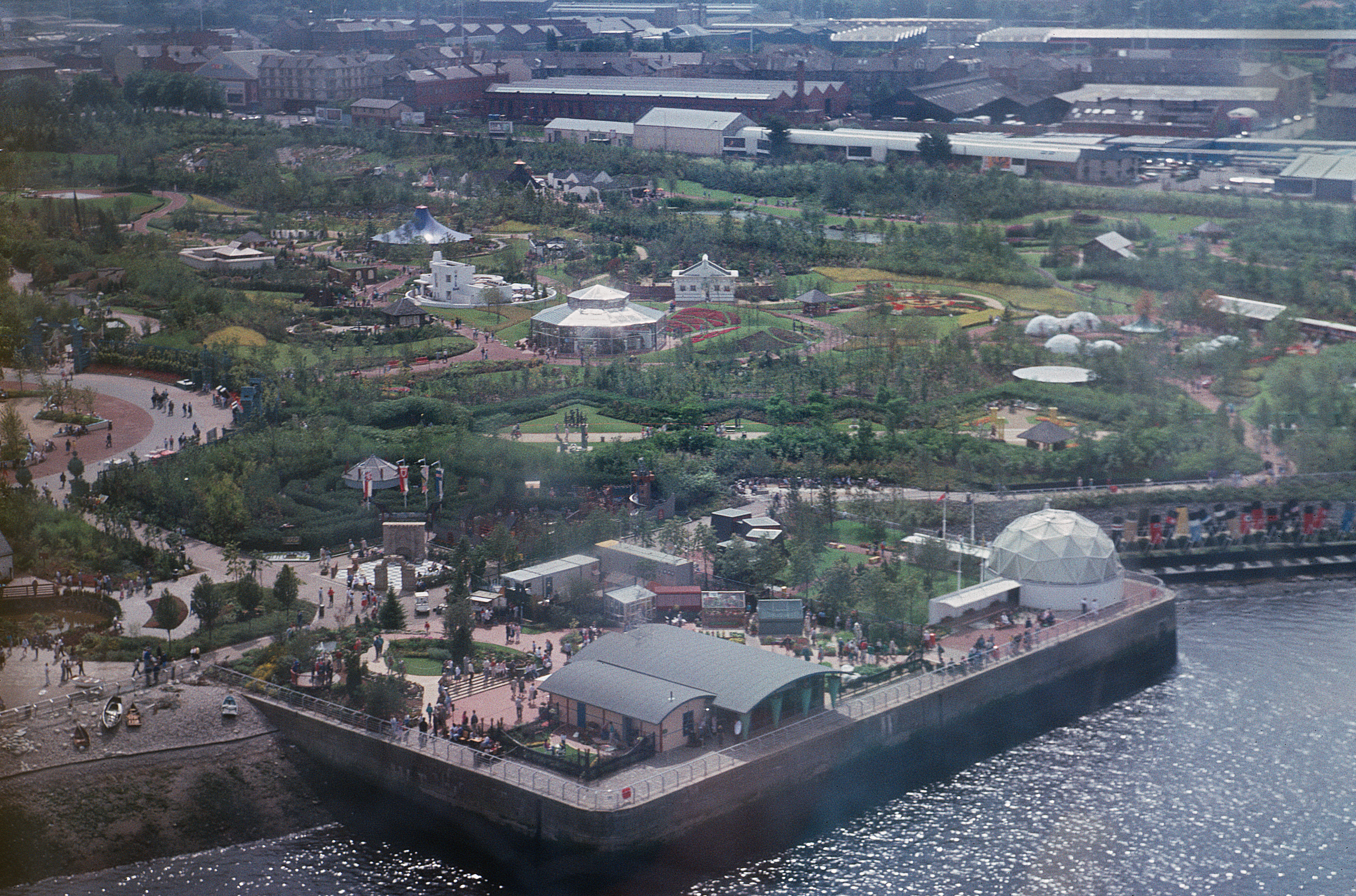
Another view of the festival site from the Clydesdale Bank Tower

The festival site covered 120 acres (0.49 km^{2}), including 17 of water, on the south bank of the River Clyde at Plantation Quay in Govan, and also on land reclaimed from the partial filling-in of the Prince's Dock basin. Once the largest dock on the River Clyde when opened in 1900, it had been closed to navigation in the early 1970s with the advent of Containerization. Continuing businesses including Smith & McLean Galvanisers were now resited elsewhere in the city. Most of the docklands required had already been sold by the Clyde Port Authority to the private residential property developer Laing Homes. To ensure a clear site the Scottish Development Agency and Glasgow City Council identified suitable off-set sites within the city which Laing Homes then purchased and promptly developed, relinquishing their ownership of the dockland site.

The Festival was designed and built by the Scottish Development Agency after the necessary industrial dismantling and site-clearing. The Agency also led the creation of the Scottish Exhibition Centre on the north bank of the Clyde, upon the site of the Queen's Dock. Glasgow Garden Festival 1988 Ltd., a subsidiary of the Scottish Development Agency, managed the public operation of the Festival.

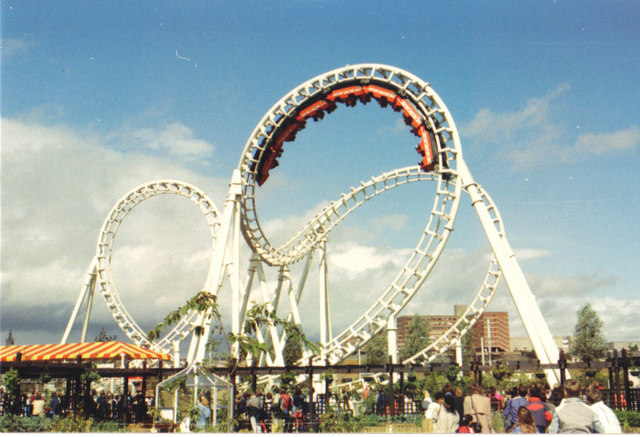
The Coca-Cola Roller roller coaster ride.

Features included the 240 feet (73 m) high Clydesdale Bank 150th Anniversary Tower, the Coca-Cola Roller roller coaster, a miniature railway and five former Glasgow Corporation Tramways vintage trams running again in the city along the riverside. A new swing bridge, Bell's Bridge, sponsored by the Distillers Company, had been constructed across the river to link the Garden Festival to the SECC, which held the Grand International Show in its Hall 4 in conjunction with the festival. The official opening ceremony took place on 29 April and was conducted by Prince Charles and Princess Diana. The event had significant media coverage, including daily BBC TV magazine shows, The Beechgrove Garden and radio features, the festival was also used as a backdrop for the Taggart episode "Root of Evil" and an episode of the comedy show City Lights.

== After the Garden Festival ==
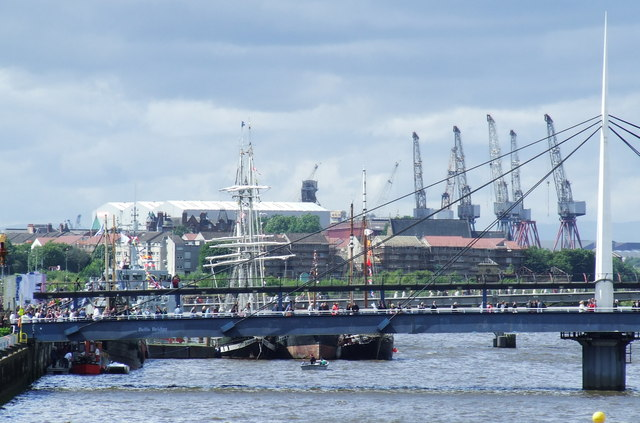
The Bell's Bridge, opened in 1988 as the world's longest pedestrian swing bridge and remains one of the enduring physical legacies of the Garden Festival.

After the end of the festival, the site was expected to be developed for commerce and leisure, with a small Festival Park retained. After a decade and more new developments started on the site, it was renamed Pacific Quay.

The Glasgow Science Centre, substantially led by SDA with the City Council, Glasgow University and others, was built and close by the media campus and digital centres, which include new headquarters for BBC Scotland and Scottish Television, opening in 2007. The Clydesdale Bank tower was dismantled and re-erected in Rhyl in North Wales; however, its spiritual successor came in the form of the Glasgow Millennium Tower as part of the Science Centre complex, which stands on approximately the same spot. Office premises and hotels have completed the development.

In 2018 a number of events were held across Glasgow to celebrate the 30th anniversary of the festival. These included exhibitions at The Mitchell Library, Kelvingrove Art Gallery and a summer festival, The Glasgow Garden Wildlife Festival, led by RSPB Scotland and Glasgow City Council.

== See also ==
- Glasgow International Exhibition (1901)
- Scottish Exhibition of National History, Art and Industry (1911)
- List of tallest buildings and structures in Glasgow
