= Millennium Bridge, Glasgow =

Bridge over the River Clyde in Scotland

Millennium Bridge
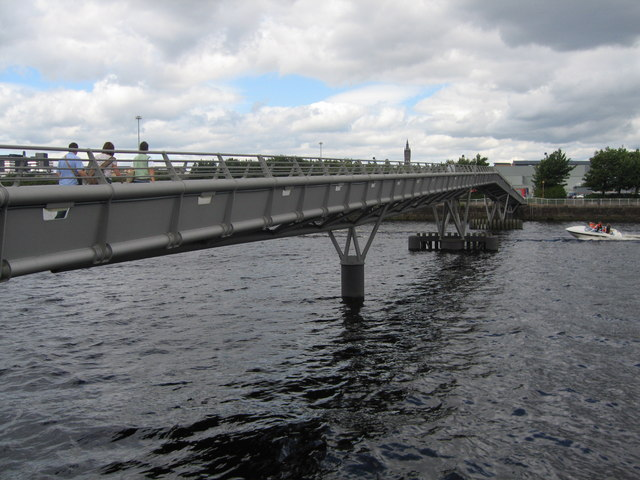
- Bridge crossing the River Clyde
- Coordinates: 55.8593°N 4.2924°W
- Crosses: River Clyde
- Locale: Glasgow
- Preceded by: Bell's Bridge
- Followed by: Govan-Partick Bridge

History
- Opened: 2002

Location
- Interactive map of Millennium Bridge

The Millennium Bridge is a pedestrian bridge over the River Clyde in the city of Glasgow, Scotland, built as part of the millennium celebrations and funded by the Millennium Commission. The Bridge links the SEC Centre with the Glasgow Science Centre and Pacific Quay development to the south.

The bridge was opened to the public in 2002.

The bridge is currently closed to marine traffic (2023)

== See also ==
- List of bridges in Scotland

Next bridge upstream	River Clyde	Next bridge downstream
Bell's Bridge	Millennium Bridge	Govan-Partick Bridge
