= South Lanarkshire (UK Parliament constituency) =

Parliamentary constituency in the United Kingdom, 1868–1918

- Former county constituency for the House of Commons
- Subdivisions of Scotland: County of Lanark

1868–1918
- Seats: One
- Replaced by: Lanark

South Lanarkshire was a county constituency of the House of Commons of the Parliament of the United Kingdom (Westminster) from 1868 to 1918. It elected one Member of Parliament (MP) by the first past the post voting system.

== Boundaries ==
The Representation of the People (Scotland) Act 1868 provided that the South Lanarkshire constituency was to consist of the parishes of Biggar, Cambusnethan, Carluke, Carmichael, Carnwath, Carstairs, Covington and Thankerton, Crawford, Crawfordjohn, Dalserf, Dolphinton, Douglas, Dunsyre, Lanark, Lesmahagow, Libberton, Pitinain, Shotts, Stonehouse, Walston, Wandell and Lamington, Wiston and Roberton, and so much of the parishes of Culter and Moffat as is situated in the County of Lanark.

The Redistribution of Seats Act 1885 provided that the constituency was to consist of:

the parishes of Biggar, Carluke, Carmichael, Carnwath, Carstairs, Covington and Thankerton, Crawford, Crawfordjohn, Culter, Dolphinton, Douglas, Dunsyre, Lamington and Wandel, Lanark, Lesmahagow, Liberton, Pettinain, Symington, Walston, Wiston and Roberton, Moffat, Avondale, Stonehouse, Glasford, and East Kilbride; so much of the parish of Cathcart as adjoins East Kilbride, and so much of the parish of Kirkpatrick-Juxta as may be in the county of Lanark.

== Members of Parliament ==
Election	Member	Party
1868	John Hamilton	Liberal
1874	Sir Windham Carmichael-Anstruther	Conservative
1880	John Hamilton	Liberal
1886	James Hozier	Conservative
1906	Walter Menzies	Liberal
1913 b-e	Hon. William Watson	Unionist
1918	Constituency abolished	

== Elections ==
=== Elections in the 1860s ===
General election 1868: South Lanarkshire
Party	Candidate	Votes	%	±%
Liberal	John Hamilton	1,328	54.5	
Conservative	Sir Norman Macdonald Lockhart, 4th Baronet	1,107	45.5	
Majority		221	9.0	
Turnout		2,435	84.8	
Registered electors		2,871		
Liberal win (new seat)				

=== Elections in the 1870s ===
General election 1874: South Lanarkshire
Party	Candidate	Votes	%	±%
Conservative	Windham Carmichael-Anstruther	1,347	50.4	+4.9
Liberal	John Hamilton	1,326	49.6	−4.9
Majority		21	0.8	N/A
Turnout		2,673	83.2	−1.6
Registered electors		3,214		
Conservative gain from Liberal		Swing	+4.9	

=== Elections in the 1880s ===
General election 1880: South Lanarkshire
Party	Candidate	Votes	%	±%
Liberal	John Hamilton	1,808	55.8	+6.2
Conservative	Windham Carmichael-Anstruther	1,430	44.2	−6.2
Majority		378	11.6	N/A
Turnout		3,238	88.3	+5.1
Registered electors		3,666		
Liberal gain from Conservative		Swing	+6.2	

General election 1885: South Lanarkshire
Party	Candidate	Votes	%	±%
Liberal	John Hamilton	4,583	58.5	+2.7
Conservative	James Hozier	3,245	41.5	−2.7
Majority		1,338	17.0	+5.4
Turnout		7,828	87.2	−1.1
Registered electors		8,981		
Liberal hold		Swing	+2.7	

General election 1886: South Lanarkshire
Party	Candidate	Votes	%	±%
Conservative	James Hozier	3,577	50.1	+8.6
Liberal	John Hamilton	3,559	49.9	−8.6
Majority		18	0.2	N/A
Turnout		7,136	79.5	−7.7
Registered electors		8,981		
Conservative gain from Liberal		Swing	+8.6	

=== Elections in the 1890s ===
General election 1892: South Lanarkshire
Party	Candidate	Votes	%	±%
Conservative	James Hozier	4,032	52.4	+2.3
Liberal	Thomas Hedderwick	3,664	47.6	−2.3
Majority		368	4.8	+4.6
Turnout		7,696	87.3	+7.8
Registered electors		8,818		
Conservative hold		Swing	+2.3	

General election 1895: South Lanarkshire
Party	Candidate	Votes	%	±%
Conservative	James Hozier	4,053	51.5	−0.9
Liberal	Robert Lambie	3,823	48.5	+0.9
Majority		230	3.0	−1.8
Turnout		7,876	86.2	−1.1
Registered electors		9,136		
Conservative hold		Swing	-0.9	

=== Elections in the 1900s ===
General election 1900: South Lanarkshire
Party	Candidate	Votes	%	±%
Conservative	James Hozier	3,968	53.0	+1.5
Liberal	Walter Menzies	3,516	47.0	−1.5
Majority		452	6.0	+3.0
Turnout		7,484	81.9	−4.3
Registered electors		9,134		
Conservative hold		Swing	+1.5	

Walter Menzies

General election 1906: South Lanarkshire
Party	Candidate	Votes	%	±%
Liberal	Walter Menzies	4,816	57.6	+10.6
Conservative	James Dennistoun Mitchell	3,541	42.4	−10.6
Majority		1,275	15.2	N/A
Turnout		8,357	84.0	+2.1
Registered electors		9,950		
Liberal gain from Conservative		Swing	+10.6	

=== Elections in the 1910s ===
General election January 1910: South Lanarkshire
Party	Candidate	Votes	%	±%
Liberal	Walter Menzies	5,346	59.0	+1.4
Conservative	James Dennistoun Mitchell	3,715	41.0	−1.4
Majority		1,631	18.0	+2.8
Turnout		9,061	85.3	+1.3
Liberal hold		Swing		

General election December 1910: South Lanarkshire
Party	Candidate	Votes	%	±%
Liberal	Walter Menzies	5,160	56.6	−2.4
Liberal Unionist	Charles Mackinnon Douglas	3,963	43.4	+2.4
Majority		1,187	13.2	−4.8
Turnout		9,123	84.8	−0.5
Liberal hold		Swing	-2.4	

1913 South Lanarkshire by-election
Party	Candidate	Votes	%	±%
Unionist	William Watson	4,257	42.8	−0.6
Liberal	George Morton (QC)	4,006	40.3	−16.3
Labour	Thomas Gibb	1,674	16.8	New
Majority		251	2.5	N/A
Turnout		9,937		
Unionist gain from Liberal		Swing	+7.8	

General Election 1914–15:

Another General Election was required to take place before the end of 1915. The political parties had been making preparations for an election to take place and by July 1914, the following candidates had been selected;

- Unionist: William Watson
- Liberal: George Morton (QC)
- Labour:
