= James Hozier, 2nd Baron Newlands =

Scottish politician

James Hozier
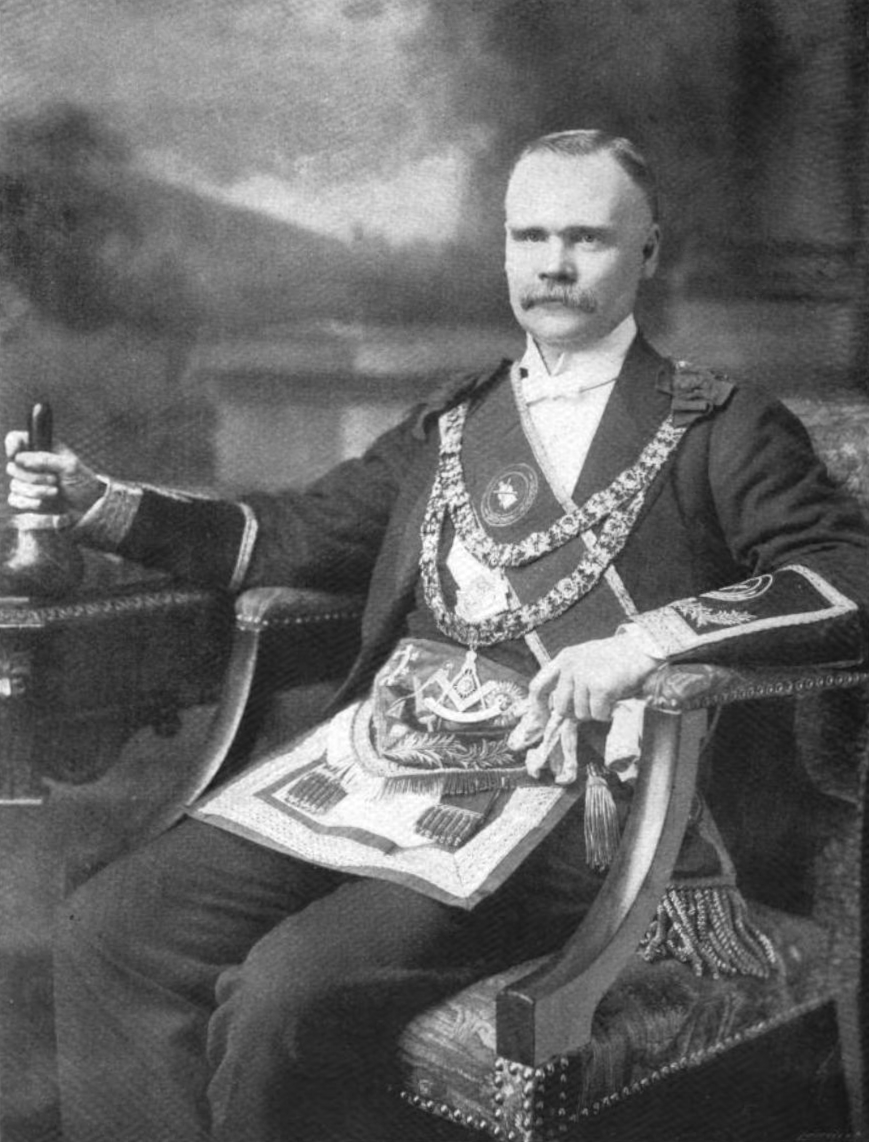
- In The Sketch, 15 August 1900

Member of Parliament
- In office 1886–1906
- Constituency: South Lanarkshire

Personal details
- Born: 4 April 1851 Lanarkshire, Scotland
- Died: 5 September 1929 (aged 78) Brighton, England
- Party: Conservative
- Spouse: Lady Mary Louisa Wellesley Cecil (m. 1880)
- Education: Eton College; Balliol College, Oxford
- Occupation: Civil servant, diplomat, politician

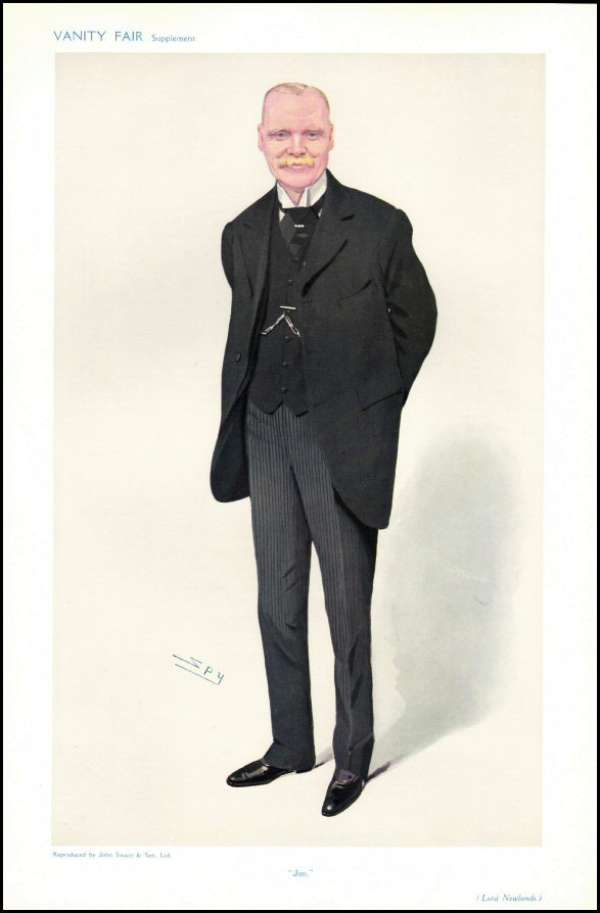
"Jim" Lord Newlands as caricatured by Spy (Leslie Ward) in Vanity Fair, May 1909

James Henry Cecil Hozier, 2nd Baron Newlands (4 April 1851 – 5 September 1929) was a Scottish civil servant, diplomat and politician.

== Biography ==
Hozier was born in Lanarkshire on 4 April 1851, the son of William Hozier, 1st Baron Newlands.

He was educated at Eton College and at Balliol College, Oxford. In 1880, he married Lady Mary Louisa Wellesley Cecil, a daughter of the 3rd Marquess of Exeter.

He served as a Third Secretary in the Diplomatic Service from 1876, as Diplomatic Secretary at the Constantinople Conference, 1876–1877, and as Private Secretary to the Marquess of Salisbury while he was Secretary of State for Foreign Affairs from 1878 to 1880 and again as Prime Minister from 1885 to 1886.

He then entered Parliament and sat as Conservative Member of Parliament for South Lanarkshire from 1886 to 1906. He was Grand Master Mason of Scotland from 1899 to 1903 and was Brigadier of the Royal Company of Archers from 1910. He received the Freedom of the City of Glasgow in 1917.

He died without issue in Brighton on 5 September 1929, and his title became extinct.

== Footnotes ==
Parliament of the United Kingdom
Preceded by John Glencairn Carter Hamilton	Member of Parliament for South Lanarkshire; 1886–1906	Succeeded by Sir Walter Menzies
Honorary titles
Preceded by The Earl of Home	Lord Lieutenant of Lanarkshire; 1915–1921	Succeeded by Sir Robert King Stewart
Masonic offices
Preceded by The Lord Saltoun	Grand Master of the Grand Lodge of Scotland; 1900–1904	Succeeded by Hon. Charles Ramsay
Peerage of the United Kingdom
Preceded by William Hozier	Baron Newlands; 1906–1929	Extinct
