= Clyde Arc =

Bridge in Glasgow, Scotland

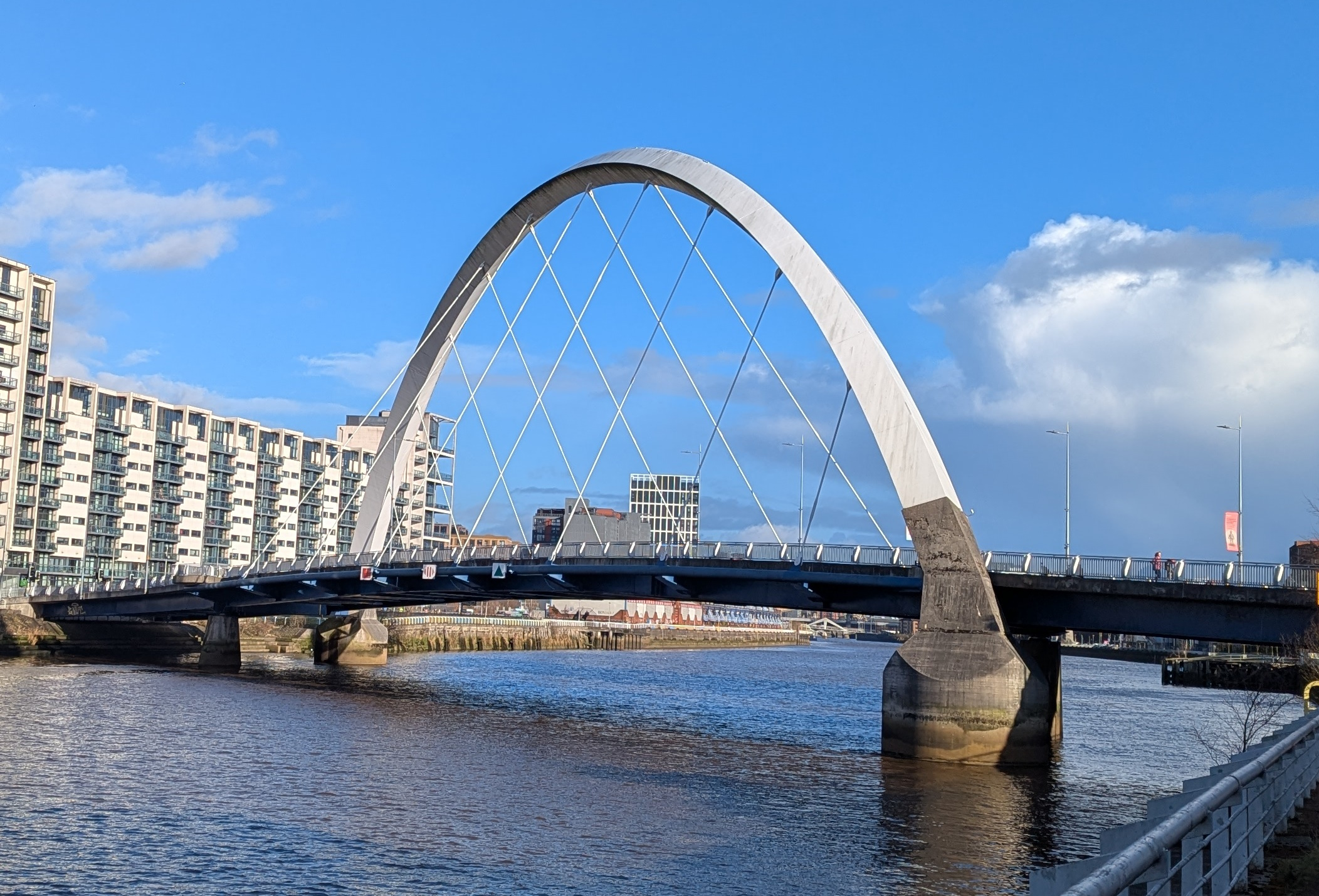
- View of the Clyde Arc from the west
- Coordinates: 55°51′26″N 4°16′57″W
- Crosses: River Clyde
- Locale: Glasgow

Characteristics
- Width: 22 m (72 ft)
- Longest span: 96 m (315 ft)

History
- Construction cost: £20.3 million (Budget)
- Opened: 18 September 2006

Location
- Interactive map of Clyde Arc

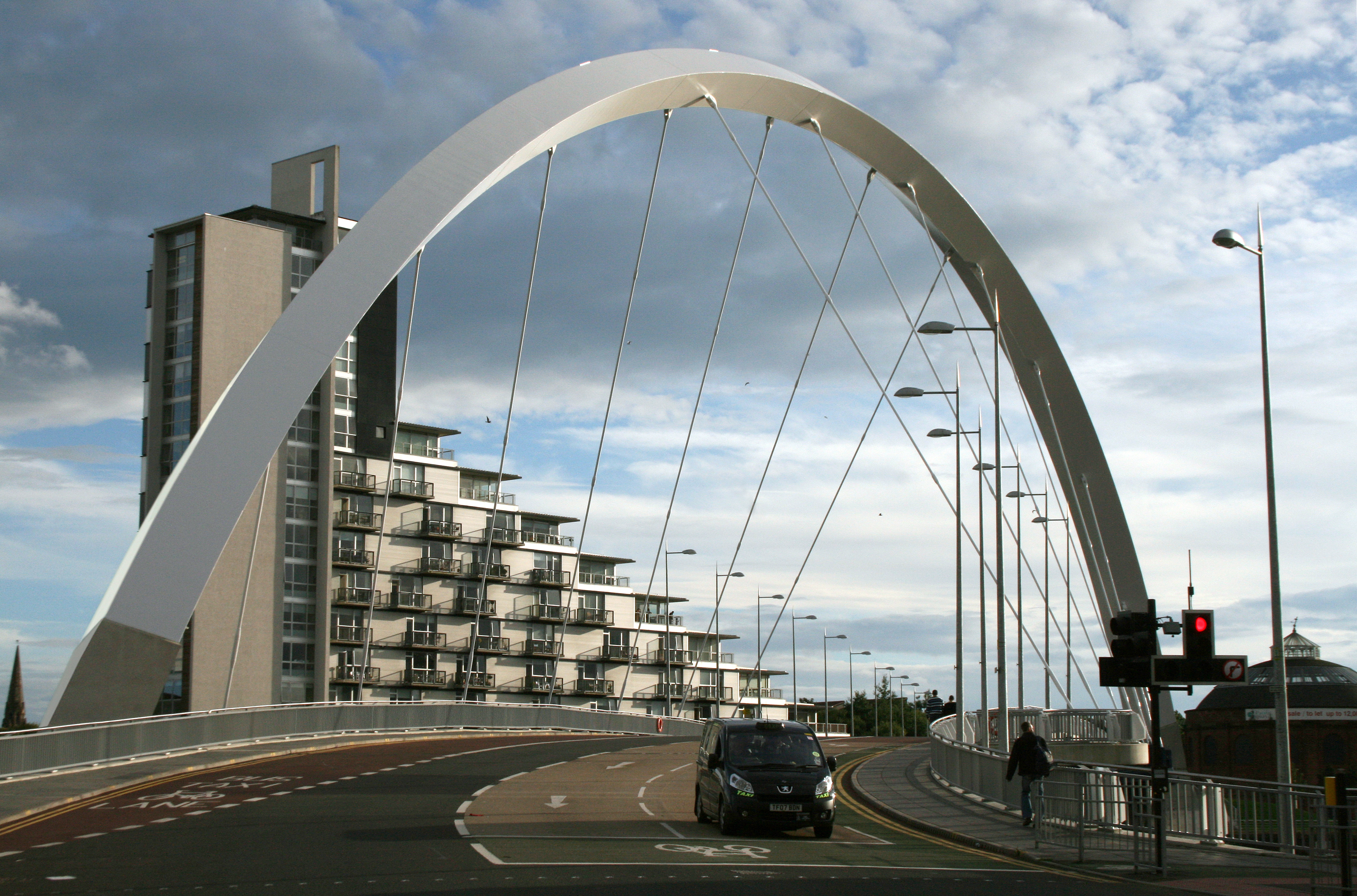
Clyde Arc

The Clyde Arc (known locally as the Squinty Bridge) is a road bridge spanning the River Clyde in Glasgow, Scotland, connecting Finnieston near the SEC Armadillo and SEC with Pacific Quay and Glasgow Science Centre in Govan. Prominent features of the bridge are its innovative curved design, and that it crosses the river at an angle. The Arc is the first city centre traffic crossing over the river built since the Kingston Bridge was opened to traffic in 1970.

The bridge was named the "Clyde Arc" upon its official opening on 18 September 2006. It had been previously known as the "Finnieston Bridge", or the "Squinty Bridge".

== Design ==
The Clyde Arc was designed by Halcrow Group and built by BAM Nuttall. Glasgow City Council instigated the project in conjunction with Scottish Enterprise and the Scottish Government. Piling works for the bridge were carried out from a large floating barge on the Clyde, whilst the bridge superstructure was fabricated offsite. The bridge-deck concrete-slab units were cast at an onsite pre-casting yard. Planning permission was granted in 2003 and construction of the bridge began in May 2005. It was structurally completed in April 2006. The bridge project cost an estimated £20.3M and is designed to last 120 years.

The bridge has a main span of 96 m (315 ft) with two end spans of 36.5 m (120 ft), resulting in a total span of 169 m (554 ft). The design of the main span features a steel arch. The supports for the main span are located within the river with the abutments located behind the existing quay walls. The central navigation height at mean water height is 5.4 m (18 ft).

It was officially opened on 18 September 2006 by Glasgow City Council leader Steven Purcell, although pedestrians were allowed to walk across it the previous two days as part of Glasgow's annual "Doors Open" Weekend.

The bridge connects Finnieston Street on the north bank of the river to Govan Road on the southern bank. The bridge takes four lanes of traffic, two of which are dedicated to public transport and two for private and commercial traffic. There are also pedestrian and cycle paths. The new bridge was built to provide better access to Pacific Quay and allow better access to regeneration areas on both banks of the Clyde. The bridge has been designed to cope with a possible light rapid transit system (light railway scheme) or even a tram system.

The bridge is the first part of several development projects planned to regenerate Glasgow. The £40M Tradeston Bridge was also completed (a further proposed pedestrian bridge linking Springfield Quay with Lancefield Quay was not). The canting basin and Govan Graving Docks next to Pacific Quay are subject to development along with Tradeston and Laurieston. A derelict area of Dalmarnock was used as the 'athletes' village' for the 2014 Commonwealth Games in Glasgow.

== Support hanger failure ==
The bridge was closed between 14 January and 28 June 2008 due to the failure of one support hanger, and cracks found in a second.

On the night of 14 January 2008 the connecting fork on one of the bridge's 14 hangers (supporting cables that transfer the weight of the roadway to the bridge's arch) snapped; Strathclyde Police quickly closed the bridge to traffic. Robert Booth, a spokesman for Glasgow City Council said:

We don't believe the integrity of the bridge is affected. The Clyde Arc is designed to allow for the removal of one of the bridge supports at a time for repair and maintenance without affecting its operation. However, our number one priority is public safety and until we are completely satisfied the bridge is safe to use, it will remain closed.

A detailed inspection on 24 January found a stress fracture in a second support cable stay, like the one which had failed previously. Engineers determined that all of these connectors would have to be replaced; rather than a brief closure the bridge would have to remain closed for six months. In addition traffic on the river below was also halted. In March Nuttall began installing five temporary saddle frames atop the bridge's arch; these allowed the weight of the bridge to be supported without the hangers. This allowed them to replace defective fork connectors at the top and bottom of each hanger.

Repair work in progress

The bridge recommenced on 28 June 2008 with just two of its four lanes in use, having had all the cast steel connectors replaced with milled steel connectors. Once reopened, Glasgow City Council estimated that 6,500 crossings will be made every day using the bridge.

New Civil Engineer reported subcontractor Watson Steel Structures was suing Macalloy, the supplier of the failed connectors, for £1.8 million. Watson alleged components obtained from Macalloy did not meet British Standards or their own specifications; parts were inadequately manufactured, and did not tally with test certificates provided by the firm. Macalloy denied the claim and countered Watson Steel Structures Ltd had only specified minimum yield stress for the components.

== See also ==
- Hulme Arch Bridge
- List of bridges in Scotland
