= Victoria Bridge, Manchester =

Victoria Bridge
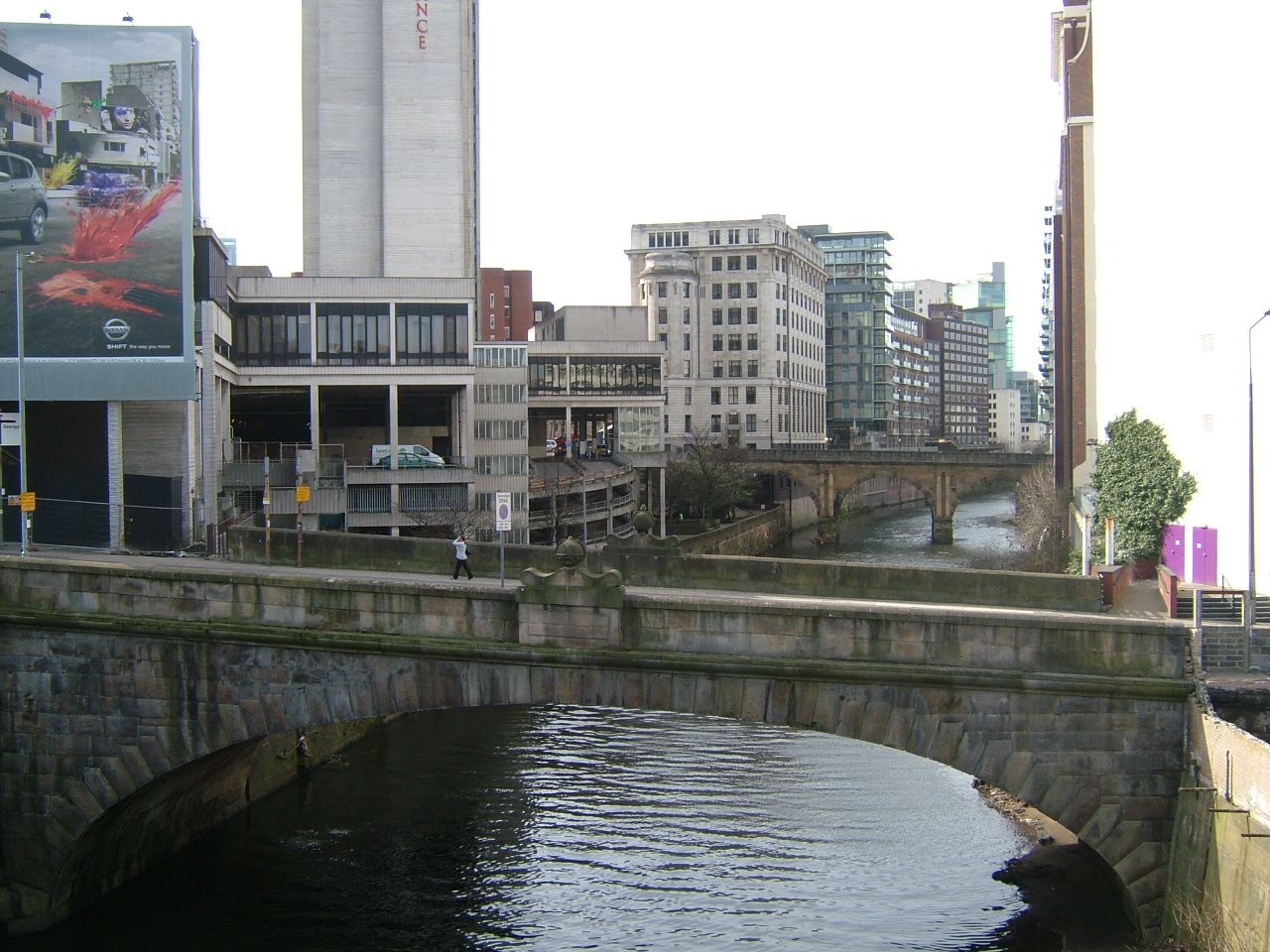
- Coordinates: 53°29′05″N 2°14′45″W
- Carries: Victoria Bridge Street
- Crosses: River Irwell
- Locale: Manchester, England
- Heritage status: Grade II listed structure

Characteristics
- Design: Arch Bridge

History
- Opened: 20 June 1839

Location
- Interactive map of Victoria Bridge

Victoria Bridge is a stone arch bridge in Greater Manchester, England. Completed in 1839 and named after Queen Victoria, it crosses the River Irwell, connecting Salford to Manchester.

The bridge replaced an earlier medieval structure, Salford Old Bridge, which dated from the 14th century. The old bridge was built on the site of an ancient ford, from which Salford took its name. Contemporary accounts of its design are complimentary, but by the 19th century its narrow construction was viewed as an impediment to traffic, and it was demolished. Construction of the new bridge began in 1838 and it was completed about a year later, at a cost of about £20,800. It was opened to traffic on 20 June 1839, although Queen Victoria did not visit it until October 1851.

Victoria Bridge is made from sandstone, and uses a single semi-elliptical arch of about 100 feet to cross the water below. It was declared a Grade II listed building in 1988.

== History ==
=== Salford Old Bridge ===
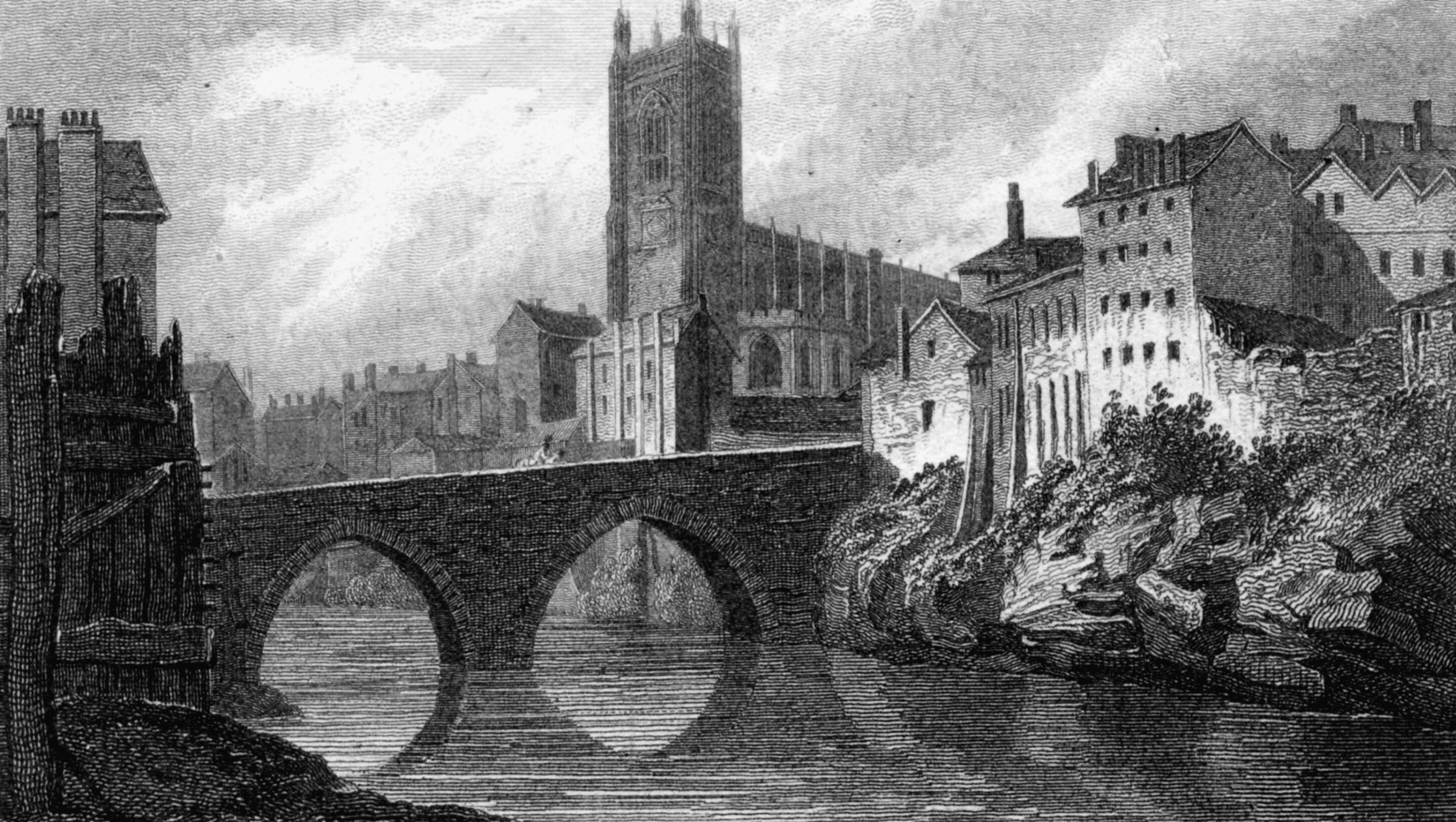
Salford Old Bridge, looking northeast

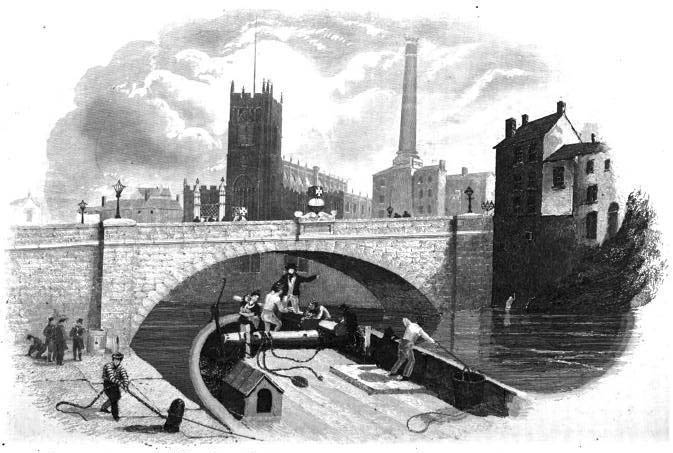
A contemporary illustration of the new bridge

The present structure replaced the 14th-century Salford Old Bridge, at the time the oldest in the region, Salford Old Bridge's exact age is unknown. The Lancashire and Cheshire Antiquarian Society estimated that it was built sometime around 1365 to 1368, as it appears in the will of Thomas del Bothe, a yeoman from Barton who bequeathed it £30. Salford Old Bridge was built at the site of a ford, from which the town took its name; Salford is derived from the Old English word Sealhford, meaning a ford by the willow trees or sallows, which at the time grew alongside the Irwell's banks.

A narrow stone bridge with three gothic arches, it housed a chapel built by del Bothe on the middle pier. This was rebuilt in 1505 and was later used as a jail. The bridge was the site of a notable incident during the English Civil War, when Royalist Salford used it to mount a short-lived siege of Parliamentarian Manchester.

The 16th-century antiquary John Leland called the old bridge "the best of III arches", and referred to del Bothe's building as "a praty litle chapel". A list of bridges published in 1781 lists it as "a firm commodious bridge", widened along the south side in about 1730, and with the jail's removal, on the north side in 1779. (Note: Writing in 1804, Joseph Aston said "Until that period [1778] it was highly dangerous for foot passengers to meet a carriage; and it was often a work of labour for persons not very active, to get over the bridge on a market day, as they were often obliged to take refuge in the angular recesses, which at that time were on both sides of the bridge, to escape from impending danger.) By the 19th century, however, the bridge's narrow design was viewed as an impediment. Its fate was decided at the Quarter Sessions for the Hundred of Salford in October 1836. There it was agreed that it should be replaced, and so in September the following year it was closed (a temporary wooden crossing was provided for pedestrians) and over the next six months, demolished. Bradshaw's Manchester Journal describes its construction as narrow, steeply-sloped and rudimentary, quoting an excerpt from the 27 March 1839 edition of the Manchester Guardian:

On removing the key-stones of the arch on the Salford side, the whole of the masonry from the keystone to the centre pier fell over at once into the river, precipitating three or four of the workmen into the water; but fortunately none of them received any more serious injury than a considerable fright and a thorough ducking. On examining the centre pier, it was found to be quite untouched and unshaken, each of the three arches having merely pressed upon or rested against the outer surfaces of the piers and abutments.

=== Construction ===
The new bridge's first stone was laid on 31 March 1838 by Elkanah Armitage, Boroughreeve of Salford. Inclement weather caused several construction delays, (Note: For one example of these delays, see The Hurricane of Monday, The Manchester Guardian, 9 January 1839, ProQuest 473448160 (subscription required)) but the final stone was laid almost a year later on 23 March 1839, by Sir Humphrey de Trafford, 2nd Baronet. The bridge cost £10,800 to build, although as changes were made to its approaches on both sides of the river, the total cost was £20,800.

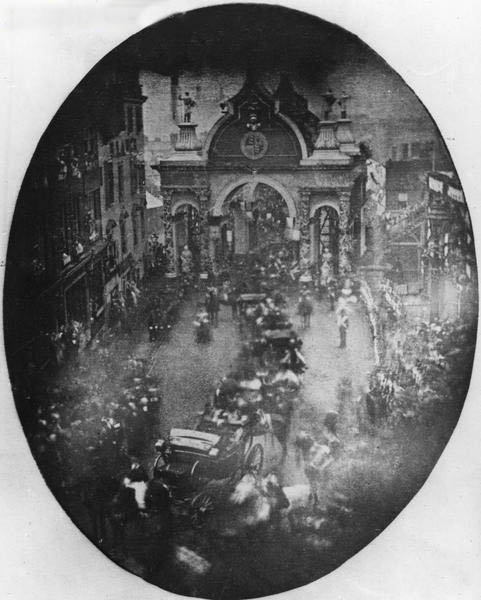
Queen Victoria passing over the bridge in 1851

Victoria Bridge was opened on 20 June 1839, the anniversary of Queen Victoria's accession to the throne. The event drew large crowds, who watched as a procession of soldiers twice crossed the bridge, accompanied by regimental bands playing "God Save the Queen". Men working at the forges in the nearby Victoria Arches used anvils and gunpowder to mimic artillery fire. Flags were placed on the surrounding buildings, while a Union Flag was raised atop Manchester Cathedral. Food and drink was provided for local dignitaries. The bridge was opened to the general public shortly after midday. Queen Victoria crossed the bridge, which was partially covered by a temporary triumphal arch, on her visit to Manchester in October 1851.

The Manchester Guardian declared the new bridge "an ornament to the towns which it unites", and a "highly creditable public work to the parties to whom the management of its erection has been entrusted, and to the present advanced state of pontal architecture."

=== Modern day ===
The road which crosses the bridge, Victoria Bridge Street, admitted traffic in one direction only until 2012. As a consequence of the pedestrianisation of nearby Victoria Street, it was made a two-way street.

== Design ==
The bridge is constructed from sandstone ashlar, some of which may have been quarried in nearby Bury. It crosses the Irwell in a single, semi-elliptical arch with a span of about 100 feet. This is lined with rusticated voussoirs and topped with a straight roll-moulded string course. Two large queen's orbs rest on Grecian scrolls, which themselves sit on two of the bridge's parapets. Four ornate iron gas lamps were included in the bridge's design, forged by Henry Longden of Sheffield, although thieves removed their lead supply pipes, and so the bridge was unlit on the day it opened. It was declared a grade II listed building on 20 June 1988.

The bridge's two keystones are inscribed with the names of Charles Carrington and John Gannon, bridgemaster and contractor respectively, while an inscription on the bridge's northern battlement reads:

This bridge was built at the expense of the inhabitants of the hundred of Salford, upon the site of the Salford Old Bridge of three Gothic arches, erected in the year of our Lord 1365. The first stone was laid in the first year of the reign of Queen Victoria, and the bridge was opened in the third year of Her reign, and in the year of our Lord 1839, and was by Her Majesty's permission called Victoria Bridge.

== See also ==
- Listed buildings in Manchester-M3
- Listed buildings in Salford, Greater Manchester
- Palatine Bridge, Salford
- Blackfriars Bridge, Manchester
- Albert Bridge, Manchester
