= Palatine Bridge, Salford =

Palatine Bridge
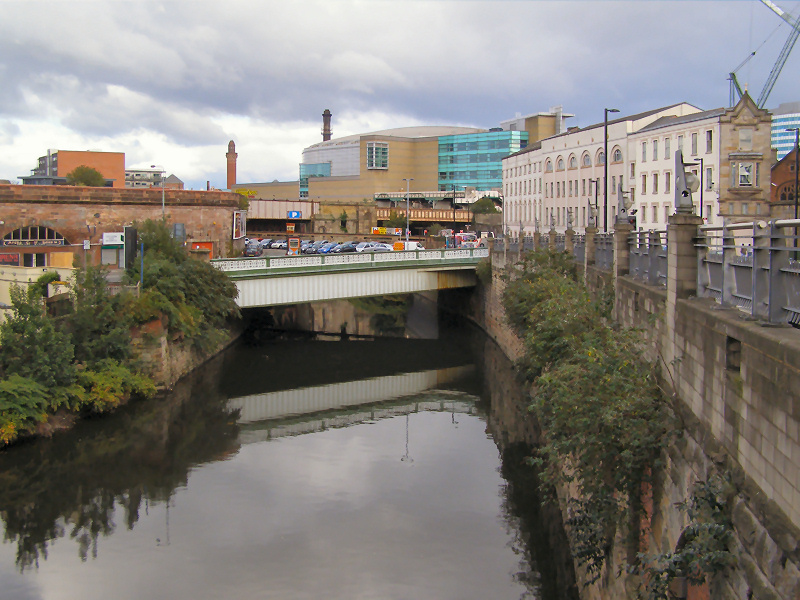
- Coordinates: 53°29′11″N 2°14′42″W
- Carries: Chapel Street
- Crosses: River Irwell
- Locale: Salford, England

History
- Opened: 24 August 1864

Palatine Bridge is a wrought-iron road bridge in Greater Manchester. Opened in 1864 and rebuilt in 1911, it crosses the River Irwell between Salford and Manchester.

== History ==
=== Background ===
A bridge between Chapel Street in Salford and Hunts Bank in Manchester was first proposed in 1858, as a means of improving road links between Salford and Manchester Victoria station, each separated by the River Irwell. When the Lancashire and Yorkshire Railway applied to Parliament to build a railway link between Salford (New Bailey Street) station and Victoria, Salford Corporation opposed the bill, citing the township's poor access to Victoria Station. The railway company was forced by parliamentary committee to compensate the Corporation to the tune of £25,000, to be used to improve the aforementioned transport links.

=== Construction and design ===
The land required on Chapel Street for the Salford approach to the proposed bridge was donated by Samuel Brooks, who as part of the deal insisted that a 150 feet (46 m) abutment was built on the Salford bank of the river, to improve the rateable value of nearby properties.

Designed by W. Radford, Palatine Bridge comprises a single span (125 feet (38 m) on the south side, 88 feet (27 m) on the north side), built from twelve wrought-iron box girders attached to stone abutments. Fixed to these girders, wrought-iron road joints support iron covering plates, which themselves support the pavements and road surface, the latter formed from 4 inches (10 cm) granite cubes. The gradient 1 in 30. The bridge parapets are cast iron and terminate in stone blocks. W. and J. Galloway supplied the ironwork, while A. Pilling supplied the road surface and masonry. The total cost was about £20,000. Toll-free, the bridge was opened on 24 August 1864 by the ex-mayor of Salford, James Worrall.

=== Repairs ===
By 1908 the bridge's condition had deteriorated to a point where the ends of some of its corroded girders could be "turned up like bits of tin." There was some argument as to who should pay for the bridge to be repaired; a clause in the original Act requires that Salford maintain the structure in perpetuity, and Manchester therefore refused to contribute any funds. A bill sent to Parliament by Salford, to enable it to undertake the work required, contains a clause forcing Manchester to contribute half the cost, but this was struck out by a parliamentary committee.

Repairs and strengthening work were made in 1911, by Heenan and Froude of Newton Heath.

== See also ==
- Victoria Bridge, Manchester
- Blackfriars Bridge, Manchester
- Albert Bridge, Manchester
