= Victoria Arches =

Buildings in Manchester, England

Coordinates: 53.4851°N 2.2454°W

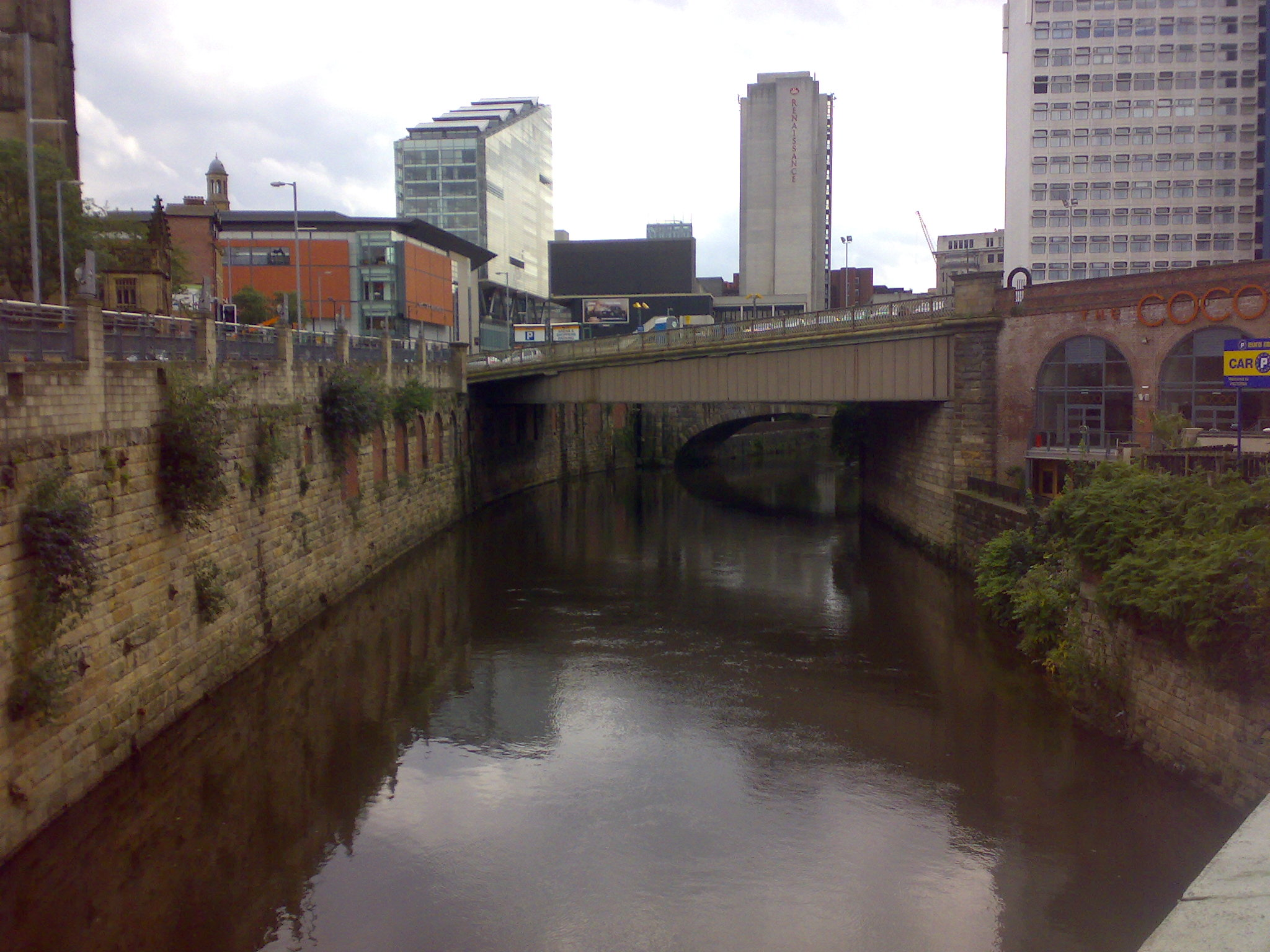
The River Irwell, and the bricked-up landing stages (left)

The Victoria Arches are a series of bricked-up arches built in an embankment of the River Irwell in Manchester. They served as business premises, landing stages for steam packet riverboats and as Second World War air-raid shelters. They were accessed from wooden staircases that descended from Victoria Street.

Regular flooding resulted in the closure of the steam-packet services in the early 20th century, and the arches were later used for general storage. Following the outbreak of the Second World War they were converted into air-raid shelters. They are now bricked up and inaccessible, the staircases having been removed in the latter part of the 20th century.

== History ==
=== Background ===
Sailings to Pomona Gardens were very popular with courting couples, who liked to watch the Eel-catchers, admire views of Trafford Park Woodlands, and gaze at the peaceful farms and orchards. But the increasing smells from the river stopped it all.

— Anon (1993, p. 21.)

The arches were built to create new industrial space, during construction of a new embankment along the River Irwell, built to support a new road. The embankment was completed in 1838.

In 1852 the life-boat Challenger was built and launched from the Arches.

Victorian-era passenger trips along the Irwell were very popular, despite increasing levels of river pollution; in 1860 the Irwell was described as "almost proverbial for the foulness of its waters; receiving the refuse of cotton factories, coal mines, print works, bleach works, dye works, chemical works, paper works, almost every kind of industry." The Rivers Pollution Prevention Act 1876 (39 & 40 Vict. c. 75) was designed to solve such problems, although it was largely ineffective. However, it laid the groundwork for the more draconian legislation that followed.

=== Packets ===
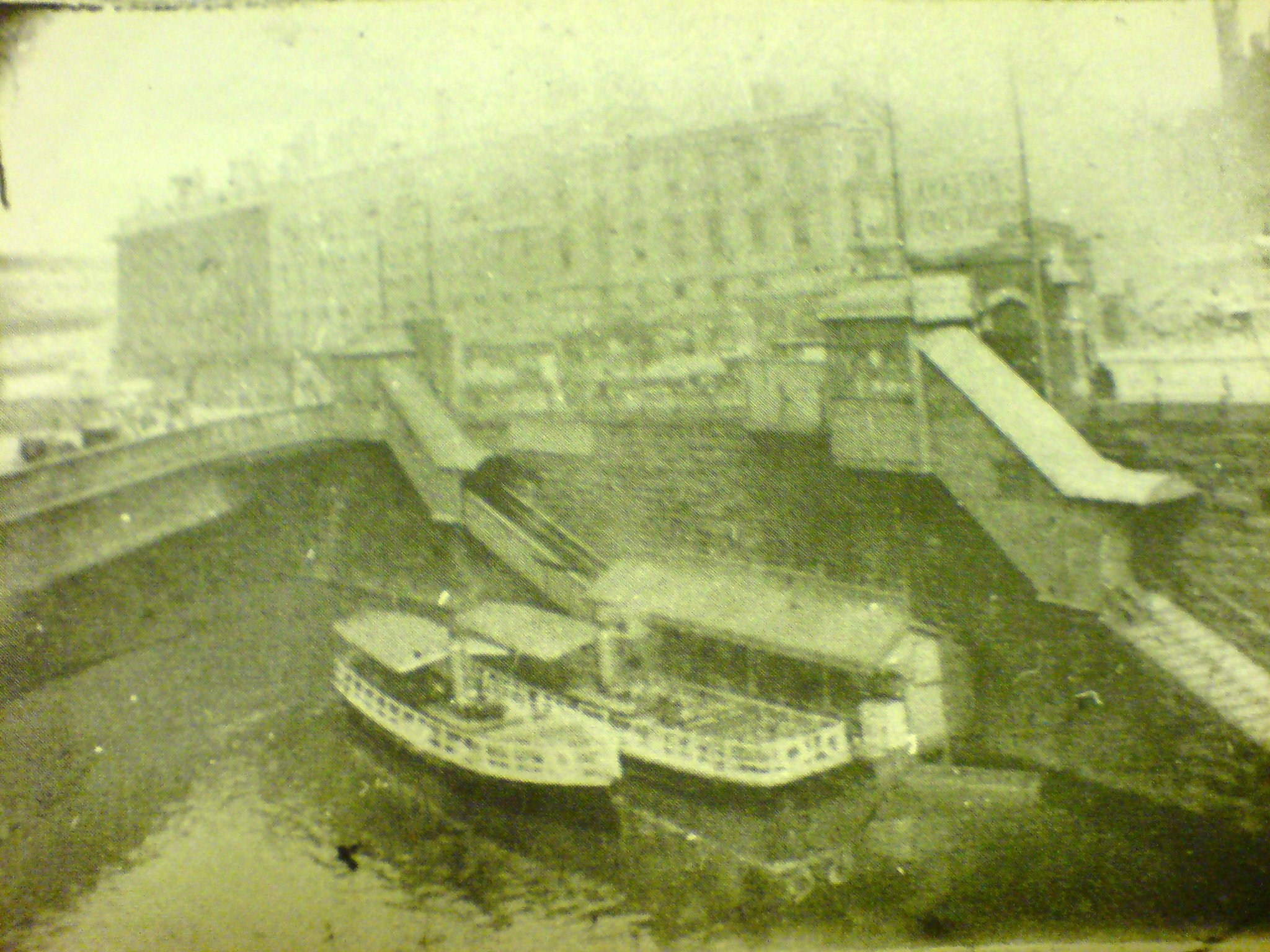
The Cathedral Landing Stage in the 19th century

The Manchester Ship Canal was opened in 1894, and by 1895 the Ship Canal Company, who encouraged passenger traffic, had opened at least one landing stage. Two of its steamers, Shandon and Eagle, are known to have used the landing stages. These boats could carry 900 and 1,100 passengers respectively. During the first half of 1897 more than 200,000 passengers were carried on trips around Manchester Docks, with holiday seasons the most popular periods. Competition for passengers was fierce, with at least two landing stages being operated by different companies. The ferries would occasionally carry musicians, for passenger entertainment.

The landing stages suffered problems with flooding of the Irwell and do not appear to have remained in business for long, being closed in 1906. In Underground Manchester; secrets of the city revealed, author Keith Warrender quotes the recollections of a Manchester City News writer, originally published in 1923:

I became acquainted with those arches in the sixties, for my father, a master joiner and builder, had a workshop there. Two approaches thereto were provided, one by a flight of steps near the Cateaton Street side of the old churchyard, and the other at the corner of Victoria Street and Fennel Street. The arches were lofty and spacious, and had previously been used as a copper and iron works, in connection with which was a tall chimney by the cathedral steps. Part of the chimney was damaged by lightning and the upper part was taken down in 1872. I believe the lower part remained until the old buildings at that point were demolished, not many years ago.

He continues, quoting another letter from the Manchester Evening News in 1960 which says;

At the time I knew it well, 1898, one or two of the arches were used as a battery station by Manchester Electricity Department and two or three others as meter testing and storage departments. Also there was the first testing station for the department where the prototypes of all apparatus used by electricity users in the city were tested. The tunnel was bricked up, about level with the end of Fennel Street. From its gradient it would reach approximately water level at the Irk at the bottom of Hunt's Bank, and the other end would reach street level at St Mary's Gate. The roadway was one cart track wide. The entrance was in Victoria Street alongside the door to a tobacconist's shop near Cathedral Yard.

=== Second World War ===
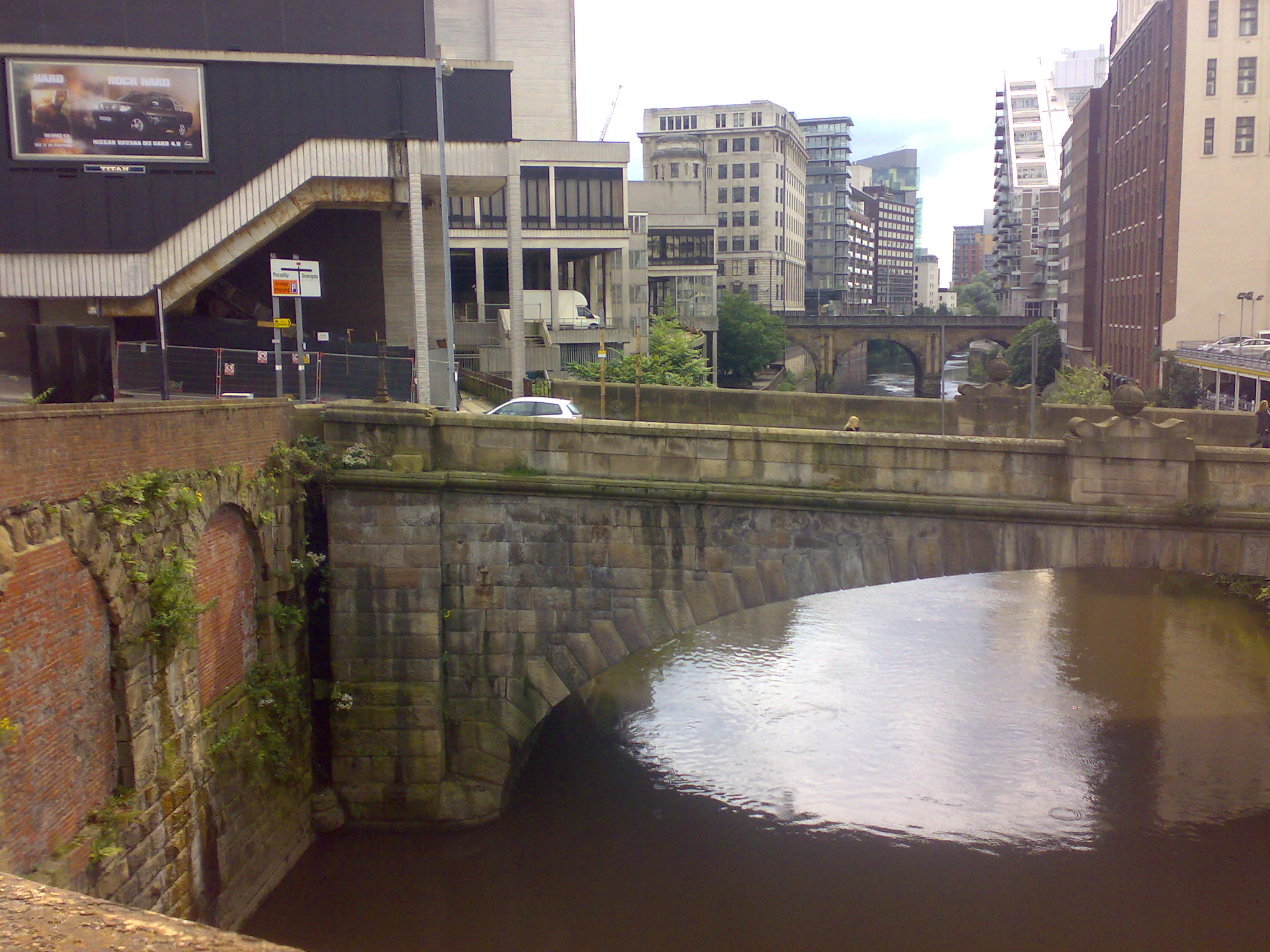
The landing stages along the River Irwell, next to Victoria Bridge

During the Second World War the arches and tunnels surrounding them were converted into air-raid shelters. The conversion took three months and with additional brick blast walls added, cost £10,150, providing shelter for 1,619 people. The cobbled surfaces shown in some of the pictures on the Manchester City Council website show the same network of tunnels before their conversion to air raid shelters. The land covered by the arches included a street, which led at the west end to a wooden bridge over the River Irk. The old road was covered over in an improvement scheme that began in 1833.

The steps and landing stages have been closed to the public for many years. In 1935 less elaborate steps were in place, some of which remained until 1971. Photographs taken in 1972 show the arches to be barred, some are covered with metal grilles. As of 2009 none of the steps remain, and the original Victorian railings along the embankment have been replaced with a stone wall and new railings.

=== Connections ===
The stages also connected with public toilets that used to be in front of the cathedral. While now disused and closed to the public in 1967, Manchester Central Library maps demonstrate their proximity to the landing stages on the river, and both stage and toilets are accessible from one another. Explorers have accessed the landing stages and documented their current condition, including taking photographs. There was an underground entrance to the stages from the premises of Thomas Cook & Son, which stood on the corner of Victoria Bridge. Evidence of the building was reportedly found inside one of the stages in the form of fire-damaged timber purlins, albeit in very poor condition. It has been suggested that the landing stages might be reopened to the public as a tourist attraction.

The arches are visible from the three surrounding bridges, and from the northwest shore of the river. They are all bricked up, some with small ventilation apertures left in place.
