= Albert Bridge =

Albert Bridge may refer to:

- Albert Bridge, Brisbane, a railway bridge across the Brisbane River in Brisbane, Australia
- Albert Bridge, Nova Scotia, a village and a bridge in Nova Scotia, Canada
- Albert Bridge, Datchet, a road bridge in Datchet, Berkshire, England, UK
- Albert Bridge, London, a road bridge in London, England, UK
- Albert Bridge, Manchester, a road bridge in Greater Manchester, England, UK
- Royal Albert Bridge, a railway bridge between Devon and Cornwall, England, UK
- Albert Bridge, Belfast, a road bridge in Belfast, Northern Ireland, UK
- Albert Bridge, Glasgow, a road bridge in Glasgow, Scotland, UK
