= Trinity Bridge, Greater Manchester =

Footbridge in Greater Manchester, United Kingdom

Trinity Bridge
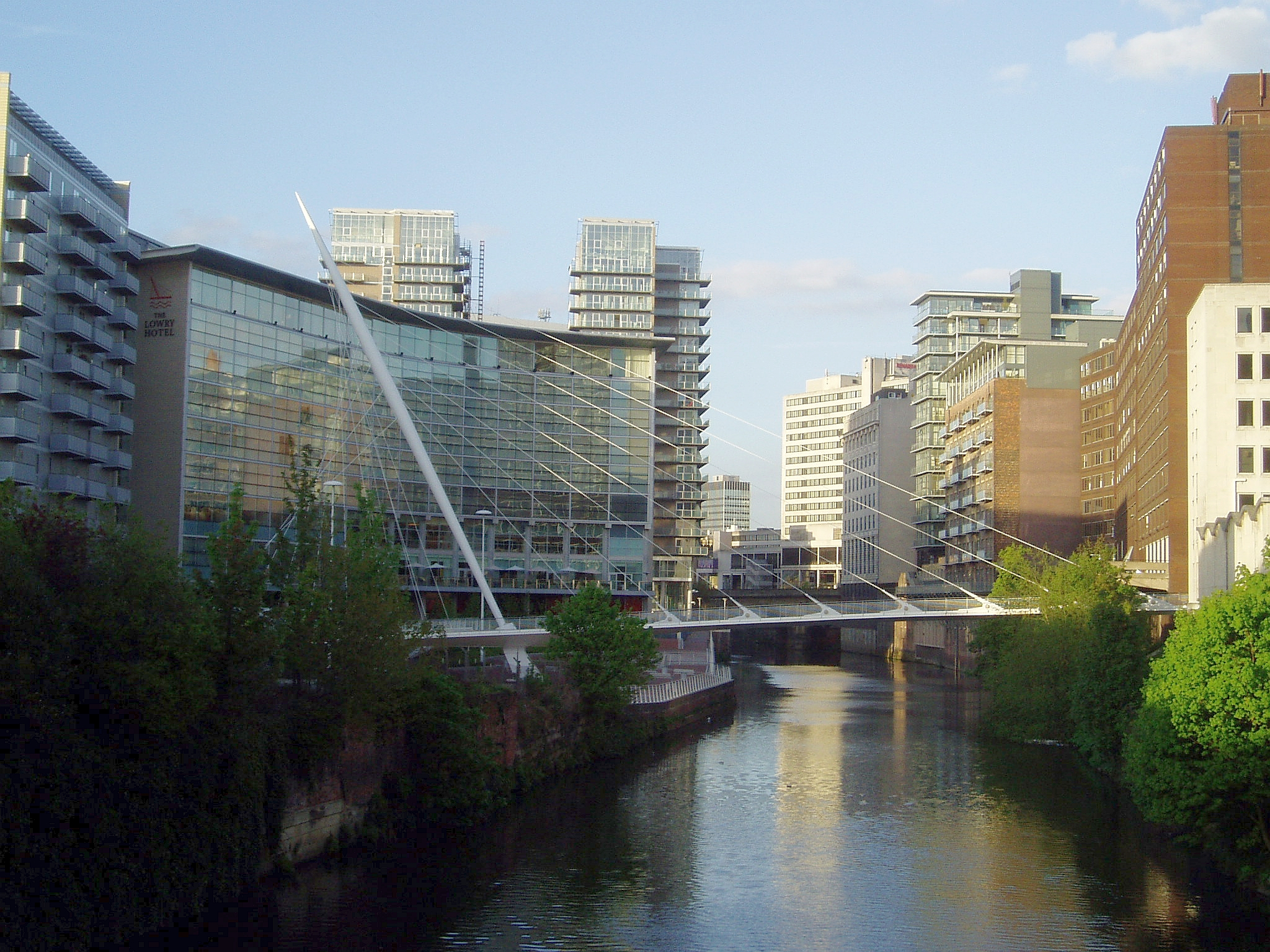
- Trinity Bridge
- Coordinates: 53.4825°N 2.2509°W
- Carries: Pavement
- Crosses: River Irwell
- Locale: Manchester and Salford, Greater Manchester, United Kingdom

Characteristics
- Design: Cantilever spar cable-stayed bridge by Santiago Calatrava

History
- Construction end: 1995

Location
- Interactive map of Trinity Bridge

Trinity Bridge is a three-way footbridge which crosses the River Irwell and links the two cities of Manchester and Salford in Greater Manchester, England. It was designed by renowned Spanish architect, Santiago Calatrava and was completed in 1995. It was one of Calatrava's earliest bridge works and remains the only project he has completed in the United Kingdom.

== History ==
Trinity Bridge was designed by Spanish architect Santiago Calatrava, and was one of his earliest bridge works. The bridge has a typical Calatrava design utilising straight white lines as a structure, and is dominated by the rotund pylon which rises to 41m. The bridge crosses the River Irwell, which marks the boundary between Manchester and Salford. The bridge was re-painted and examined in 2010 as part of the 15-year maintenance programme.

The bridge was constructed by Dew Group Limited (formerly George Dew & Company Limited) of Oldham, Lancashire.

== Gallery ==
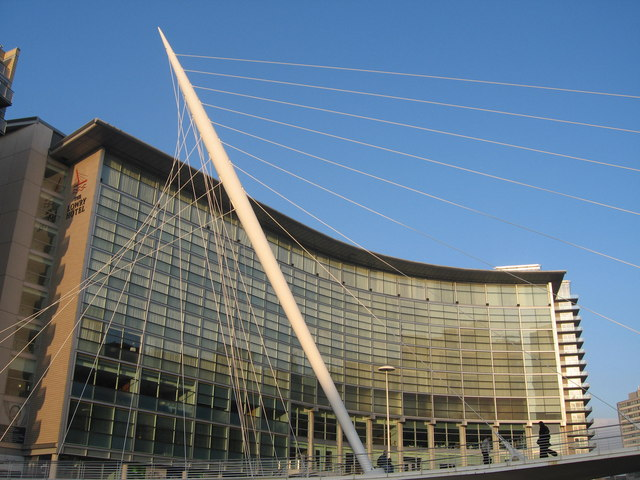
Detail of Trinity Bridge's structure.

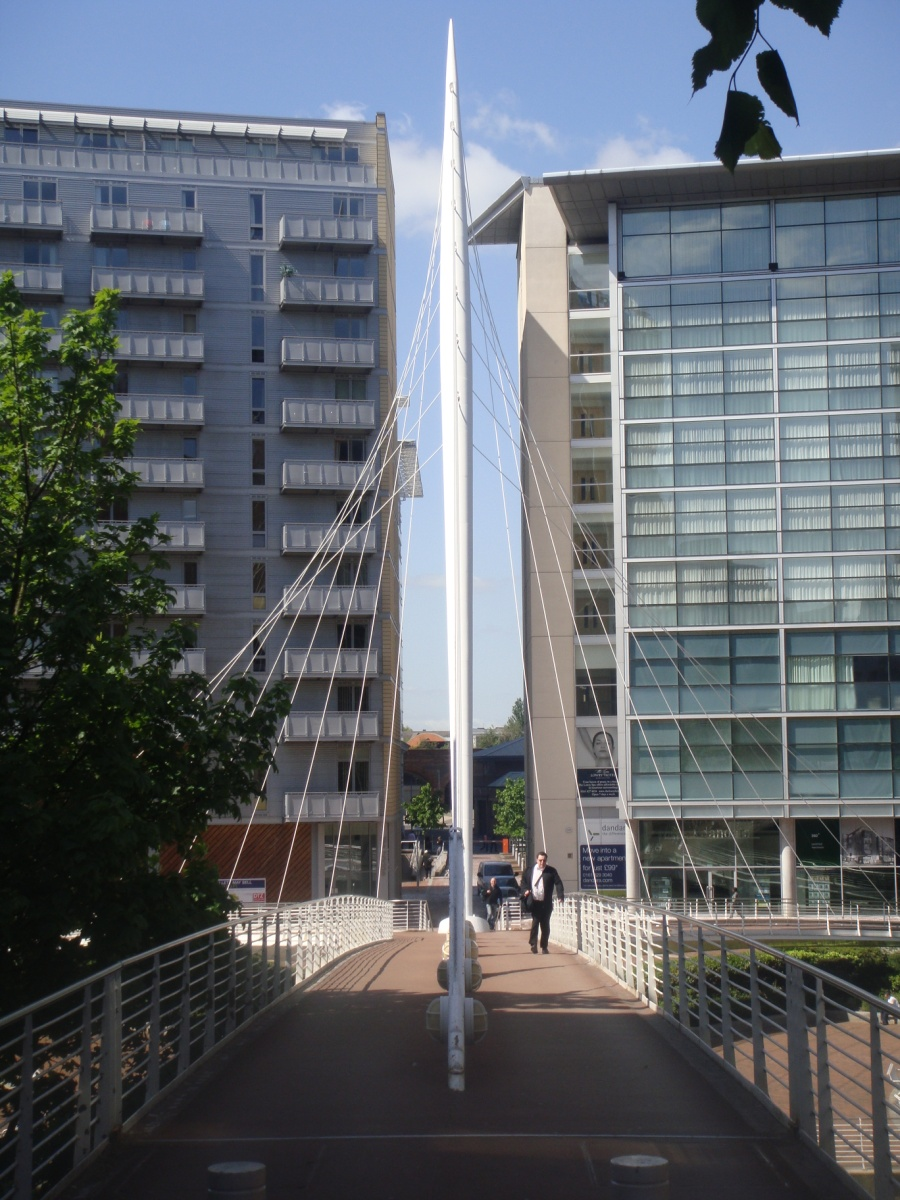
Looking across Trinity Bridge.

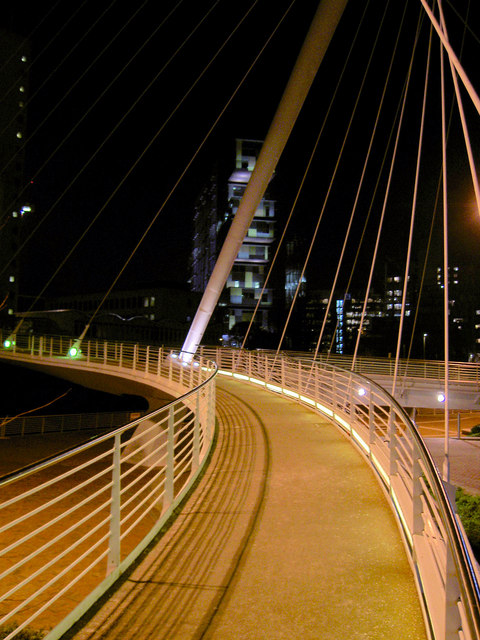
Trinity Bridge at night.

== See also ==
- List of bridges in the United Kingdom
