= Blackfriars Bridge, Manchester =

Blackfriars Bridge
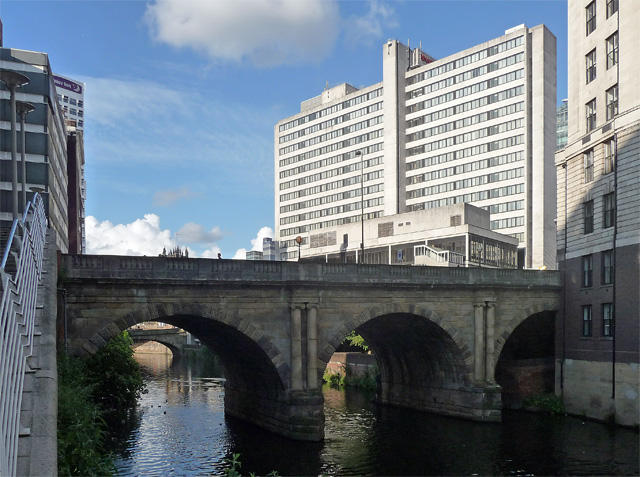
- Coordinates: 53°29′01″N 2°14′52″W
- Carries: Blackfriars Street
- Crosses: River Irwell
- Locale: Manchester, England
- Heritage status: Grade II listed structure

Characteristics
- Design: Arch bridge

History
- Designer: Thomas Wright
- Opened: 1 August 1820; 204 years ago

Blackfriars Bridge is a stone arch bridge in Greater Manchester, England. Completed in 1820, it crosses the River Irwell, connecting Salford to Manchester.

It replaced an earlier wooden footbridge, built in 1761 by a company of comedians who performed in Salford, and who wanted to grant patrons from Manchester access to their theatre. The old bridge was removed in 1817. The new design, by Thomas Wright of Salford, was completed in June 1820, and opened on 1 August that year. The bridge is built from sandstone and uses three arches to cross the river. To obscure the then badly polluted river from view, at some point in the 1870s its original stone balustrade was replaced with cast iron. In 1991 this was replaced with stone-clad reinforced concrete.

The act of Parliament that enabled its construction allowed for its owners to charge a toll for crossing the bridge, but this arrangement was brought to an end in March 1848. Blackfriars Bridge was declared a Grade II listed building in 1988.

== History ==
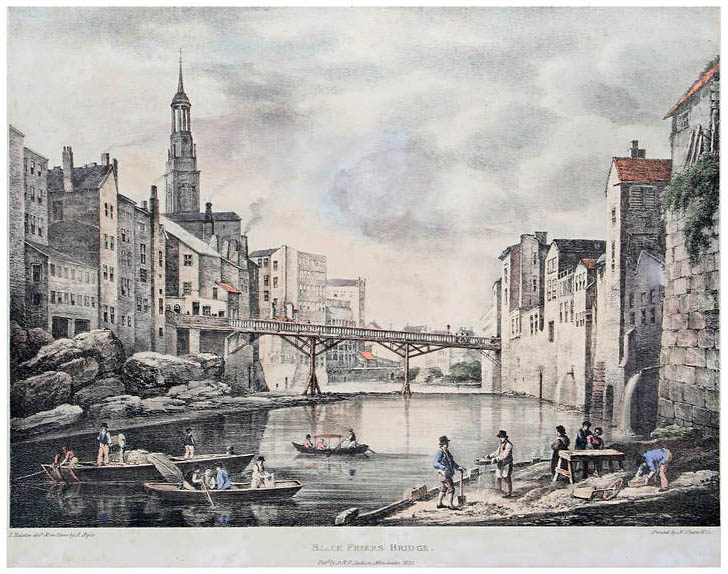
Blackfriars Bridge (1831–1834) by Agostino Aglio

The current Blackfriars Bridge replaced an earlier, wooden structure, dating from 1761. This was erected by a company of comedians keen to allow people from Manchester to easily cross the Irwell, to visit the Riding School on Water Street in Salford, where they performed. For the rest of its life it was maintained at the public's expense. A series of 29 steps (Note: Some sources, for instance, Collectanea Relating to Manchester and its Neighbourhood (1866) say there were 39 steps.) led from the Manchester side of the river down to its flagged surface. It was named Blackfriars Bridge, as Blackfriars Bridge in London was then being built.

Blackfriars Bridge (Manchester) Act 1817
- Act of Parliament
- Parliament of the United Kingdom
- Long title: An Act for building a Bridge across the River Irwell, from Water Street, in the Township of Salford, to Saint Mary's Gate, in the Township of Manchester, all in the County of Lancaster, and for making proper Avenues thereto.
- Citation: 57 Geo. 3. c. lviii

Dates
- Royal assent: 27 June 1817

Text of statute as originally enacted

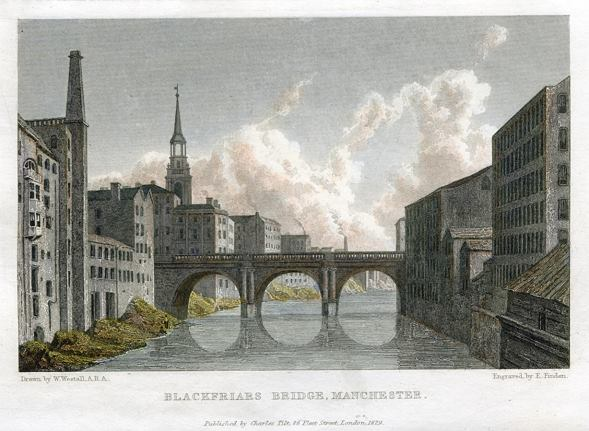
Engraving by Edward Finden, c.1830

The old bridge was narrow, suitable for pedestrians only and liable to flooding. An act of Parliament, (Note: 57 Geo. 3. c. lviii "Act for building a bridge across the river Irwell, from Water Street, in the township of Salford, to St. Mary's Gate, in the township of Manchester, and for making proper Avenues thereto.") the Blackfriars Bridge (Manchester) Act 1817 (57 Geo. 3. c. lviii) enabled its replacement by a superior structure. The Company of Proprietors of the Blackfriars Bridge were empowered to raise funds for the bridge's construction, and allowed to charge tolls to recoup their investment, maintain the bridge and pay off any further debts. The proprietors were also allowed to earn interest on surplus funds, but tolls were to cease once the bridge and the mortgages taken out to fund it, were paid off. As per the act, they raised £17,700 in shares of £50 each, and obtained mortgages for an additional £12,000, but this proved insufficient; they therefore borrowed a further £3,225.

A competition was held to produce designs for the new bridge, which would be required to carry more traffic than the existing structure. Prizes of £150 and £100 were offered for the first and second best designs. William Fairbairn entered with a design for a single-span cast iron bridge. His employer at the time, Thomas Hewes, was also an entrant. Thomas Wright of Salford won the competition with a three-arched stone bridge complete with Ionic columns. The old wooden structure was taken down in 1817, and construction on the new bridge began on 4 January 1819. The keystone was laid by J. E. Scholes, boroughreeve of Salford, on 17 June 1820, and the bridge was opened on 1 August.

The bridge's tollgate was removed on 10 March 1848. At a meeting of the committee for the removal of the bridge tolls, the bridge's creditors agreed to give up any interest in the structure; the remaining surplus of funds was used to purchase a "token of respect" for the committee's chairman, Thomas Chadwick.

== Design ==
Blackfriars Bridge is a sandstone ashlar and cast-iron construction, crossing the water below in three classical-style semicircular arches. The easternmost end of the bridge is partly embedded in the river bank. The central arch has paired Ionic pilasters on each side. The voussoirs on each arch use vermiculated rustication. At some point during the 1870s the bridge's open balustrade was replaced with cast iron, to remove the badly polluted river from view. In 1991 this was replaced with stone-clad reinforced concrete, partially restoring the bridge to its original appearance. It lies within the Parsonage Gardens Conservation Area, and was granted Grade II listed status on 4 February 1988.

== See also ==
- Listed buildings in Manchester-M3
- Listed buildings in Salford, Greater Manchester
- Palatine Bridge, Salford
- Victoria Bridge, Manchester
- Albert Bridge, Manchester
