= Albert Bridge, Manchester =

Albert Bridge
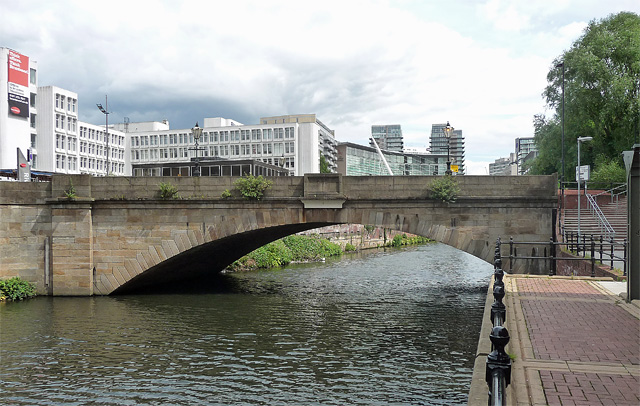
- Coordinates: 53°28′54″N 2°15′11″W
- Carries: Bridge Street
- Crosses: River Irwell
- Locale: Manchester, England
- Heritage status: Grade II listed structure

Characteristics
- Design: Skew arch bridge

History
- Designer: George W. Buck
- Opened: 26 August 1844; 180 years ago

Albert Bridge is a Grade II listed skew arch bridge in Greater Manchester, England. A replacement for an earlier structure, New Bailey Bridge, it was completed in 1844. It crosses the River Irwell, connecting Salford to Manchester.

An 1843 investigation of the earlier structure, built between 1783 and 1785, revealed that it was in such poor condition it would have to be completely replaced. A special committee decided on a design by George W. Buck, costing about £9,000. A temporary footbridge was provided while the new bridge was being built, although this was temporarily destroyed during a flood. In a separate incident, a construction worker was killed by falling masonry.

The new bridge was opened on 26 August 1844. The first vehicle to cross was a donkey cart, from Manchester.

== History ==
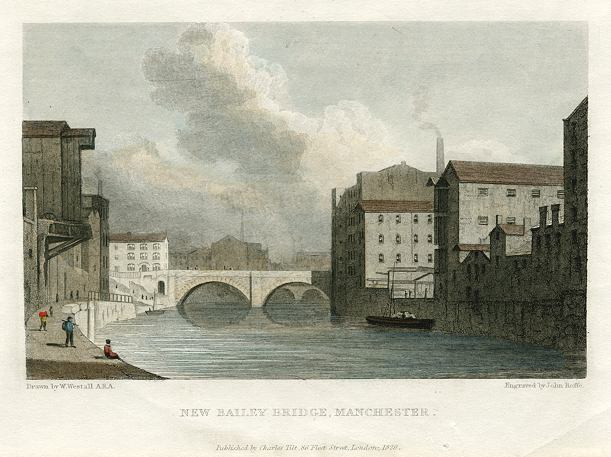
New Bailey Bridge, c.1830

As with the nearby Blackfriars and Victoria bridges, Albert Bridge replaced an earlier structure, New Bailey Bridge. This was built by subscription in shares of £40, between 1783 and 1785. Road users paid a toll to cross the bridge, allowing those who funded it (Note: An old document presented to the Manchester Guardian a few days before the Albert Bridge opening ceremony lists Thomas Butterworth Bayley, Matthew Fletcher (possibly Matthew Fletcher of Wet Earth Colliery), Thomas Philips, Peter Wright, James Bateman, Daniel Whittaker and John Varley, and masons Charles Jones and Jesse Broad of Manchester as contractors.) to recoup their investment of about £1,500, plus interest of about 7.5 per cent. The last toll was paid on 31 January 1803, following which the bridge became free for all to use. New Bailey Bridge was built from stone and used two (Note: Some contemporary sources erroneously state that three arches were used; such statements may include the smaller towpath arch on the Salford bank of the river.) arches to cross the Mersey and Irwell Navigation. A smaller arch on the Manchester bank of the river crossed a towpath, giving access to the Duke of Bridgewater's quay. Two six-foot wide flagged pavements were provided for pedestrian use, on either side of a road 23 feet 11 inches wide.

By 1843 the bridge's condition was perilous, prompting magistrates at an annual session in Preston to investigate its future. A court of about 30 magistrates decided to pull down the almost 59-year-old bridge and replace it with a stone structure about 60 feet wide. A committee was formed, and three estimates were offered: two stone bridges costing £9,700 and £9,640 respectively, and an iron bridge costing £9,400. The committee decided to accept a separate plan by George W. Buck, of a stone and brick bridge costing about £9,000. Buck advertised for contractors to submit tenders in the Manchester Guardian in April 1843. An advertisement in the Manchester Guardian announced the closure of the old bridge for 26 June 1843.

Bowers and Murray of Liverpool were the main contractors, with Sugden and Redfern of Manchester subcontracted for the stonework. A temporary pedestrian footbridge was constructed while the works were underway, although this was destroyed by floating debris when the Irwell flooded in October 1843 (a replacement was built). Another serious accident occurred during the following January, when part of a stone block being lowered by crane broke off, killing a man working below.

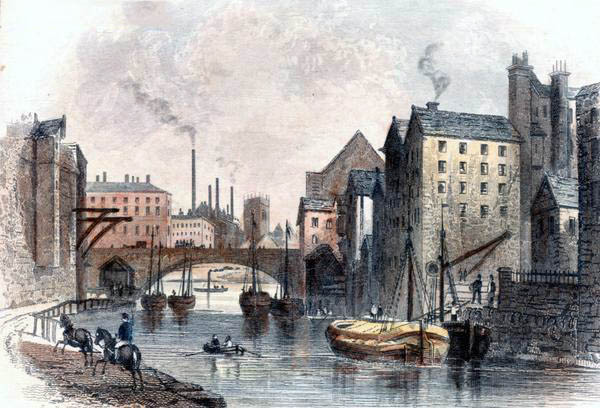
Albert Bridge, 1854

The footpath on the bridge's north side was opened on 16 August 1844, coinciding with the closure of the temporary footbridge, and ten days later the new bridge was fully opened. 60 feet wide, it uses a skew arch of 110 feet 9¼ inches to cross about 106 feet of water. Its 3-foot-thick arch is 20 feet tall and built from Bolton stone, and at the centre is about 30 feet above the river bed. The keystone weighs about three tons. Four cast iron lampposts provide illumination. Improvements were also made to the bridge's approaches, paid for by Manchester and Salford and costing an estimated £3,000 and £1,000 respectively.

An opening ceremony was held, with dignitaries from both towns crossing the bridge in a large procession. Military bands played music as the mayors of Manchester and Salford saluted each other, before they approached a long table filled with refreshments. William Garnett, chairman of the bridge committee, gave a speech in which he praised recent improvements to public rights of way and local bridges, and officially named the new bridge. Alexander Kay and William Lockett, mayors of Manchester and Salford, also spoke, as did other local dignitaries. The first vehicle to cross the bridge was a donkey cart from Manchester.

Albert Bridge was declared a Grade II listed building on 20 June 1988.

== See also ==
- Listed buildings in Salford, Greater Manchester
- Palatine Bridge, Salford
