= River Irwell =

River in Lancashire and Greater Manchester, United Kingdom

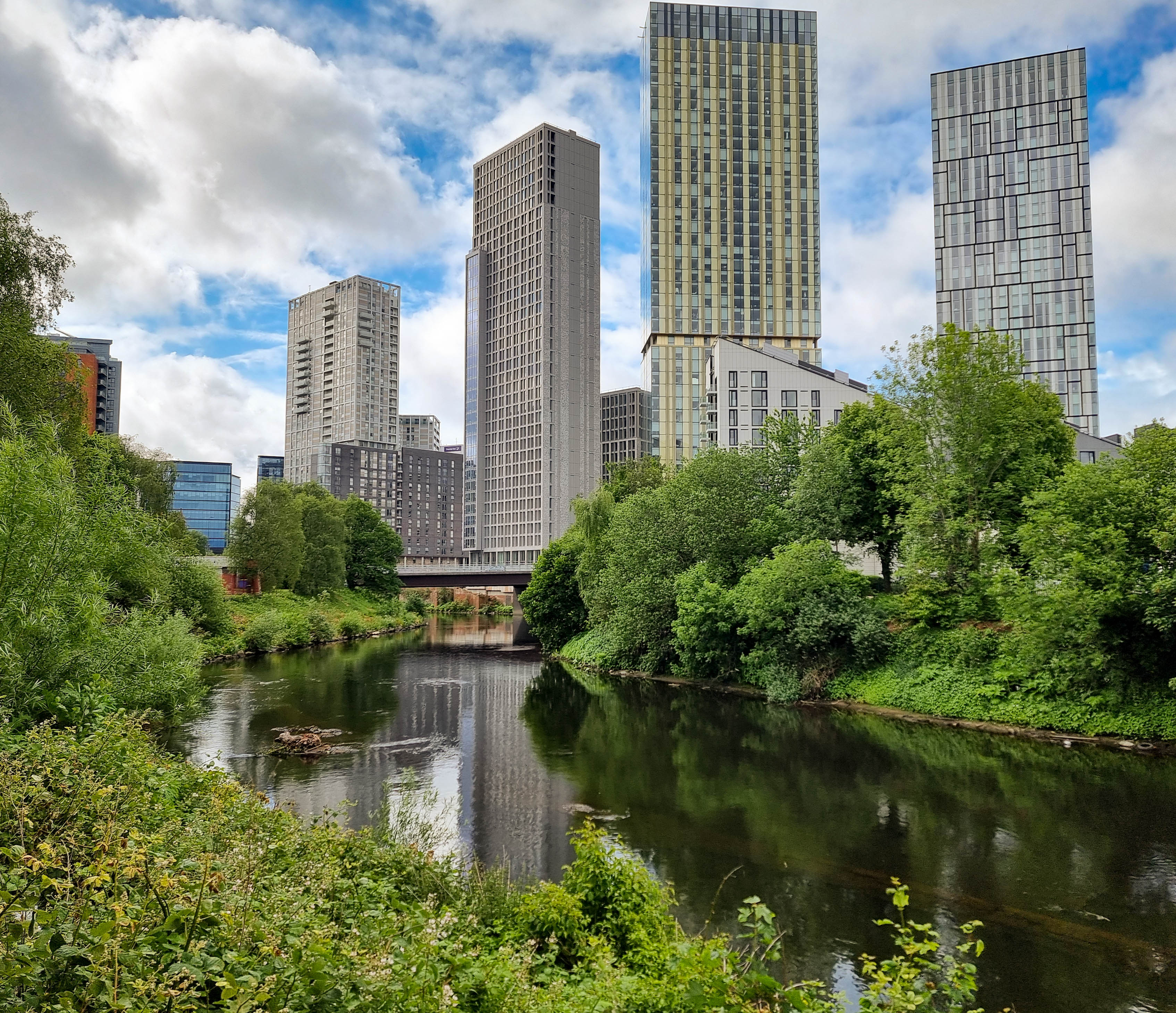
- The River Irwell at Salford

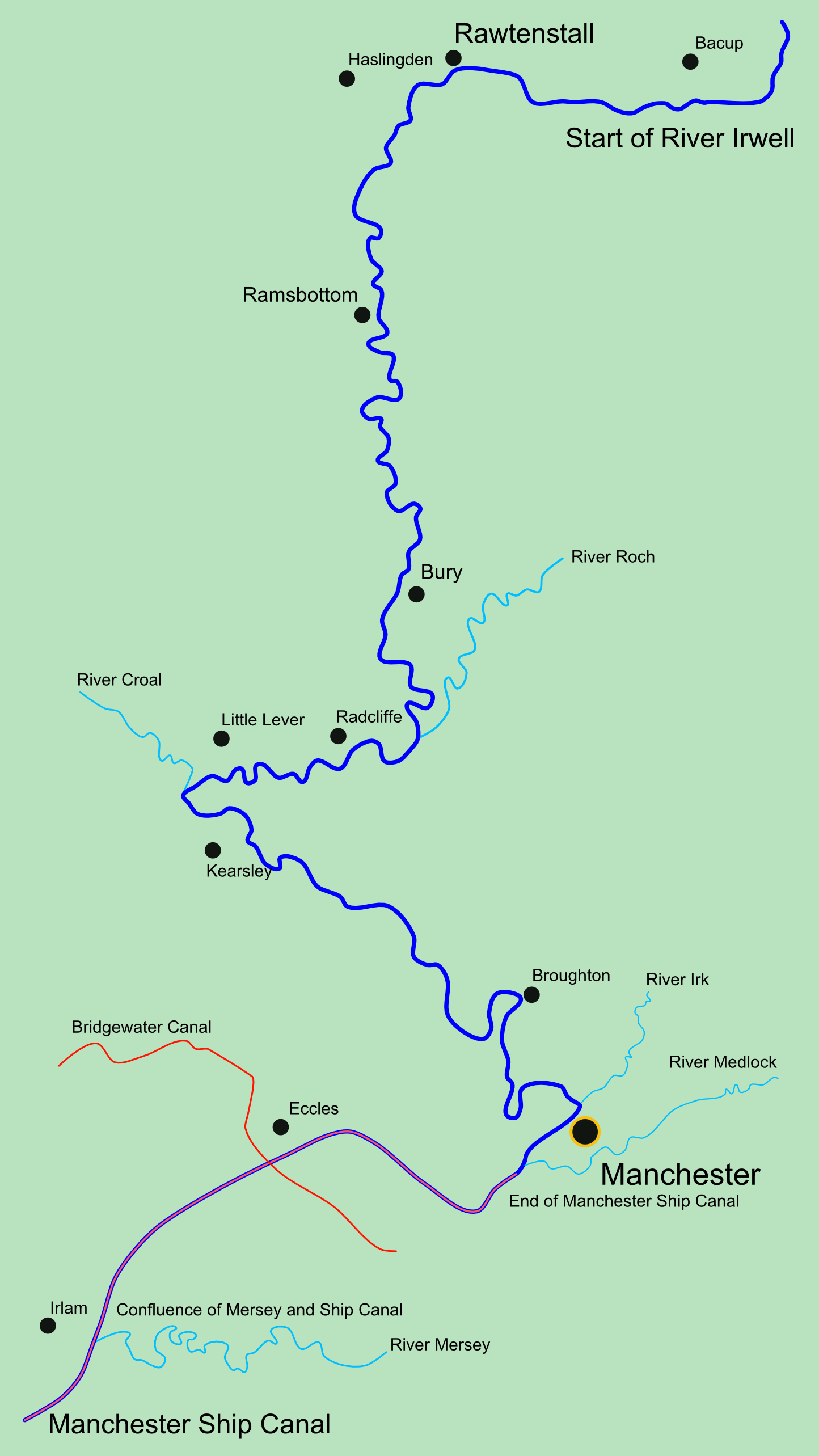

Location
- Country: United Kingdom
- Constituent country: England
- Region: North West England

Physical characteristics
- Source: Irwell Springs
  - location: Deerplay Moor, Cliviger, Lancashire
  - coordinates: 53°44′10″N 2°11′59″W
  - elevation: 400 m (1,300 ft)
- Mouth: River Mersey
  - location: Manchester Ship Canal, Irlam
- Length: 63 km (39 mi)
- Discharge
  - location: Adelphi Weir
  - average: 17.72 m^{3}/s (626 cu ft/s)

Basin features
- Tributaries
  - left: Croal
  - right: Roch, Irk, Medlock

The River Irwell (/ˈɜːrwɛl/ UR-wel) is a tributary of the River Mersey in north-west England. It rises at Irwell Springs on Deerplay Moor, approximately 1 1/2 miles (2.5 kilometres) north of Bacup and flows southwards for 39 mi (63 km) to meet the Mersey near Irlam Locks. The Irwell marks the boundary between Manchester and Salford, and its lower reaches have been canalised and now form part of the Manchester Ship Canal.

In the 17th and 18th centuries, the Irwell's lower reaches were a trading route that became part of the Mersey and Irwell Navigation. In the late 19th century, the river's course downstream of Manchester was permanently altered by the construction of the Manchester Ship Canal which opened in 1896. The canal turned Manchester and Salford into a major inland seaport and led to the development of Trafford Park, which became the largest industrial estate in Europe. Further changes were made in the 20th and 21st centuries to prevent flooding in Manchester and Salford, including the construction of the Anaconda Cut in 1970 and the River Irwell Flood Defence Scheme in 2014.

The river became severely polluted by industrial waste during the Industrial Revolution, but in the second half of the 20th century a number of initiatives were implemented to improve water quality, restock it with fish and create a diverse environment for wildlife. Stretches of the river flowing through Manchester and Salford have attracted large-scale investment in business and residential developments, such as Salford Quays, and other parts have become important wildlife havens. The Irwell is used for recreational activities, such as pleasure cruising, rowing, racing, swimming and fishing.

== Course ==
From its source to the confluence with the River Mersey the Irwell is about 39 miles (63 km) long. Rising on the moors above Cliviger near the sources of the Lancashire River Calder and the Yorkshire River Calder, it flows south through Bacup, Rawtenstall, Ramsbottom and Bury before merging with the River Roch near Radcliffe. Turning west, it joins the River Croal near Farnworth before turning southeast through Kearsley, Clifton and the Agecroft area of Pendlebury. It then meanders around Lower Kersal and Lower Broughton. It bisects Salford and Manchester, joining the rivers Irk and Medlock, and then turns west toward Irlam, as part of the Manchester Ship Canal. Its course ends just beyond Irlam Locks, where it empties into the Mersey near Flixton.

== Natural history ==
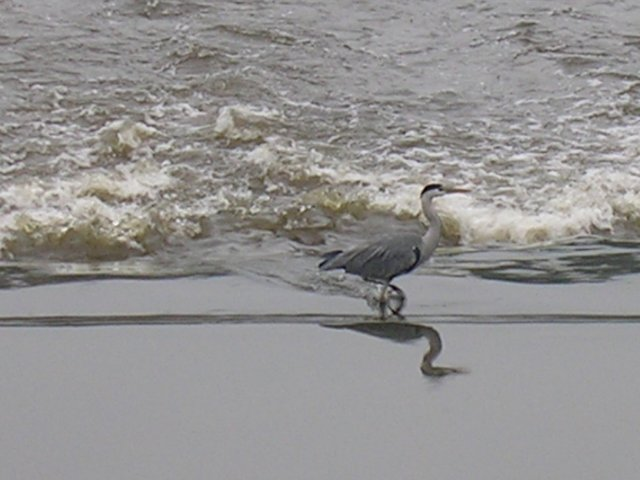
Grey heron wading in the Irwell, near Bury

Until the early 19th century the Irwell was well-stocked with fish and other wildlife, with people living near Manchester Cathedral using its water for drinking and other domestic purposes. But during the Industrial Revolution, increasing levels of pollution caused by waste products discharged into the river by local industries proved fatal to wildlife, with fish stocks disappearing completely by about 1850. This situation abated somewhat during the 20th century, with a slow improvement in water quality leading to fresh populations of roach, bream and chub, and sightings of brown trout have become increasingly common.

Problems with water quality in some of the former Manchester Docks basins became apparent with the redevelopment of Salford Quays. Years of runoff from sewers and roads had accumulated in the slow running waters of this area and decomposition of organic matter was causing oxygen depletion. In 2001, a compressed air injection system was introduced. This raised the oxygen levels in the water by up to 300%, improving the water quality to such an extent that the number of invertebrate species present increased to more than 30, including freshwater shrimp. Spawning and growth rates of fish species such as roach and perch have also increased, and are now amongst the highest in England.

Two Sites of Special Scientific Interest (SSSIs) are located close to the banks of the Irwell, near to its confluence with the River Croal at Moses Gate Country Park near Bolton. The first is at Nob End, an 88 800 m^{2} site which has been designated because of its biological interest, based on the predominance of flora typical of limestone grassland including some nationally rare herbs and orchids. Nob End is also designated as a Local Nature Reserve (LNR). The second site is Ashclough, which is a site of geological interest. These two SSSIs are among the 21 found in Greater Manchester. In Salford the river flows through Clifton Country Park and Kersal Dale Country Park, both of which have been designated as LNRs.

Grey herons, cormorants, mute swans, kingfishers and many species of geese and ducks are regularly sighted on the river. The Manchester Ship Canal near Salford Quays is one of the top ten sites in Britain for diving ducks, providing a winter home to approximately 3,000 common pochard and 2,000 tufted ducks.

== Geology ==
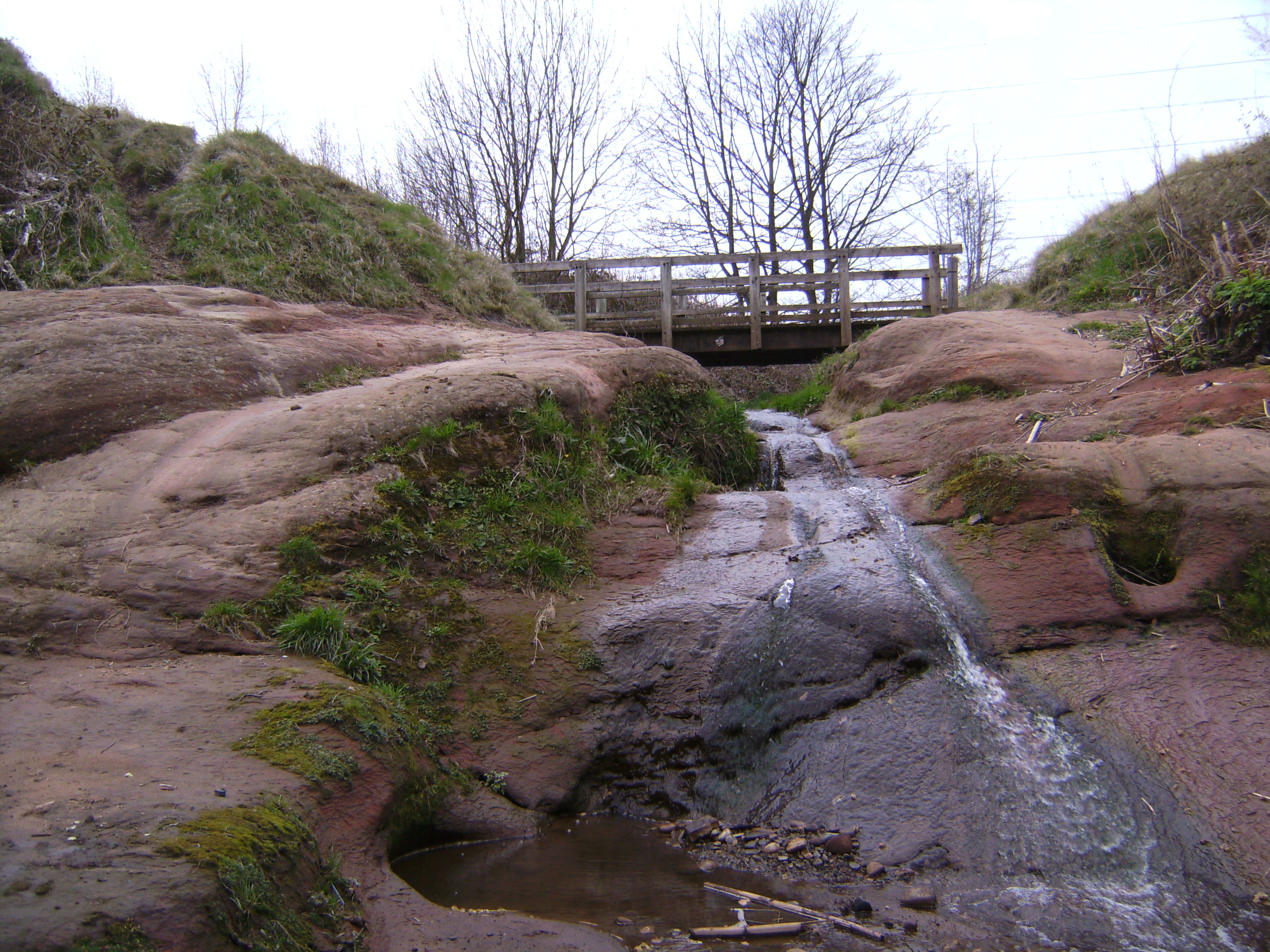
New Red Sandstone at Clifton

From its source until shortly after its confluence with the River Croal, the river runs through a landscape formed from rocks of the late Carboniferous Coal Measures and the underlying (and therefore older) Millstone Grit, consisting mostly of a series of sandstone and shales. The lower sections of the river run through a landscape where the bedrock is of Permian and Triassic age, though alluvial and river terrace deposits often obscure the rock strata. The glaciers of the Pleistocene epoch radically re-shaped the landscape and then retreated, leaving behind deposits of sand, pebbles and boulder clay that formed the fluvioglacial ridges of the lower Irwell Valley. Ashclough, a 5.08-hectare (12.6-acre) site which comprises the steep banks of the river between Prestolee and Little Lever, has been designated an SSSI because of its geological interest, primarily because it is the best site in the area displaying the Ashclough marine band and its associated strata. Ashclough is a site of national importance for interpreting the coal measures palaeogeography of Great Britain.

== River Irwell catchment area ==
The River Irwell catchment area extends from the moors above Bacup to the Manchester Ship Canal. The climate of the catchment area is wetter than the UK average, with rainfall of 1,456 millimetres (57.3 in) per annum compared to 1,231 millimetres (48.5 in) per annum, and the rivers quickly respond to rainfall. The topography varies considerably, with the upper reaches dominated by the Pennine moors at an altitude of between 350 and 450 metres (1,150 and 1,480 ft) AOD and the bottom of the catchment consisting of relatively flat land, which lies between 20 and 150 metres (66 and 492 ft) AOD. The watercourses are characterised by steep narrow valleys, which contributes to high rates of run-off, as does the underlying solid geology. This comprises Lower Coal Measures overlying Millstone Grit, both of which are classified as minor aquifers which will only hold relatively small amounts of water. The surface deposits comprise thick peat in the upper reaches, with glacial boulder clay and glacial sand and gravel in the lower parts. The sand and gravel are also classified as a minor aquifer, whilst the boulder clay is a non-aquifer. The higher, steeper slopes of the upper part of the catchment provide a large source of erodible material and debris which is transported downstream to the lower, flatter parts of the catchment. Where the channel is constricted, this material is then deposited and can contribute to a reduction in channel capacity.

== History ==
=== Etymology ===
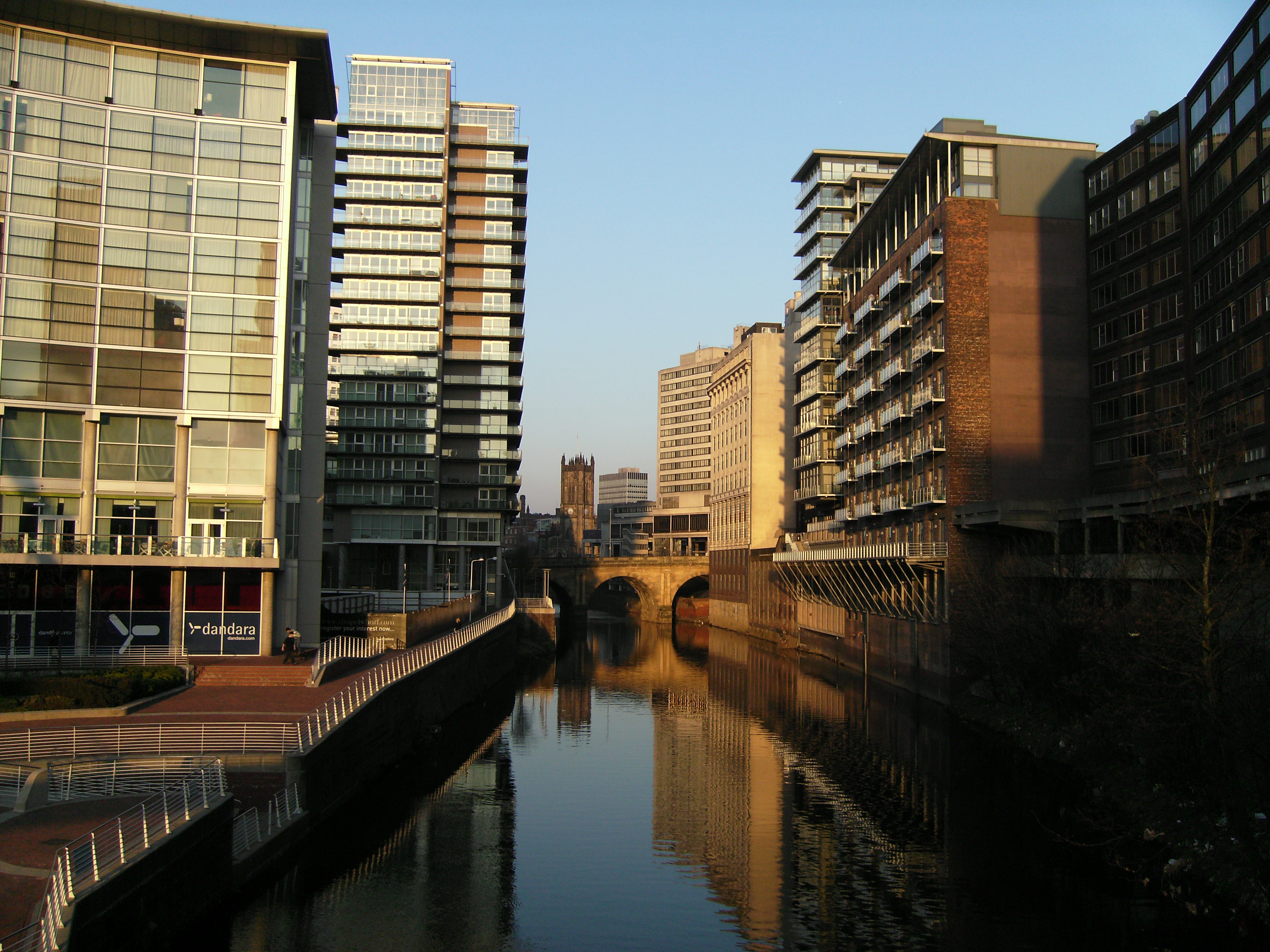
The River Irwell divides the cities of Salford (left) and Manchester.

The origins of the name "Irwell" are uncertain but many accept the Anglo-Saxon origin, ere-well, meaning "hoar or white spring". The first part of the name may also be the Brittonic *ar, an ancient river-name element that implies horizontal motion, "flowing", "rising" or else "springing up".

=== Ancient history ===
Flint scrapers, knives and other materials associated with the Neolithic period were discovered on Kersal Moor in the late 19th century and early 20th century. There have been isolated finds of artefacts characteristic of this period along the Irwell valley, and a possible hunting site was excavated at Prestwich Golf Course in 1982, which produced a quantity of Late Neolithic and Early Bronze Age flints. Neolithic tools have also been found in the River Roch near Bury and in Radcliffe, and Bronze Age burial sites have been found in Bury and Shuttleworth.

=== Celtic, Roman and Medieval ===
The first recorded human settlements were those of the Celtic tribe, the Brigantes, who farmed the uplands and lower reaches of the river in the late Iron Age. In AD 79 the Roman Empire conquered these tribes, building forts at the confluences of the Irwell and the rivers Irk and Medlock and naming the town Mamucium. They also built a ford with rectangular stone blocks at Cornbrook, which is thought to be the first man-made structure to span the river. For four hundred years the Pax Romana brought peace, but their withdrawal in AD 410 left the tribes at the mercy of the Saxons, who renamed the town Manigceastre. The Danes later seized, and all-but destroyed Manigceastre, and absorbed what was left of the tribes. The Danelaw ruled until AD 920 when the Norsemen were expelled by Edward the Elder.

In the Middle Ages the town, which was now known as Manceastre (later to become Manchester), grew and prospered, and trading vessels plied along the river. The hamlet of Kersal, which now forms part of the City of Salford, was gifted to the Cluniac Priory of Lenton, near Nottingham, in 1142. The most important part of the gift was the fishing rights on the River Irwell, and even in the 18th century, the salmon rights on the rivers of Lancashire were let every year for many hundreds of pounds.

=== 19th century ===
During the Industrial Revolution factories, mills and terraced hovels grew up along the river banks. Joseph Corbett, the Borough Engineer of Salford, wrote in his 1907 book The River Irwell of his father Edward's experiences around 1819, of seeing "large shoals of fish, chiefly gudgeon but also other fish, rising to the flies" from a vantage point on New Bailey bridge, (now Albert Bridge) in Manchester. Local industry dumped toxic chemicals into the river, such as gas-tar, gas-lime and ammonia water, and by 1850 fish stocks had all but disappeared. In 1860 the Irwell was described as "almost proverbial for the foulness of its waters; receiving the refuse of cotton factories, coal mines, print works, bleach works, dye works, chemical works, paper works, almost every kind of industry." In 1862 the Scottish geologist Hugh Miller wrote about the Irwell, in his book First Impressions: The English People, describing it as:

The hapless river—a pretty enough stream a few miles higher up, with trees overhanging its banks, and fringes of green sedge set thick along its edges—loses caste as it gets among the mills and the printworks. There are myriads of dirty things given it to wash, and whole waggon-loads of poisons from dye-houses and bleachyards thrown into it to carry away; steam-boilers discharge into it their seething contents, and drains and sewers their fetid impurities; till at length it rolls on—here between tall dingy walls, there under precipices of red sandstone—considerably less a river than a flood of liquid manure, in which all life dies, whether animal or vegetable, and which resembles nothing in nature, except, perhaps, the stream thrown out in eruption by some mud-volcano.

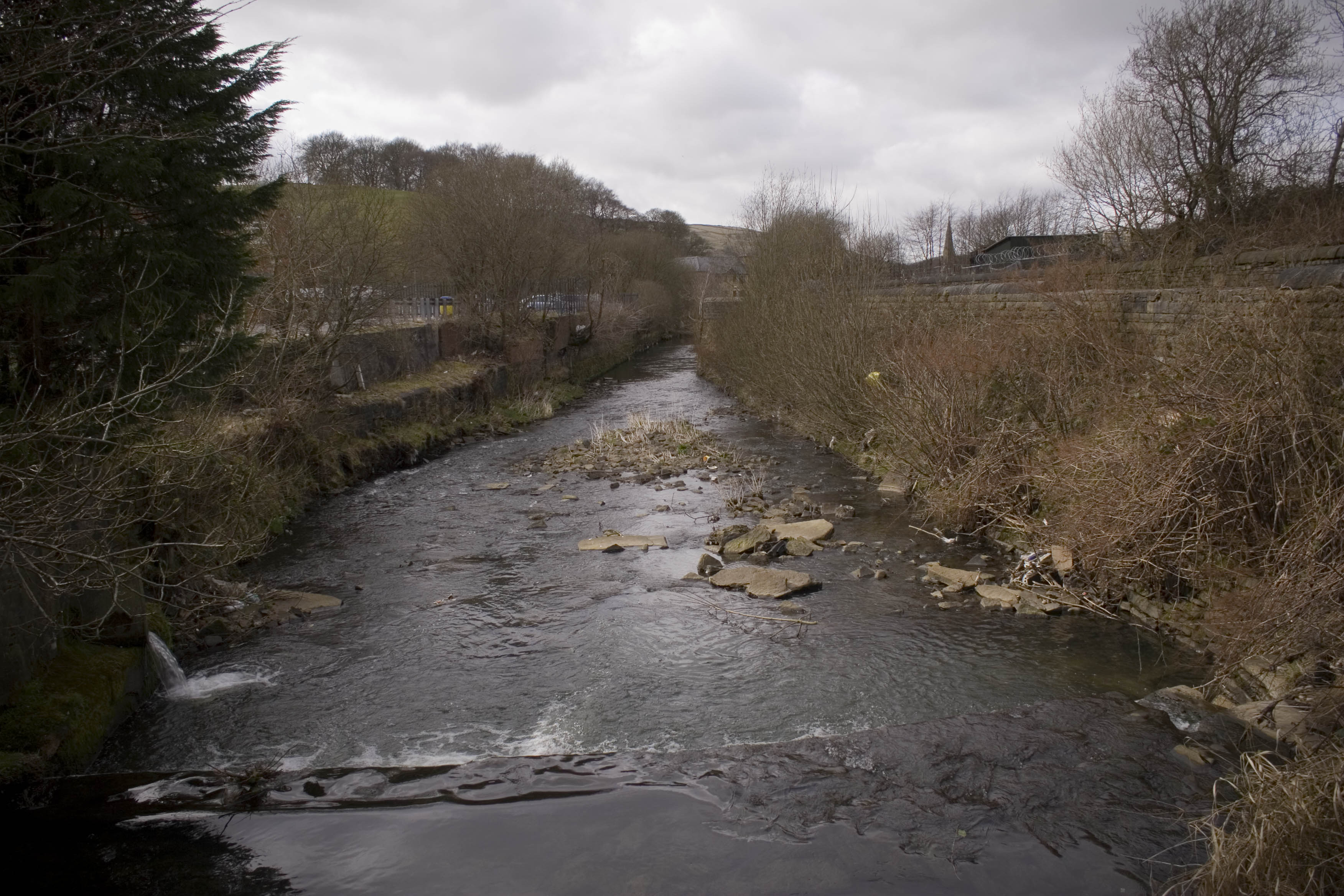
The Irwell flows west through Waterfoot, in Rossendale.

In the Victorian era passenger boat trips were popular but cut-short by the foul smells from the river. In 1862 the Corporation of Salford promoted an act of Parliament, the Salford Improvement Act 1862 (25 & 26 Vict. c. ccv), enabling them to establish a River Conservancy Committee; they appointed a river inspector, and had to power to take action against anyone polluting the river. The Rivers Pollution Prevention Act 1876 (39 & 40 Vict. c. 75) was designed to solve the problems of river pollution, but it was largely ineffective. It did, however, lay the groundwork for the more draconian legislation which followed, and in 1891 the Mersey and Irwell Joint Committee was formed by the Rivers Mersey and Irwell Order 1891, which was confirmed by the Local Government Board's Provisional Orders Confirmation (No. 10) Act 1891 (54 & 55 Vict. c. lxxi). Local authorities were ordered to provide sewage treatment facilities, and industrial concerns were told to use the best practical means of preventing pollution. Salford was one of the first authorities in the Irwell watershed to install intercepting sewers and sewage treatment works at Mode Wheel Sewage works.

In the 1830s, there was an ambitious plan to build a reservoir system on the Irwell, in the vein of Robert Thom's innovations in hydraulics, in order to provide a more regular supply of water power to mills at a lower cost than steam power. The plan was led by Thomas Ashworth (younger brother of Henry Ashworth) and Peter Ewart. The proposal was to build 15 reservoirs that would contain 241.3 million cubic feet of water and generate at least 6,600 horsepower. The Irwell Reservoirs Bill was submitted to Parliament in November 1832, but it was not passed. The reasons are not entirely known, but are seemingly related to concerns from mill owners about unequal benefits obtained from the plan.

One of the most famous characters associated with the river during this time was Mark Addy, who was born in a tenement on The Parsonage near Blackfriars Bridge in Manchester in 1838. Whenever anyone was in difficulty in the river, the cry would go up "Bring Mark Addy!" and he would race to the rescue. He was awarded a number of medals including the gold and silver medals from the Humane Society for the Hundred of Salford, and the Royal Humane Society's bronze medal. In 1878 he became the only civilian ever to be awarded the Albert Medal (first class), His final rescue was on Whit Monday in 1889, when he saved a young boy from a particularly sewage-laden section of the river. After this he became ill, and died of tuberculosis in 1890 aged 51. He had rescued more than 50 people from the river during his lifetime.

=== 20th century ===
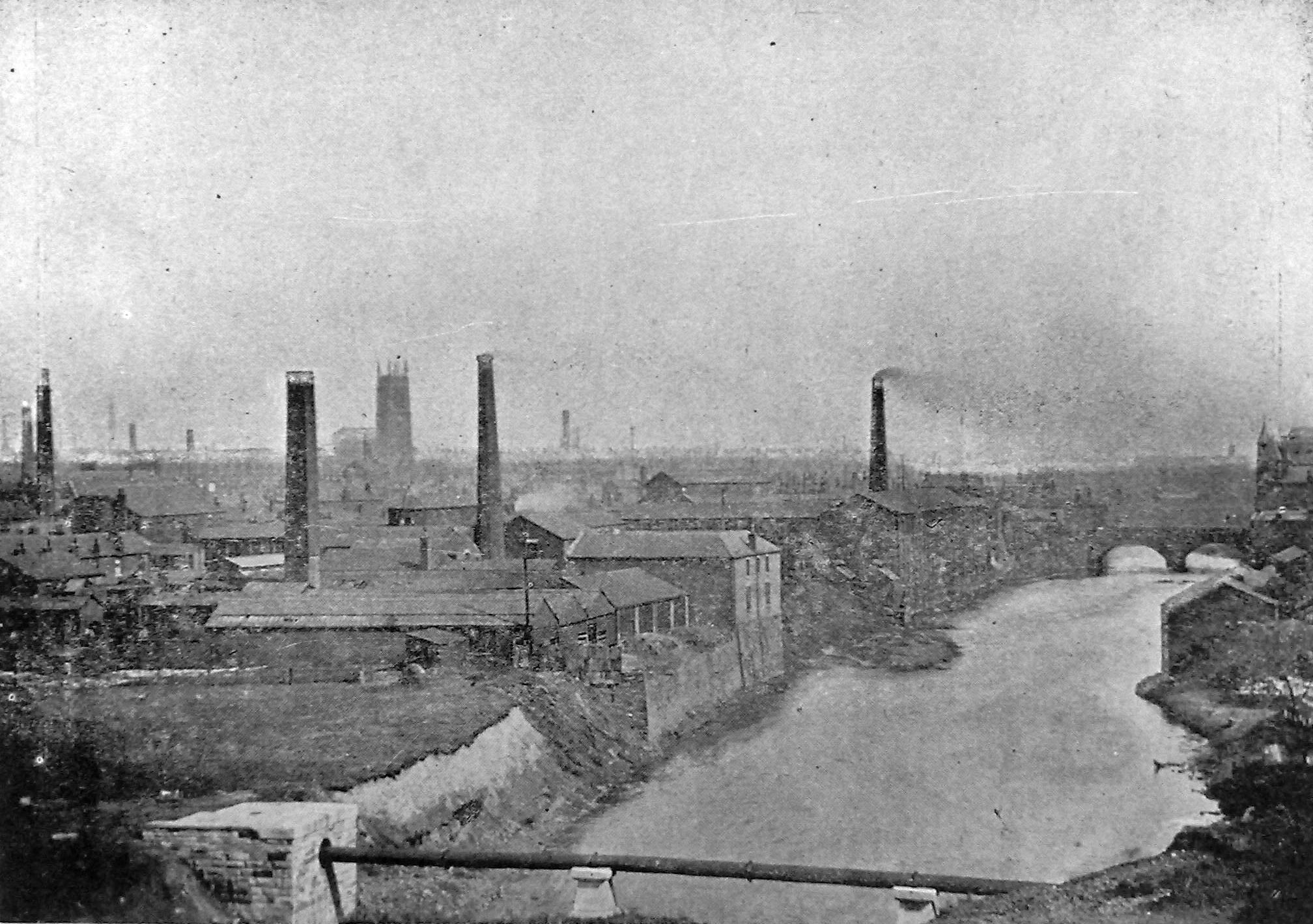
The Industrial Revolution saw the river badly polluted by industry, as pictured in this photograph of Radcliffe taken in 1902.

In 1939, the Mersey and Irwell Joint Committee was superseded by the Lancashire Rivers Board, but wartime conditions brought about further deterioration of the river. The Rivers (Prevention of Pollution) Act 1951 (14 & 15 Geo. 6. c. 64) was passed and this board disappeared to be replaced by the Mersey River Board, which was replaced in turn by the Mersey and Weaver River Authority in 1965. During a 1950s television documentary entitled River of Irwell, the watercourse was described as "The hardest worked river in the world".

In 1946, there was serious flooding in Salford, caused by a bottleneck at a bend in the river at Strangeways, on the border with Manchester. Flooding had been a problem for hundreds of years, and, in 1946, the decision was made to straighten and widen the river to increase its capacity. Work started in 1951 but it was not until September 1970 that water first flowed through the Anaconda Cut. The total cost of the project was £2m.

In a question to the House of Commons in 1950 the Member of Parliament for Rossendale, Mr. Anthony Greenwood, highlighted the lamentable condition of the Irwell and one of its main tributaries, the River Roch:

Today I am afraid that fish in most of those rivers are virtually extinct. Anybody who stands today in the City of Manchester outside the Exchange Station and looks down at the noisome black water which flows beneath him would find it difficult to believe that any fish, or any other living creature, could ever have lived in what the Manchester Guardian has so rightly called that "melancholy stream"... I have had my differences with the British Field Sports Society, but I have nothing but admiration for the excellent series of reports on river pollution which have been prepared for that Society... and ventured to suggest that they should make a similar survey of the Rivers Irwell and Roach. These two rivers were covered by the third report; and very sorry reading it made. There are two passages in that report which I should like to read. The first says: "The banks are lined with factories, large and small, many of which take their water from the drainage of the hills forming the slopes of the river's valley, and discharge it as a polluted effluent, either into the small feeders, or the main river itself, so it may be said that no natural water normally enters the river from its cradle in the moors to its grave in the Manchester Ship Canal." The second quotation is one which I find still more appalling than the first. It is: "There are no fish in these rivers (apart from a very occasional tributary), no insects, no weeds, no life of any kind except sewage fungus, nothing but chemicals and any dirt which cannot be put to profitable use. Sewage effluents (and, being usually very good, they are the most encouraging feature of the appalling situation) are hailed with delight as being the purest water which the rivers hold." The full importance of that statement will be realised when I remind hon. Members of the frequency with which residents in Bacup, Ramsbottom, Manchester and Salford are subjected to flooding from the waters of the Irwell.

In 1951, it was announced that flood defence works were to be carried out on the stretch of the river passing through Lower Broughton between Cromwell Bridge and Gerald Road Bridge, although local property owners and shopkeepers were outraged at being asked to bear part of the cost. Work on the 8-foot-thick (2.4 m) concrete wall did not get underway until June 1952 and was still only nearing completion when, in August 1957, nearby homes were threatened by flooding during heavy rain.

==== 1970s ====
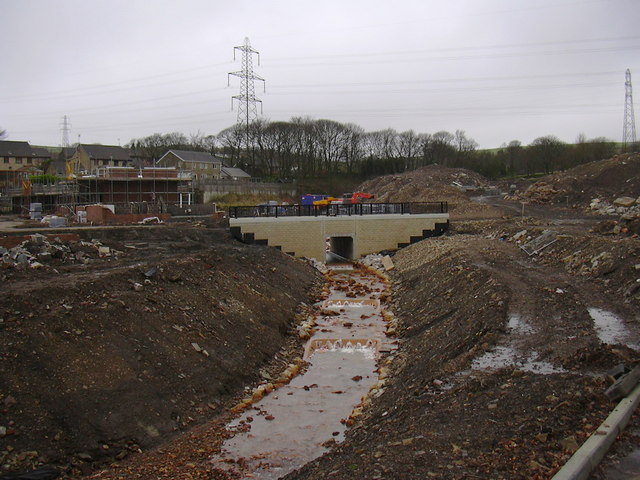
Iron oxide pollution near the river's source

A report in the Manchester Evening News in 1971 stated that Bury Angling Society had signed an agreement with Bury Corporation giving them fishing rights along four miles (six kilometres) of the river between Summerseat and Radcliffe. The secretary of the society was quoted as saying:

Extensive tests have been carried out on fish we put in the river and we are satisfied that the water will support fish life. Roach and perch have already been caught and we have had no reports of any ill-effects. There is no doubt the pollution is clearing. It will be a long job, but we are sure there is a future for angling in the river.

The report went on to state that the society "intends to carry out stocking operations soon". In 1972 the newspaper reported that "tiddlers" (small fish) had been seen swimming in the "notorious inky Irwell" near Peel Park, Salford. The deputy chief water quality officer for Salford, Mr. Eric Harper, said:

Ten years ago, any fish getting as far down as Salford would have been killed almost immediately by the pollution in the water. Although the river there is now a great deal better than it has been for 100 years, fish will probably not be able to live long. These had probably got into the main river from small streams flowing into the Irwell. But I think it is real progress.

Mr Harper went on to say that the Irwell had been well stocked with fish along its whole length 100 years ago but refused to guess when it would reach the same state again. In 1974 all of the river authorities were merged into the regional water authorities. In the 1974 annual report of the North West Water Authority (NWWA), it was said that the river "once internationally famous, or infamous as the epitome of river pollution, is now in a much better state as compared with its condition at the time of a special survey carried out nine years ago." This was reported in an article in the Manchester Evening News on 26 October of that year which stated that:

During nine years of pollution control work reviewed by the North West Water Authority, the biggest improvement had been in the Bolton District, where effluent from five dilapidated sewage plants and two paper mills were now being treated at the Ringley Fold Works [but] there has been little reduction in pollution from the river Roch. At Bacup the headwater of the Irwell is discoloured by ochre deposits from a disused mine but work is being done to stop the ochre seepage. Fish do exist in the stretch between Rossendale and Bury and fish are to be introduced in stretches between Radcliffe and Manchester. However, it is feared that it will be many years before fish will be able to breed freely in the river.

==== 1980s ====
In 1980, a scheme for improving a section of the river between Littleton Road and Adelphi Weir in Salford for boating purposes was included in Greater Manchester Policy Committee's capital programme for 1981/82. County Councillors at a recent committee meeting had criticised the condition of the river, with the councillor for the Metropolitan Borough of Oldham calling it "quite revolting and horrible". A spokesperson for the NWWA said that, although the river had a reputation for being polluted, it was getting much better but still had not reached a state where they would be satisfied. She added that tests were being carried out to show the improved cleanliness of the Irwell and that 600 trout had recently been put in the river at Summerseat, near Bury. The proposals were welcomed by both Salford University and Agecroft Rowing Club, with the university stating that they wished to use that section for their boat race. Later that year it was reported that hundreds of trees and shrubs were to be planted along the banks of the Irwell between Broughton and Pomona Dock in a £650,000 "green finger" scheme to "bring the countryside into the heart of industrial Salford". The dossier outlining the scheme, prepared by Salford's Technical Services Officer, emphasised the "bleak character" of the Irwell Valley with "many constructions by the river that are decaying and rotting" and said "the main problems are caused by an excess of ammonia and a high organic content from sewage effluents which discharge into the water upstream." The report recommended that "even more support should be given to the NWWA in their pollution control of the River Irwell."

Throughout the 1980s, sightings of fish as far downstream as Manchester city centre were reported in local newspapers. In February 1981 the Manchester Evening News reported that "ten jacksharps [sticklebacks], about two inches long" had been spotted by a site manager working on the Mark Addy public house, which was then being built on the disused New Bailey Landing Stage, below New Bailey Street, on the border of Manchester and Salford. Plans for developing the river for recreational use were also coming to fruition as it was reported in 1982 that, over the May bank holiday, the first pleasure cruise on the river in the 20th century would leave from the Mark Addy as part of a three-day experiment to see whether river cruises could be a success. In 1983 over 100 canal and river boats rode the flooded river for the Greater Manchester Waterways Festival, an event aimed at demonstrating how pleasure boating could "transform the bleak waterway in the heart of Manchester". By 1984 two local men felt the waters were clean enough for them to brave a ten-mile (16 km) charity fund-raising swim from Clifton to Manchester, although they were warned by a spokesman for the North West Water Authority that the cocktail of effluent and occasional untreated sewage meant that the Irwell was still "a class 4 river – top of the pollution chart". During 1985 the Croal–Irwell Valley local plan was launched, listing 187 proposals for the improvement of the valley and in 1986 the Mersey Basin Campaign was announced. The campaign was to cover a large area, from Rossendale in the north to Crewe in the south, and it was promised that £67m would be made available in the first three years for water- and land-based projects. In September 1987 plans were revealed for a mile-long landscaped walkway in Manchester city centre and developers announced plans to develop three bricked-up railway arches on the side of the river, opposite Manchester Cathedral, into a wine bar and restaurant. In 1988 Manchester's first water bus made its maiden voyage from the New Bailey Landing Stage, then known as the Mark Addy Quay, on a five-mile (8 km) inaugural round trip to Salford Quays By the end of the 1980s ambitious plans had been announced to turn Manchester into a top international tourist centre "mainly based on the derelict areas around the waterways of Manchester, Salford and Trafford – the Irwell, the Irk, the ship canal and the Bridgewater Canal...bringing £500m of investment and 13,000 new jobs over the next 10 years". The Manchester Ship Canal Company also announced a £70 million redevelopment scheme for Pomona Docks in Salford, to include a marina, homes, offices and other commercial developments.

==== 1990s ====
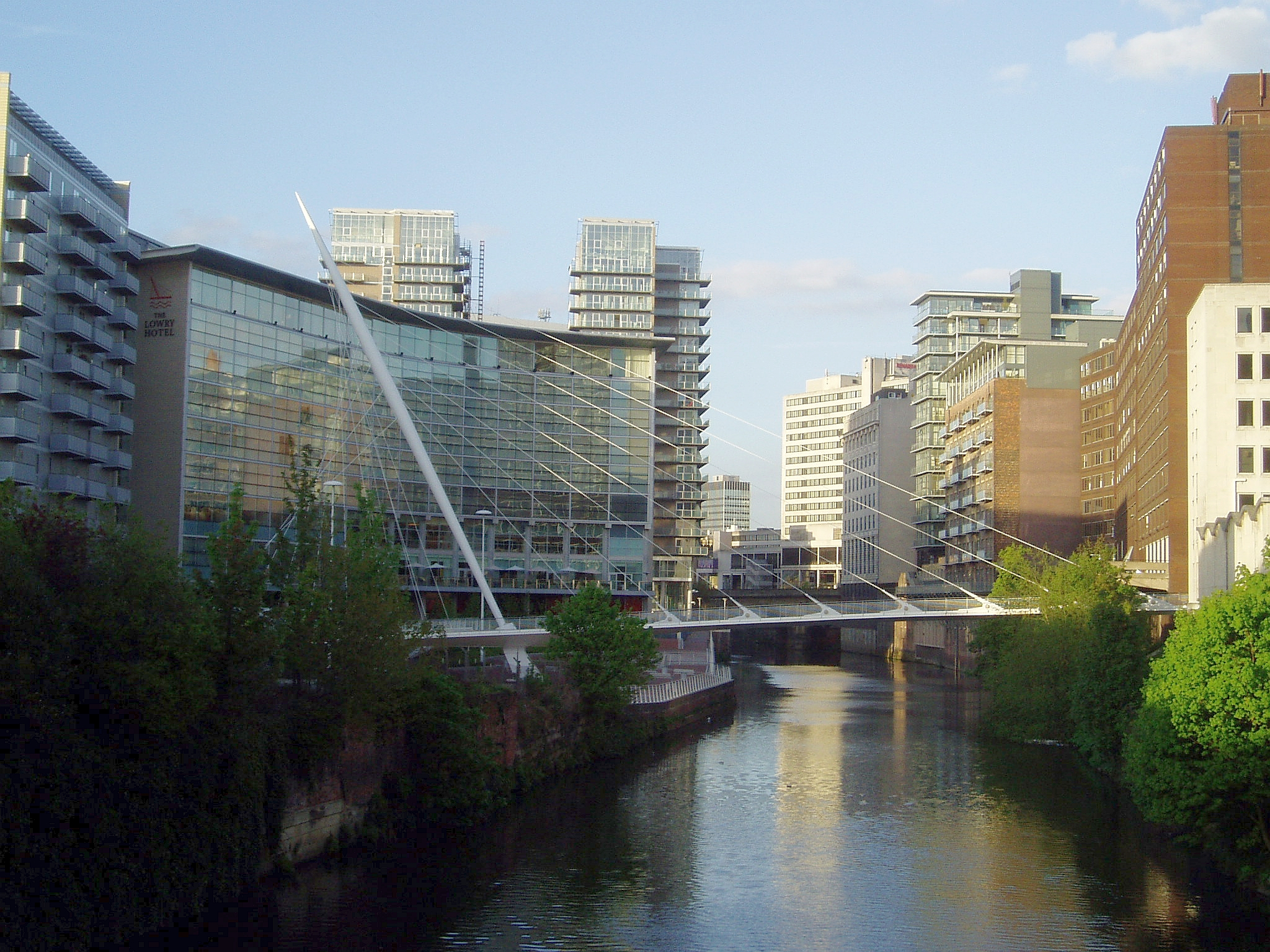
Trinity Bridge

In 1990, the newly formed Mersey and Irwell Packet Company launched regular tourist trips along the river from a landing stage opposite the Granada Studios Tour entrance in Quay Street, taking in the stretch from Castlefield to Salford Quays. This was not universally welcomed as, by September of that year, a retired chemical engineer claimed that the pleasure boat was "leaving clouds of methane in its wake as it disturbed sediment on the river bed". However, in 1991 a feature article appeared in the magazine Lancashire Life extolling the virtues of the cruise, and stating that the Irwell "once thought a liability is in fact a major asset to urban regeneration ... now the twin cities compete to befriend her, to dress her in finery and proudly introduce her back into society. And the public are cordially invited back onto her waters." During 1994, construction work began on a new £1.3M footbridge to link Manchester and Salford, to be known as Trinity Bridge. The box-girder and steel cable construction was designed by Spanish architect Santiago Calatrava to represent a ship in full sail as the centrepiece of the £50M Chapel Wharf Regeneration Scheme, which was expected to breathe new life into a run-down area of Salford and to create up to 8,000 new jobs. In May 1995 a new 30-mile (48 km) long multimillion-pound arts trail, to be known as the Irwell Sculpture Trail, was reported in the Manchester Evening News and in June 1997 work began on the £10 million Lower Irwell Valley Flood Defence Scheme in Lower Kersal.

=== 21st century ===
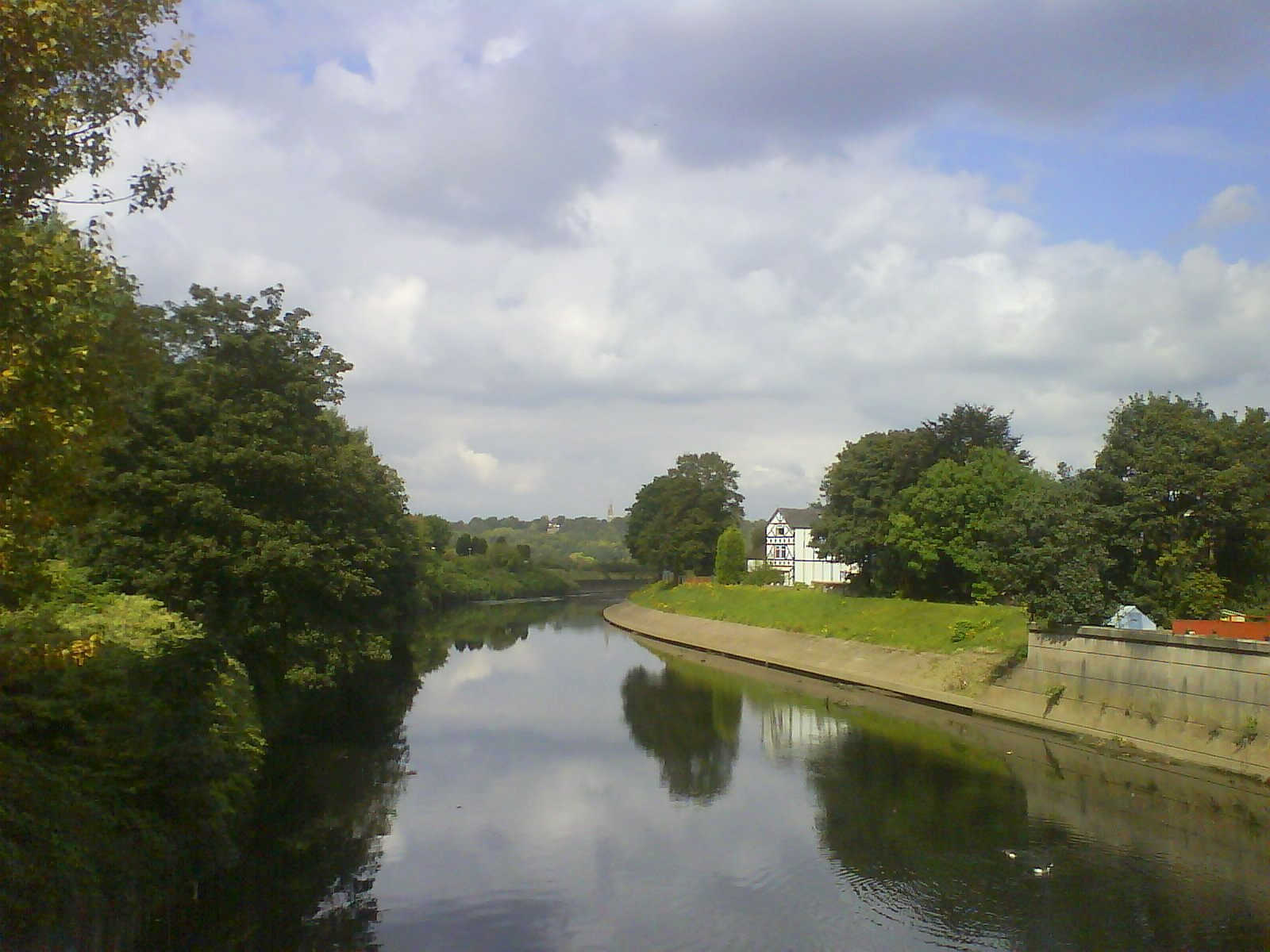
The Irwell at Cromwell Bridge, Broughton

In July 2000 there was a setback for the clean-up programme when a pollution incident affected approximately 2 1/2 miles (4 kilometres) of the river between Rawtenstall and Ramsbottom, causing the death of more than 36,000 fish. The large number of fish killed did however serve to illustrate how much the river had improved from the lifeless, "melancholy stream" of the 1950s. In 2005 a £1M project to make the river "the cleanest it has been for decades" was announced by United Utilities. The improvements included fitting filters on sewers in Lower Broughton to ensure litter was not washed into the river, as part of a scheme to improve overflows across Adlington, Wigan, Chorley, Rochdale and Bury. Then in October 2008 United Utilities announced that work on the Ringley Fold Wastewater Works in Stoneclough, to be completed by the end of the year, should increase the number of fish in the river and "massively improve the environment locally so walkers, canoeists and anglers will all reap the benefits." The company said that this was to be the biggest scheme that they had undertaken in the region, and the project manager was quoted as saying:

Reducing the amount of phosphate in the water is the main driver behind the scheme. New legislation states that the amount of phosphate in waste water should be one milligram per litre because it causes water to clog with algae and reduces the amount of oxygen in the water, which results in less aquatic life and fish.

The treatment plant, which was built in the 1930s and last updated in the 1970s, treats waste water from a population of half a million, from Bolton, Prestwich, Whitefield and Clifton.

There was another pollution incident in March 2008 when twenty miles of the river turned orange. Iron oxide from old mine workings near the source at Irwell Springs had polluted the water since 1969 and in 1997 a Coal Authority survey identified the stretch as having the fourth worst case of minewater pollution in the country. A treatment plant was built in 1999 to remove the pollution at a cost of £1M; however, it is thought that there was a collapse in the mine after heavy rains in the spring of 2008. Although the water was stained with ochre, no damage to wildlife was reported.

== Commerce ==
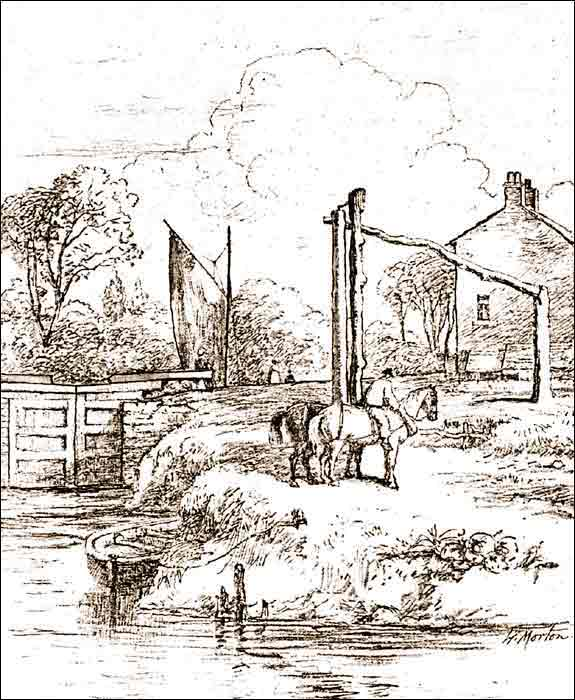
Stickings Lock on the Mersey and Irwell Navigation, c. 1850

=== Mersey and Irwell Navigation ===
In the late 17th century, the Warrington businessman Thomas Patten had made the River Mersey navigable as far as Warrington and suggested that there would be significant commercial value in extending this along the Irwell as far as Manchester. In 1721, Parliament authorised the alteration with the Rivers Mercy and Irwell Navigation Act 1720 (7 Geo. 1. St. 1 c. 15), and by 1736 work had been completed by creating eight canal locks along the 20-mile (32-kilometre) route from Warrington to Manchester, allowing access to boats of up to 51 tonnes. The waterway, which became known as the Mersey and Irwell Navigation, played a central role in the cotton industry of the 18th century that spearheaded the Industrial Revolution.

=== Bridgewater Canal ===
When Francis Egerton, 3rd Duke of Bridgewater built the Bridgewater Canal, the task of crossing the Irwell was one of the main obstacles he faced. The solution was to build a canal-carrying bridge across the river, the first barge aqueduct in England. The aqueduct, which opened in 1761, measured 12 metres (39 ft) high and 200 metres (656 ft) long, and became one of the wonders of the age. The Mersey and Irwell Navigation and the Bridgewater Canal competed for trade to and from Manchester for the next 120 years and specially designed barges with a shallow draft, known as "Mersey flats", were used on both waterways. Over the years both trade and rivalry continued to grow with each company offering reduced freight charges or special rates and concessions to gain business from the other. The most important cargo carried was raw cotton from Liverpool to Manchester but timber, dyewoods, pig iron, lead, copper, nails, tar, sand, grain and flour were also carried. Passenger services had been operating on the Bridgewater Canal for some years and in 1807 the Irwell and Mersey Navigation Company began to compete with daily services between Runcorn and Manchester. In 1816 they began to use packet steamers. However, in 1830 the Liverpool and Manchester Railway opened; packet boat services went into decline, and ceased to operate completely in the 1860s. In Manchester two other canals used the Irwell as a point of access: the Manchester, Bolton and Bury Canal from 1809, and the Manchester and Salford Junction Canal from 1839. The previous year, the short Hulme Locks Branch Canal had also connected the Irwell to the Bridgewater Canal at Castlefield. All are now non-navigable, although the first is under restoration.

=== Manchester Ship Canal ===
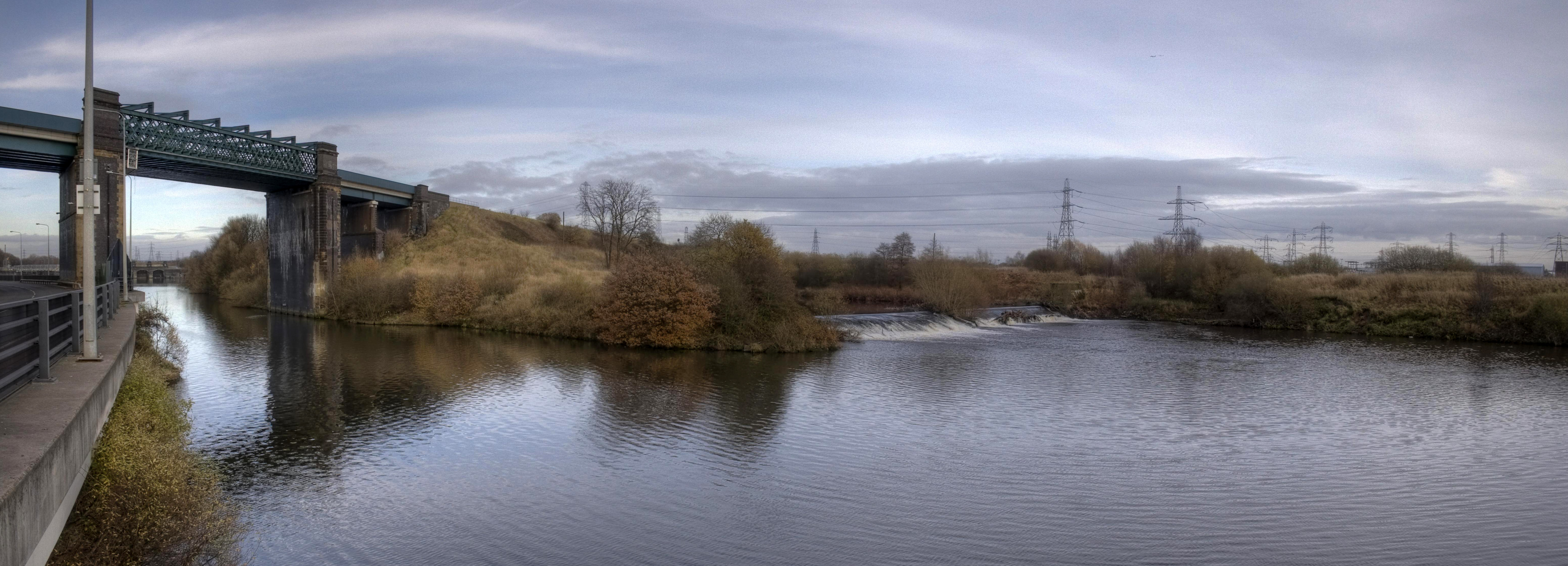
The River Mersey empties into the Manchester Ship Canal near Irlam Locks.

As the 19th century progressed, the increasing need for large freight carriers led to Liverpool's dominance as a port. Manchester became increasingly reliant on its Merseyside neighbour for its imports and exports, but the handling charges and dues charged by the Mersey Docks and Harbour Board made goods from Manchester uncompetitive. A solution was to build the Manchester Ship Canal. In 1887 the Bridgewater Navigation Company was purchased by the Manchester Ship Canal Company with a cheque for £1,710,000, which was at the time the largest cheque ever written, and the building of the Manchester Ship Canal began. The canal, which was made by greatly deepening and widening the eastern section of the Mersey and Irwell Navigation, opened on 1 January 1894. It reduced the shipping costs of raw cotton to the mills and the dispatching the finished cloth overseas. The canal had helped the region to become the centre of the Industrial Revolution, and it had transformed Manchester into England's third largest port, despite being 40 miles (65 kilometres) inland. As the canal was built, it became clear that Brindley's famous aqueduct would have to be demolished, as it allowed insufficient headroom for the freighters that the canal would carry. Fortunately, in 1896 the councillors of Eccles paid to have the aqueduct moved to the spot it occupies today, alongside the canal. The Bridgewater Canal is now carried over the Manchester Ship Canal by the equally celebrated Barton Swing Aqueduct, which was completed in 1893 with the novel idea of "opening" by rotating 90 degrees to allow ships to pass.

The construction of the Manchester Ship Canal and the Manchester Docks led to the development of Trafford Park as the largest industrial estate in Europe, and brought employment to the area for the next eighty years. By the 1960s however, the UK had begun to lose its position as an industrial world power. By the mid-20th century, the UK cotton industry had gone into decline because of low-cost competition from Asian manufacturers. The decline of heavy industry in the area, the increasing size of freight-carrying ships, and competition from road transport, brought about the decline of the terminal docks at Salford, which closed in 1982.

== River Irwell flood defence scheme ==
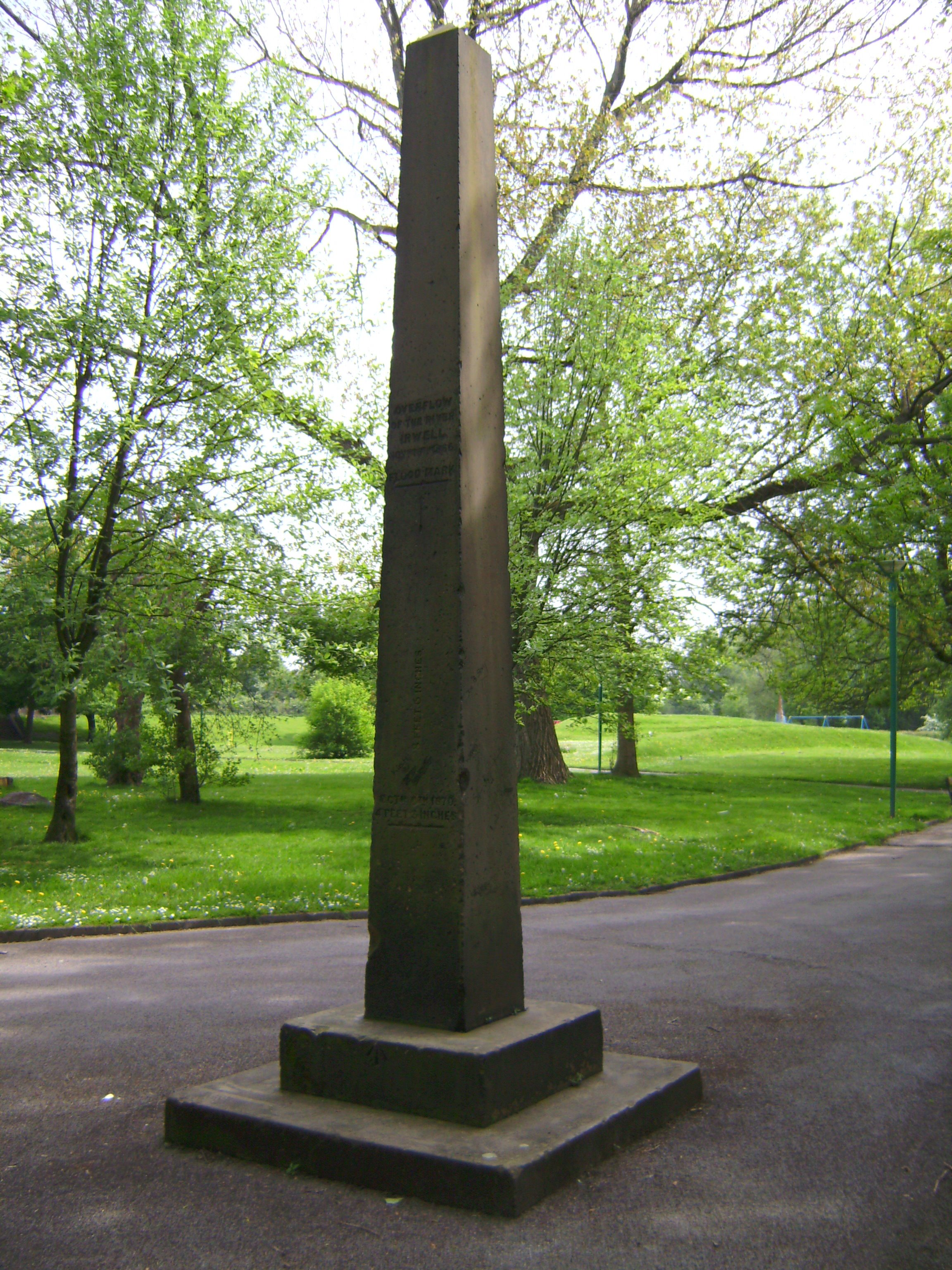
Peel Park flood obelisk showing the 1866 flood level. A second flood line was added after the 1870 floods.

The lower reaches of the Irwell have flooded many times in its history, the most well documented being the floods of 1866, 1946, 1954, 1980, 2007, 2015 and 2020. In December 1816 rapidly thawing snow caused the river to flood, sweeping away a considerable amount of property including building materials and livestock. Locals reported the height of the river to have been almost as great as a more serious flood of 1768. A local public house, the Black Boy, suffered extensive damage as the water caused the rear wall to collapse, a local brewery was flooded with the loss of all its stock, and a Mersey Flat came free of its moorings, hitting Regent Bridge. In 1866, the "year of the great Flood", rain fell for three continuous days commencing on Tuesday 13 November. By the end of the first day, the river had risen 14 feet (4.3 metres) above normal at Peel Park, street lamps could not be lit and mills were brought to a stop. In all, £1 million of property was damaged, 450 hectares of land was flooded, 700 people had to be rescued from wrecked homes, but only one man died by drowning. The height of the flood was marked by an obelisk erected in Peel Park. The construction of the ship canal is said to have reduced the risk of flooding, by providing a larger outlet below Regent bridge. In 1946 in Salford 5,300 properties were flooded, and 600 were flooded in 1954.

To alleviate such problems two flood storage basins with a capacity of 650,000 cubic metres (850,000 cu yd) have been constructed to the west of Littleton Road, Kersal, at a cost of around £11 million. As part of the River Irwell Flood Defence Scheme, the defences help to protect some 3,000 properties in Kersal and Lower Broughton against a 1 in 75 year flood. Concerns have been raised that a 1 in a 100-year flood would breach these defences and cause some £55 million damage to property. The defences proved successful on 22 January 2008, when the worst flooding to hit the region in thirty years caused the Irwell to burst its banks further downstream in the centre of Manchester.

On 2 February 2018 the Environment Agency announced the completion of A£10 million extension to the flood defence scheme which will protect almost 2,000 homes and businesses and has created more than 5 hectares of high quality urban wetland habitat. The new development also provides a new footpath around the site which links to existing footpaths to provide a green route to and from the centre of Manchester. The 28 hectare flood basin will protect surrounding properties by holding up to 650 million litres of water during flood conditions. The scheme, utilises an 'offline' storage basin, created in a meander of the Irwell on the site of the old Manchester Racecourse, that will work in tandem with the existing flood storage area at Littleton Road. The embankment around the basin features an inlet to allow the controlled spill of water into the basin when river levels are high. Water will then be stored in the basin during a flood and released back into the river once the water level has dropped. The flood embankments have also been planted with 10 hectares of wildflower habitat, to attract pollinating species such as moths, butterflies and bees.

== Regeneration ==
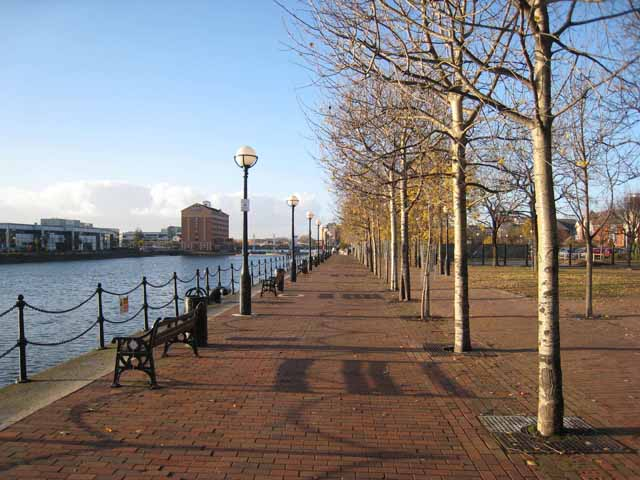
Ontario Basin, Salford Quays

A large urban regeneration project, The Salford Quays Development Plan, was published in 1985 and work began a few years later to redevelop the site for residential, business and leisure purposes. The Salford Quays waterside development has made living by the Irwell, and the Manchester Ship Canal into which it flows, fashionable once again.

There are further plans to "turn the tide on the years of neglect and once again embrace the River Irwell as a fundamental part of Manchester and Salford's heritage and future economic and social growth. The vision is to reinvent the central Manchester conurbation as the major waterfront destination in Northern England." A number of key stakeholders are involved in the development of this regeneration vision. These include Manchester, Salford and Trafford councils, Manchester Ship Canal Company, Environment Agency, Mersey Basin Campaign, local businesses, landowners, community groups and the wider Manchester, Salford and Trafford communities.

=== Irwell City Park ===
In 2007 Manchester City Council, Salford City Council and Trafford Metropolitan Borough Council prepared planning guidance to support the delivery of a project for the restoration of the river and creation of a new urban park, to be called Irwell City Park. The intention is to develop eight kilometres (five miles) of riverside between The Meadows and Peel Park in the north, through Salford and Manchester city centres, Ordsall and Pomona Dock areas, around to Salford Quays and Trafford Wharfside. The three authorities formally adopted the draft Planning Guidance in March 2008. The Guidance sets out the guidelines that the councils will use as a material consideration in determining applications for planning permission and other matters in the Irwell City Park area. It also establishes a set of principles to ensure the provision of a continuous riverside cycle/walkway, and the high quality design of new public open spaces and other infrastructure. An application is to be made to the North West Development Agency in October 2008 to support pre-project implementation work, including design and technical feasibility work.

== Sport on the Irwell ==
Rowing has existed along the river in Manchester and Salford since 1823. A regatta was inaugurated on 12 September 1842 on a straight course from Throstle's Nest Weir to Regent Road Bridge. Racing continued in Manchester with events such as Agecroft Regatta and Warburton Regatta. At the turn of the 20th century, rowing was very popular in the area with many local clubs such as Nemesis, Prince of Wales, Minerva, Didsbury and Agecroft all competing regularly. With the decline in the condition of the water, by the Second World War only Agecroft and Broughton rowing clubs were still active.

Agecroft Rowing Club was formed in 1861, making it one of the oldest open membership rowing clubs in the world. The club was originally based in the grounds of Agecroft Hall and then a short distance downstream at Littleton Road. However, the river became impossible for eight's and fours to pass due to the encroachment of weeds and river life following the clean up of the environment. The club now operates from a boat house next to the Salford Watersports Centre at Salford Quays, which it has shared with the University of Salford Boat Club since 2004. The boat house, which the sport's governing body, British Rowing, has nominated as the North West Centre of Excellence, also hosts the Two Cities Boat Race, which has been held on the river since 1972.

This river is home to the Salford Friendly Anglers' Society, the oldest angling society in the world, founded in 1817.

== Tributaries ==
Tributaries of the Irwell

Moving upstream from the Mersey confluence, the tributaries include the following:

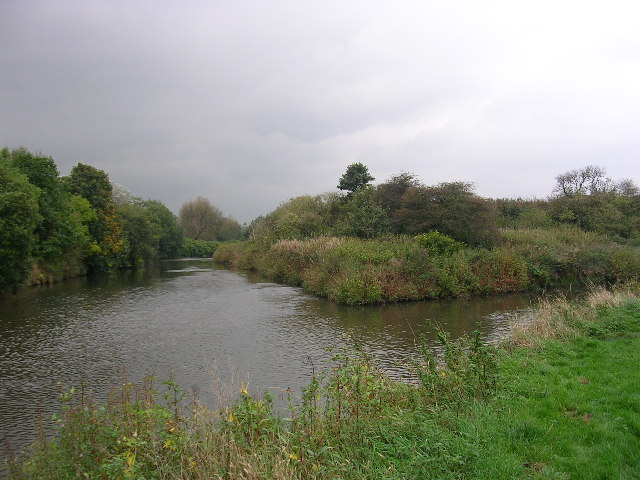
Confluence of the Roch and Irwell at Bury

- Platts Brook
- Bent Lanes Brook
  - Longford Brook
- Salteye Brook
  - Worsley Brook
    - Folly Brook
- Gilda Brook
- Corn Brook
  - Rush Brook
  - Black Brook
  - Clayton Brook
- River Medlock
- River Irk
  - Boggart Hole Brook
  - Moston Brook
- Singleton Brook
- Slack Brook
- Bradley Brook
- Unity Brook
- Horridge Brook
- River Croal
  - River Tonge
- Hutchinson's Goit
- Bealey's Goit
- River Roch
  - River Spodden
  - River Beal
- Elton Brook
- Woodhill Brook
  - Kirklees Brook
    - Black Brook
- Seedfield Brook
- Pigs Lee Brook
  - Whitewall Brook
    - Gindles Brook
- Walmersley Brook
- Holcombe Brook
  - Red Brook
- Sunny Brook
- Park Brook
- Cross Bank Brook
  - Shuttleworth Brook
  - Harden Brook
- Dearden Brook
  - Brook Bottom Brook
    - New Gate Brook
  - Scout Moor Brook
- Chatterton Hey Brook
- Great Hey Brook
- Hodge Brook
- Kenyon Brook
- River Ogden
- Balladen Brook
- Langwood Brook
- Limy Water
  - Gin Brook
- Whitewell Brook
  - Shaw Clough Brook
  - Heb Brook
  - Cunliffe Brook
  - Shepherd/Dean Brook
    - Nabb Brook
  - Clough Bottom Brook
  - Deerplay Hill Syke
- Cowpe Brook
- Sow Brook
- Greens Brook
- Britannia Brook
  - Venomous Brook
- Greave Brook
  - Oaken Brook
    - Reaps Brook
- Whittaker Brook
  - Setting Barn Brook
- Scar End Brook
  - Heald Brook

== See also ==
- Canals of the United Kingdom
- History of the British canal system
- Death of Shukri Abdi
