= International Financial Services District =

Financial district in Glasgow, Scotland

- Sgìre Seirbheisean Ionmhais Eadar-nàiseanta (Scottish Gaelic)
- Logo

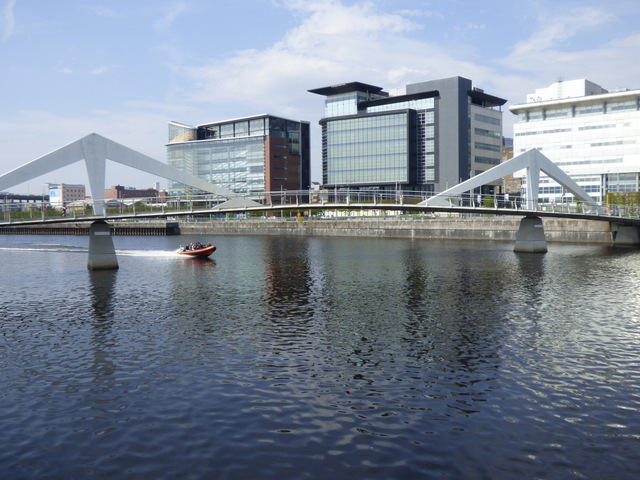
- Part of the IFSD, with the Tradeston Bridge in the foreground, May 2016
- Interactive map of the International Financial Services District area

General information
- Status: Completed
- Type: Financial, government agency, national government, insurance, corporation headquarters
- Location: Broomielaw, Glasgow, Scotland
- Coordinates: 55.85677°N 4.26241°W
- Current tenants: See Buildings & Notable Residents
- Construction started: 2001
- Opened: 2003
- Cost: £1 billion
- Owner: Scottish Enterprise, Glasgow City Council
- Operator: Scottish Government, Scottish Development International, Skills Development Scotland, Glasgow Chamber of Commerce

Technical details
- Grounds: 3 million sq ft (across multiple buildings)

Website
- International Financial Services District

The International Financial Services District (IFSD) (Scottish Gaelic: Sgìre Seirbheisean Ionmhais Eadar-nàiseanta) is a financial district in the city of Glasgow, the largest city in Scotland. Nicknamed "Wall Street on the Clyde", it ranked in the top 40 of international financial districts, ahead of such cities as Brussels, Madrid, Helsinki, Milan and Dublin.

The district began being marketed and developed in succession to the Broomielaw Project pioneered by the Scottish Development Agency in the late 1980s. A public-private financial district in Glasgow, Scotland; attracting inward investment for leading international financial services companies and a re-location option for existing Glasgow-based companies, seeking to expand their operations. Today, it is a major hub in Glasgow for international business, as well as a major contributor to the Economy of Scotland. Notable tenants include Morgan Stanley, JPMorgan Chase and Barclays.

The district comprises over three million square feet (280,000 square metres) of office space, which has been developed since the start of the project in 2001. The separate marketing of the area has ended in 2023, and city promotion is part of InvestGlasgow, headquartered in Glasgow City Council.

== History ==
The long-term decline of the old harbour area of Glasgow and streets off Broomielaw left largely-vacated premises and former bonded warehouses now loosely connected to Glasgow's traditional core business district centred on Blythswood Hill at the western end of the city centre.

Planning led by Scottish Enterprise, as successors to the Scottish Development Agency, and Glasgow City Council has helped create space for 28,000 employees, this measure being recognised as vital to the city's economic fortunes. In order to develop a fully serviced financial services district and its long term potential, significant investment was granted in order to create the "right environment".

When first opened in 2001, the International Financial Services District covered roughly one square kilometre between St Vincent Street and the River Clyde in Glasgow. It is credited as becoming "the catalyst for rengerating the Broomielaw and the west city centre area". Following a period of substantial and successful growth since opening, the International Financial Services District has expanded to the north, east and west in order to meet demand for office space within the district. Its growth has saw the city centre of Glasgow as well as the district itself become the "brand for Glasgow's financial services community".

A further expansion in excess of three million square feet (280,000 square metres) of development has been developed at the International Financial Services District site since it initially opened in 2001.

== Financial and economic role ==
Acknowledge by the Experian annual retail vitality index, Glasgow is the Best UK retail centre outside of London. The district has an "assisted area" status, whereby it is eligible for the Regional Selective Assistance grant in order to enhance investment in capital or in job creation. The International Financial Services District is a major employment location for some of the cities 30,000 employees within the financial sector.

Since its beginnings in 2001, the International Financial Services District has grown to become a major contributor to the Economy of Scotland, and by 2023, additional buildings, such as 1 Atlantic Square and Buchanan Wharf have been completed. Major international companies with either headquarters or offices within the International Financial Services District include Aon, Arthur J Gallagher, Ashurst and New Galexy, AXA Business Insurance, Bank of Scotland, Lloyds Banking Group, Barclays Bank, BNP Paribas, Morgan Stanley, JP Morgan, British Telecom, Clydesdale Bank, Eaton Corporation, First Data Corporation, HML, HSBC, Hymans Robertson, NFU Mutual, the Royal Bank of Scotland, Santander, the Student Loans Company and Tesco Bank.

== Definition ==
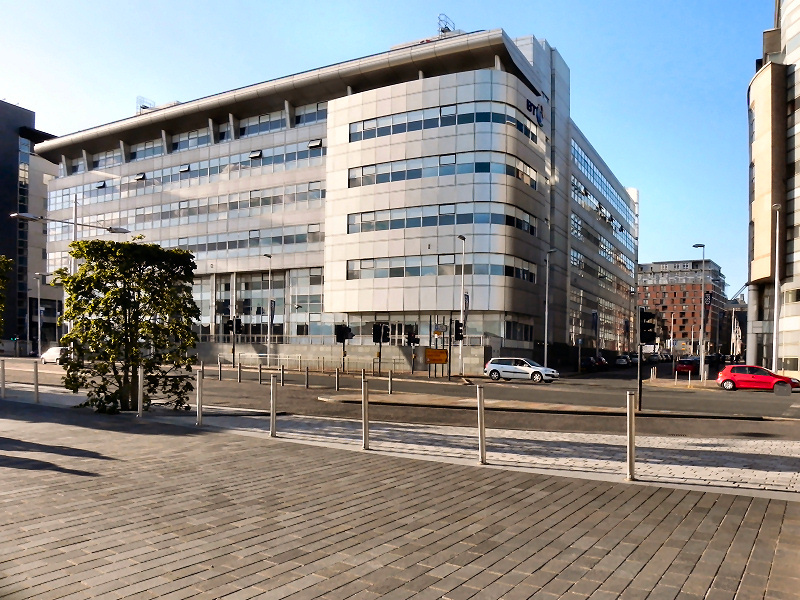
BT building at the IFSD

No official boundary of the IFSD exists; originally it referred to the approximately 1 square kilometre area of the city centre bounded by the M8 motorway to the west, the River Clyde the south, Hope Street to the east, and Bothwell Street to the north - also parts of Blythswood Hill, and the south eastern fringe of Anderston. This has given rise to the area's nicknames in the popular press: the Square Kilometre (in reference to the "square mile" of the City of London), and more the popular and widely used Wall Street On Clyde.

As originally anticipated, the district extended onto the south bank of the Clyde following the regeneration of Bridge Wharf and construction of the Buchanan Wharf complex in Tradeston.

== Transport ==
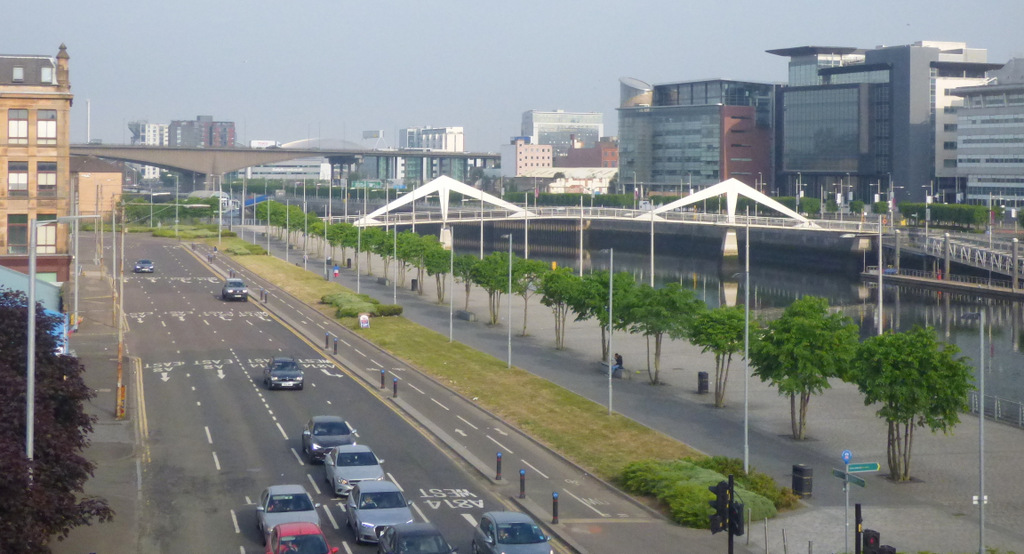
The IFSD (right) with the Tradeston Bridge crossing the River Clyde

=== Railway ===
The IFSD is connected by five railway stations, with routes that reach regionally and nationally.

- Anderston station
- Charing Cross station
- Glasgow Central station
- Glasgow Queen Street station
- Exhibition Centre station

=== Subway Rail ===
The IFSD is connected with two Glasgow Subway stations. The Glasgow Subway the world's third oldest underground metro railway in the world. The two stations that cover the IFSD are:

- Buchanan Street Subway
- St Enoch Subway

=== Road ===
The IFSD has links to the nearby M8 Motorway, which runs through Central Glasgow. The motorway connects the city with Edinburgh, Livingston, Glasgow Airport, Paisley, Erskine Bridge and Greenock.

=== Pedestrian ===
The Tradeston Bridge, completed in 2009, allows access by foot or bicycle over the Clyde between the IFSD and the Tradeston district, a feature which was previously lacking from the area requiring pedestrians to make an 800-metre (900-yard) detour via the George V Bridge to reach the same point.

== Buildings and notable residents ==
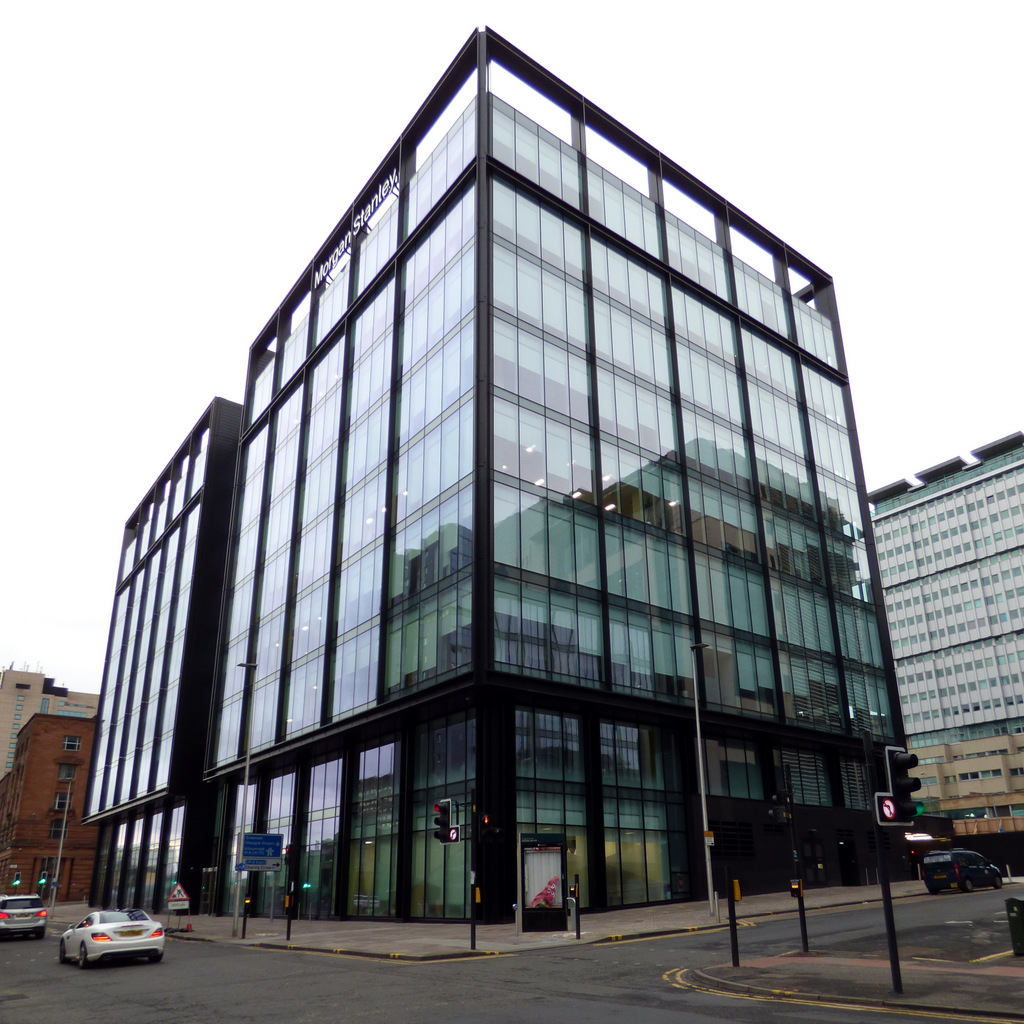
Offices of Morgan Stanley at the corner of Douglas Street, part of the IFSD

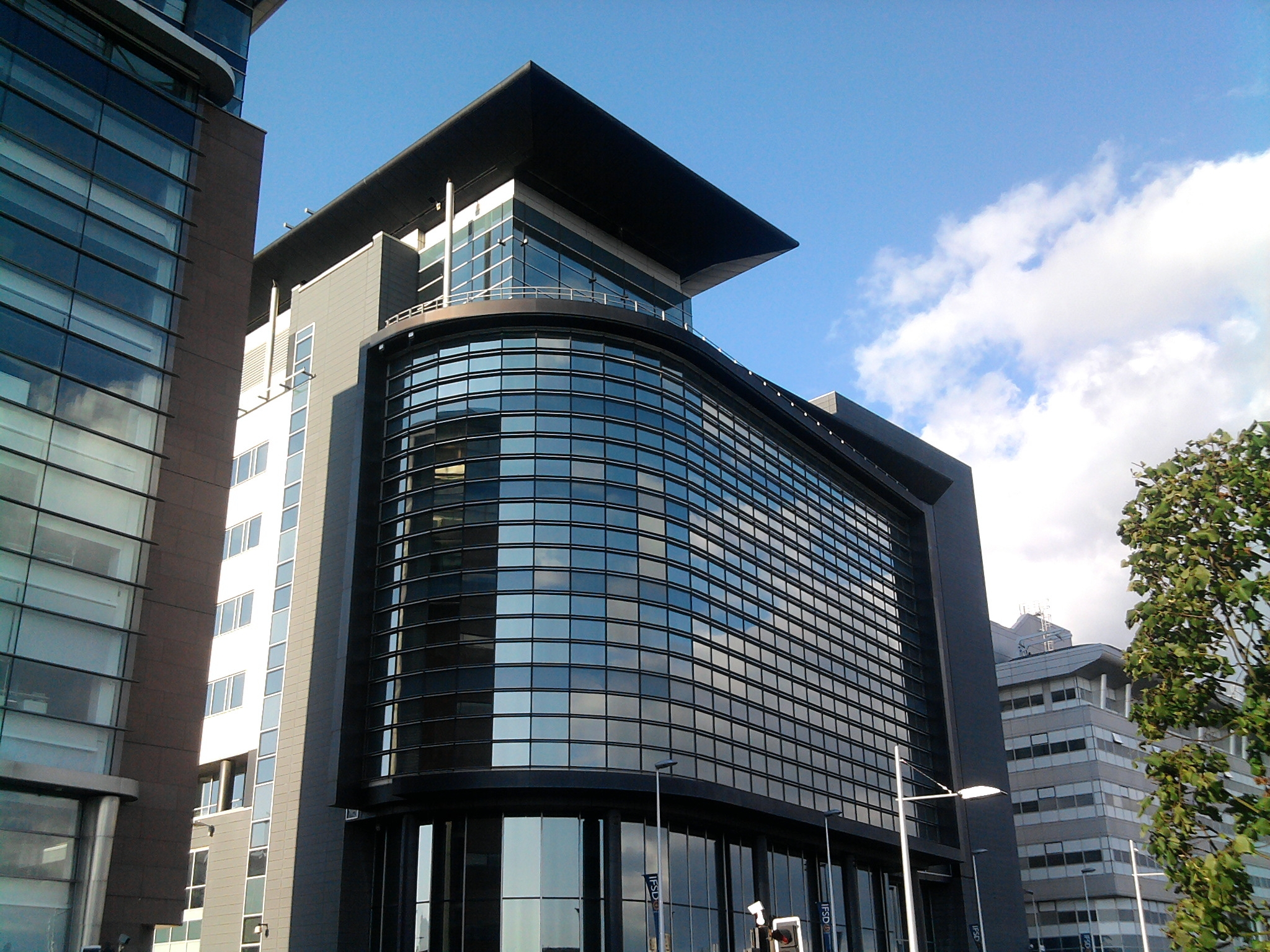
Scottish Government offices at 5 Atlantic Quay

Notable tenants of the International Financial Services District are Direct Line Group Chubb, Atkins Credit Suisse, Direct Line, Barclays, BNP Paribas, JPMorgan Chase, NFU Mutual, Morgan Stanley, JPMorgan Chase, SWIP, esure, HM Revenue and Customs, Scottish and Southern Energy, Scottish Courts and Tribunals Service, Department for Work and Pensions, Aon. Locations within the district and companies occupying premises are indicated below:

=== Completed and operational ===
Site	Tenant(s)
14-18 Cadogan Street	Direct Line Group
200 Broomielaw	Vacant
1 Atlantic Quay	Department for Work and Pensions
2 Atlantic Quay	Lloyds Banking Group
3 Atlantic Quay	Scottish Courts and Tribunals Service
4 Atlantic Quay	BDO Stoy Hayward LLP; Balfour Beatty
5 Atlantic Quay	Scottish Government
6 Atlantic Quay	Credit Suisse; Direct Line
Aurora Building	Barclays; BNP Paribas
Alhambra House	JPMorgan Chase
Centenary House	NFU Mutual
122 Waterloo Street	Morgan Stanley
45 Waterloo Street	JPMorgan Chase
Cornerstone	Scottish Widows Investment Partnership
Equinox	esure
One Waterloo Street	SSE
Sentinel Building	Aon
Sixty7	Vacant
Buchanan Wharf	Barclay's Bank; Student Loans Company
1 Atlantic Square	HM Revenue and Customs
2 Atlantic Square	Atkins; BDO Global; Burness Paull; Siemens
177 Bothwell Street	Clydesdale Bank; Virgin Money
Cadworks, 41 West Campbell Street	TLT LLP RBC Brewin Dolphin SThree Plc OVO Energy

=== Under construction ===
Name	Area	Completion Date	Status
33 Cadogan Street	300,000 sq ft	Awaiting Update	Under Construction

== Notes ==
- Glasgow IFSD (2010) Glasgow International Financial Services District, Leaflet.
- Glasgow IFSD (2010) Glasgow International Financial Service District, Website, Available from:.
