= Charles Atherton (civil engineer) =

British civil engineer

Charles Atherton MICE
- Born: 1805; Calne, Wiltshire, England
- Died: 24 May 1875 (aged 69–70); Sandown, Isle of Wight, England
- Education: Queens' College, Cambridge
- Spouse: Christina Ferrie
- Parent(s): Nathan Atherton, Charlotte Adam
- Engineering career
- Discipline: Marine engineering
- Institutions: Woolwich Dockyard, Devonport Dockyard
- Employers: Thomas Telford, Trustees of the River Clyde, Claude Girdwood and Co., British Government
- Projects: St Katharine Docks, Dean Bridge, Glasgow Bridge, RMS Don Juan, Dyle River project, Lachine Canal, St. Lawrence River improvements, Woolwich Dockyard steam factory complex
- Significant design: Marine engines, steam machinery improvements, safety improvements for steamships
- Significant advance: Marine boiler classification, steamship ventilation, engine classification, tonnage registration
- Awards: Royal Society of Arts medal (1855)

Charles Atherton MICE (1805 – 24 May 1875) was a British scientific engineer from Calne, Wiltshire. He was appointed as chief engineer and inspector of steam machinery at Her Majesty's Woolwich Dockyard in 1847; and a second time between 1851 and 1862. He served in the same capacity at Her Majesty's Devonport Dockyard between 1848 and 1851.

== Early life ==
Atherton was born into a wealthy landowning family from Wiltshire. He was the third son of Nathan Atherton (1775–1831), a solicitor who practiced in his home town of Calne, Wiltshire. His mother was Charlotte Adam (1776–1826).

Atherton attended Queens' College, Cambridge from the age of nineteen and undertook a four-year course fit for the engineering profession.

== Career ==
Atherton became a scientific engineer, at a time when the practice of the profession was not formalised, and exact principles were still to be laid down. His focus was marine engineering, when steamships were comparatively in their infancy.

After graduation he entered the employ of the engineer Thomas Telford as a wrangler, on St Katharine Docks in London. Upon these works being completed in 1830, he was sent to Edinburgh, to superintend the erection of the Dean Bridge. He contributed an account of its construction to the Encyclopedia Britannica, which is quoted by Thomas Telford in his "Life and Works".

During 1832, Atherton transferred to Glasgow, initially to superintend as resident engineer the construction of Glasgow Bridge by John Gibb. Subsequently, upon recommendation of James Walker, he was appointed by the Trustees of the River Clyde as their resident engineer.

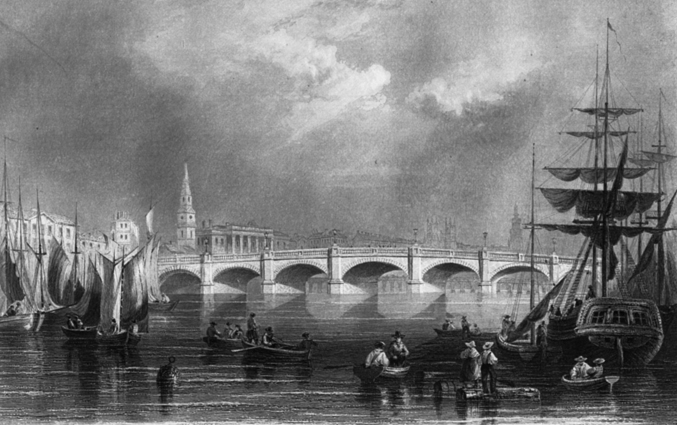
Steel engraving of a scene beside Glasgow Bridge, 1866

He prepared a plan for extending a wooden wharf on the south side of the Broomielaw Harbour. However, in 1834, he resigned from his appointment under the Trustees of the River Clyde, to take on the management of the old-established business of Claude Girdwood and Co, iron founders and engineers, in Glasgow, where he remained until 1837. It was here that Atherton was able to focus on steam machinery design and build. He was responsible for several marine engines, notably for the steamer RMS Don Juan, being constructed in Liverpool for the Peninsular Steam Company.

Atherton collaborated on an infrastructure engineering project on the Dyle River in Mechelen, Belgium. Thereafter, he relocated to North America, and was engaged for two years under the Canadian Colonial Government, conducting operations for the improvement of the navigation of the St. Lawrence River, along with deepening of the Lachine Canal, to allow heavier ships to pass through, since hydraulic power was introduced to the industries located on its banks. Atherton also carried out surveys and investigations of Lake Saint Pierre. It was during this time that Canada was established under the Act of Union. Upon leaving Canada, he spent a year working in the United States, returning to England in 1845.

In 1846, he was appointed assistant to the chief engineer in Woolwich Dockyard, and assumed the role of chief engineer on 6 April 1847. In the preceding decade the dockyard had found a new lease of life as a specialist yard for marine steam engineering (a relatively new technology which was being developed commercially at nearby Millwall). Immediately prior to Atherton’s tenure, new buildings were constructed for steam manufacturing and maintenance, including a boiler shop for manufacturing boilers, foundries for brass, copper and iron work, and an erecting shop for assembling the steam engines; by 1843 all had been integrated into a single factory complex, with a single large chimney drawing on all the various forges and furnaces by way of underground flues. Integral to the creation of the steam factory was the conversion of two mast ponds (which lay to the north of what is now Ruston Road) into steam basins, where ships could moor alongside the factory while their engines and boilers were fitted. One of these basins was provided with its own dry dock (No. 1 Dock). Although the steam factory was part of the dockyard, it had a high degree of independence: it was accessed by its own gate (known as the West Gate or Steam Factory Gate) and overseen by its own official, the chief engineer.

As chief engineer of Woolwich Dockyard, Atherton was called upon to give evidence before various Parliamentary Committees appointed to inquire into Dockyard affairs. Records show that his recommendations in 1847 were proposed to George Eden, 1st Earl of Auckland and subsequently endorsed, making way for expansion in build capacity and use of new technology at the dockyard.

The Illustrated London News reported on 19 June 1847, complete with illustrations of Atherton hosting the visit of the Russian Royal tour party to Woolwich Dockyard, where he demonstrated British steam technological advancements to the Grand Duke Konstantin Nikolayevich of Russia (1827–1892).

During 1848, Atherton made improvements to a Minx class steam vessel, an iron half-sister to wooden Teazer. The screw propeller submitted by a Mr. B Woodcroft was slightly altered on the suggestion of Atherton, in his capacity as chief engineer and inspector of steam machinery at the dockyard. Woodcroft's screw propelled the vessel at the rate of nine knots per hour, and when at its greatest velocity the engines performed about three revolutions per minute more than with any of the other screws.

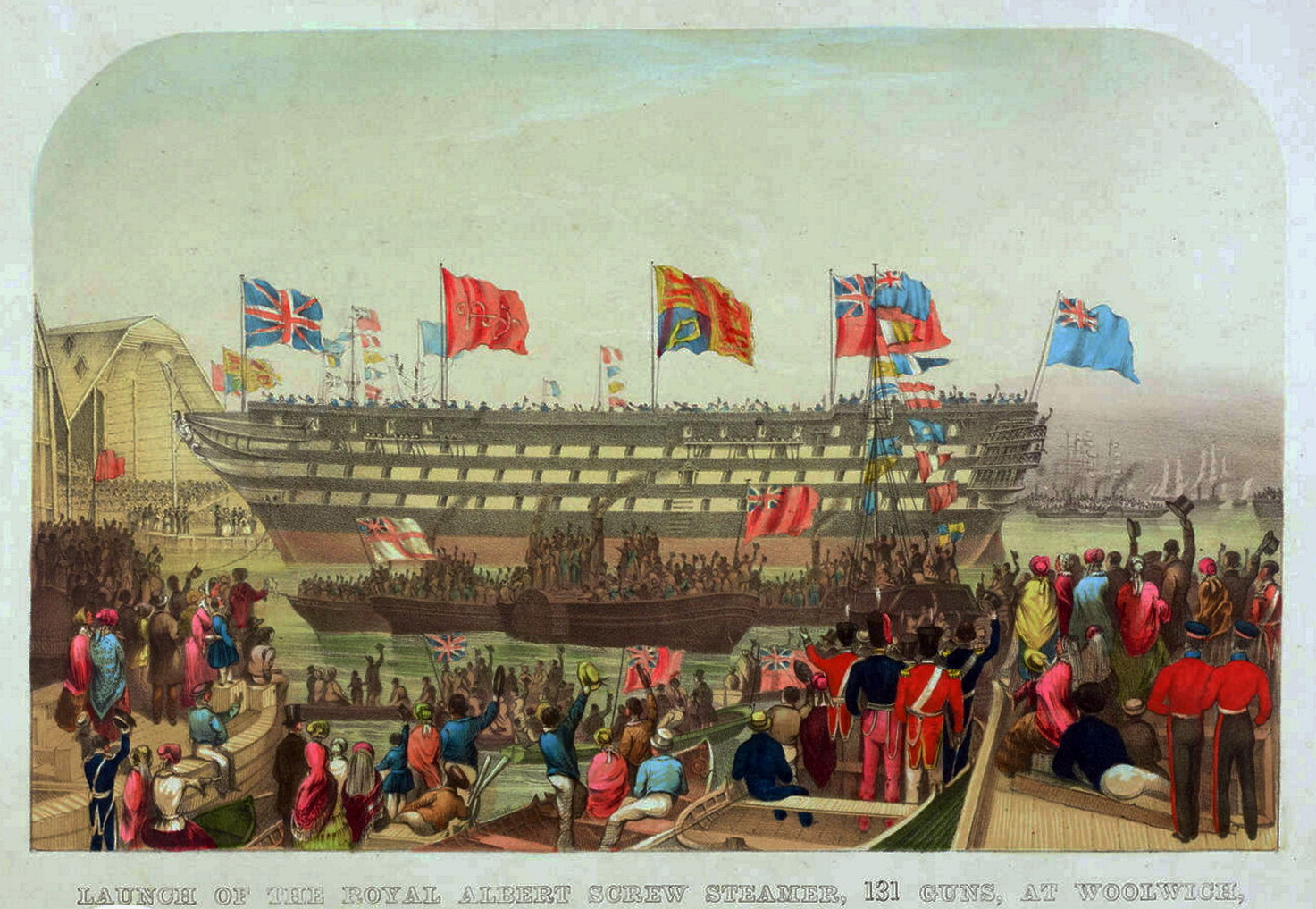
View of the Royal Dockyard, Woolwich, during the launch of the Royal Albert screw steamer in the presence of Queen Victoria and Prince Albert, and 60,000 spectators (1854). Engraving by unknown artist.

Atherton had considerable influence within the British government, and reported his professional views to the Admiralty throughout his employ. His reports were not confined merely to matters of engine detail, but engineering processes and improvements in the safety of steam ships, which included Engine Classification (1846); Proposal for making the Government Factories Practical Training schools for Naval Engineers (1847); Marine Boiler Classification (1847 and 1848); Steam-ship Ventilation by the Agency of the Funnel, and Proposed Boiler Arrangement for Ships of War (1849 and 1850).

His patent of "Steam Engine" (No. 12,960) was registered on 7 February 1850.

Atherton made an impact during a period of rapid industrialisation and exhibited his inventions at the Great Exhibition of 1851.

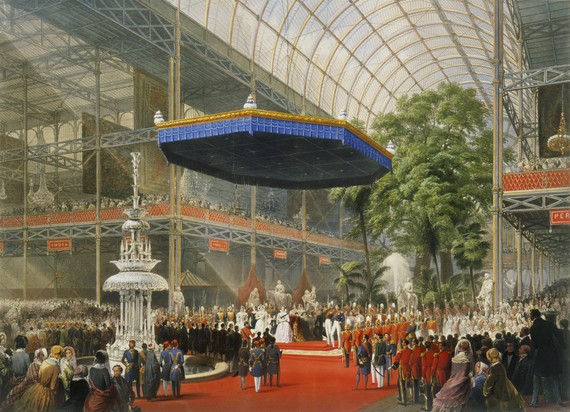
Opening of the Great Exhibition in 1851 by Queen Victoria and Prince Albert

Atherton's scientific, architectural, engineering and educational works were published by John Weale and John Grant of Woolwich on the following subjects: Marine Engine Construction and Classification (1851); Steam-ship Capability (1853), and a second edition, with Appendix on the Capability of large Ships (1854); and Capability of Steamships for Mercantile Transport Service, a paper for which he received the medal of the Royal Society of Arts in 1855. In mercantile shipping, he was recognised during his lifetime for having published papers on Tonnage Registration, Mercantile Steam Transport Economy, and Freight Charges as affected by Differences in the Dynamic Properties of Steamships; the three last having been communicated to the British Association in Cheltenham in 1856.

He transferred to Her Majesty's Devonport Dockyard in December 1848, as chief engineer and inspector of steam machinery and remained in this role until 8 September 1851, when he was re-transferred to Woolwich Dockyard, where he remained until 26 July 1862, upon retirement from service to Her Majesty's Government.

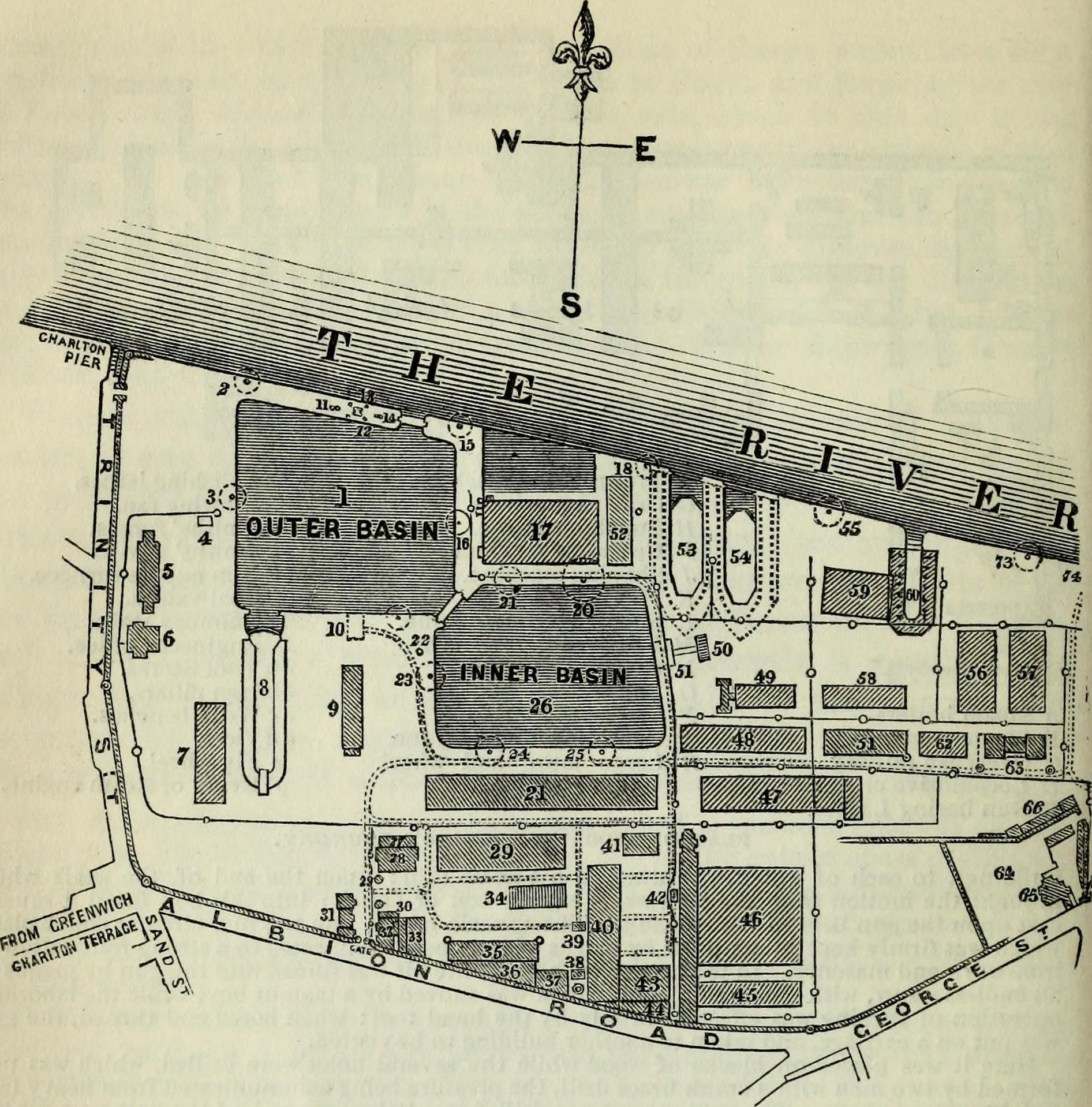
Map of the Woolwich Dockyard in 1854. The steam factory complex is just south of the Inner Basin.

Atherton established himself as a consulting engineer in Whitehall, for which his broad range of construction and mechanical engineering experience suited him. He pursued this career path for a further eight years until retirement. During this time, he continued to register patents for buoys, pontoons and beacons in multiple countries. His final registered patent was related to steering ships.

== Legacy ==
His influence on improving safety of all types of ships – mercantile, passenger and Royal Navy – has been significant and will have saved multiple lives by way of a reduction in the risk of accidents, often arising from gross negligence and human error.

During his lifetime, the Officers of the Board of Trade had a duty of surveying passenger steamers periodically and reporting that the "Hull & Machinery" of the vessel was safe before issuing a Certificate or License. If it was withheld, then the vessel was prohibited from carrying passengers. Thomas Farrer, 1st Baron Farrer included Atherton's detailed reports and recommendations when corresponding with Michael Faraday in 1859.

He was a prolific author of articles in The Times, Mechanics Magazine and the Journal of the Society of Arts. He also assessed those wishing to pursue their careers in a specialist field of study.

The National Portrait Gallery, London has a silhouette by Auguste Edouart, from 1830 that includes Atherton whilst a bachelor.

== Memberships ==
Atherton was a member of the Institution of Civil Engineers, founded in 1818, having been elected a member on 19 February 1828, when Thomas Telford was president of the body, and he is said to have acted for some time as its secretary. He was a frequent attendant at the meetings of this Institution, and used it as a platform for enforcing his views on the subject he had most at heart; the improvement of the marine steam engine.

== Personal life ==
He married Christina Ferrie (1813–1862), the daughter of Robert Ferrie of Blairtummock, Glasgow.

His brother, Nathan Atherton (1798–1885) married Sabina Bernard and had a law practice in London, following his father's footsteps. Sabina Atherton was recorded as a visitor at his Devonport home in the 1851 census, months before their return to London.

In 1870, Atherton retired to Sandown in the Isle of Wight, where he passed the last five years of his life in seclusion, his chief recreations being the care of an orchard-house, and taking astronomical observations with a 3-inch telescope. He died at the age of 75, on 24 May 1875, at his home on the Isle of Wight.

== See also ==
- Henry Bell (engineer), an earlier steamship engineer
