= Glasgow Bridge, Glasgow =

Bridge in Glasgow, Scotland

Glasgow Bridge
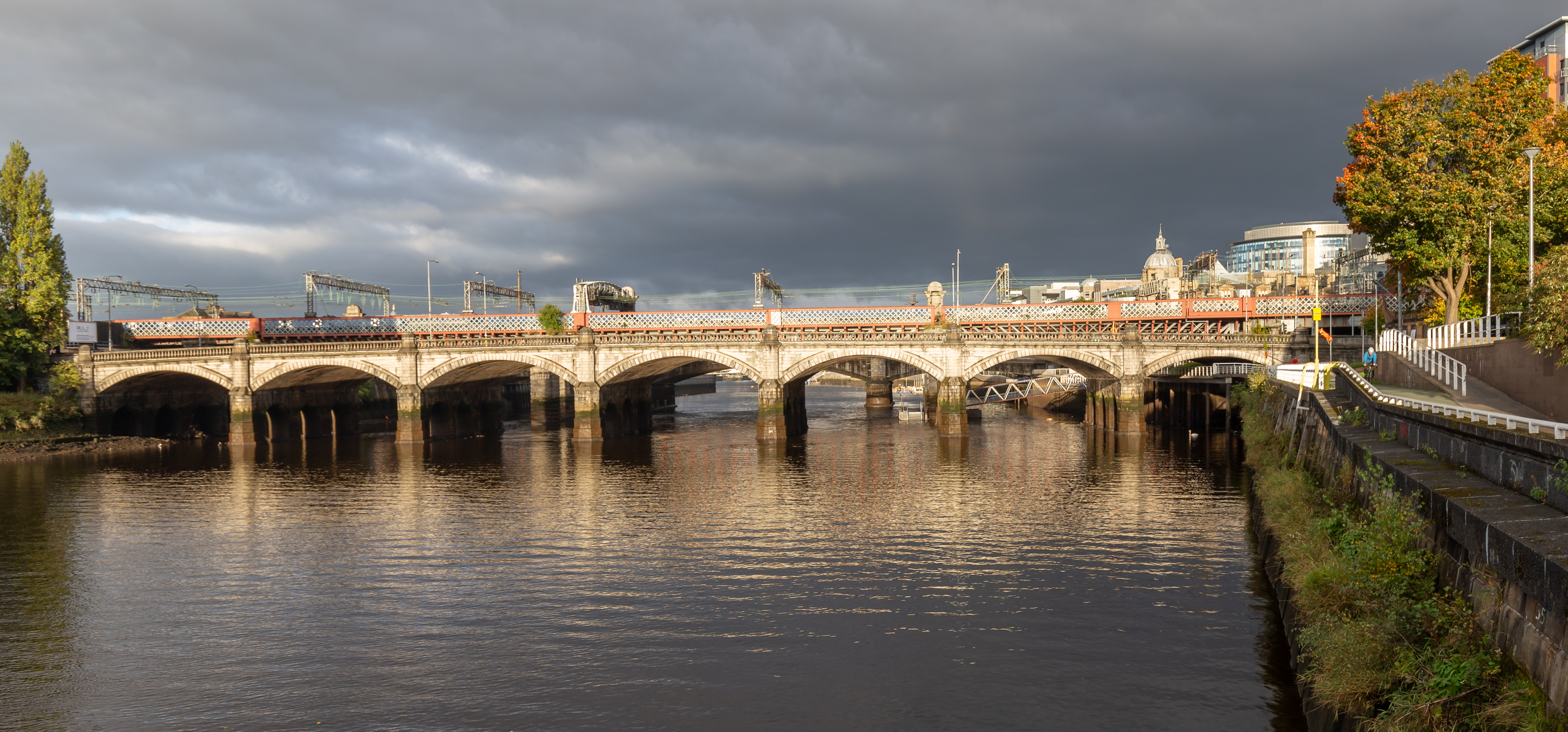
- The altered bridge seen in 2018 with the Caledonian Railway Bridge behind
- Coordinates: 55.8555°N 4.2578°W
- OS grid reference: NS 58763 64785
- Carries: A77
- Crosses: River Clyde
- Locale: Glasgow
- Preceded by: South Portland Street Suspension Bridge
- Followed by: Caledonian Railway Bridge

Listed Building – Category B
- Official name: Jamaica Street, Glasgow Bridge
- Designated: 20 July 1988
- Reference no.: LB33062

Location
- Interactive map of Glasgow Bridge

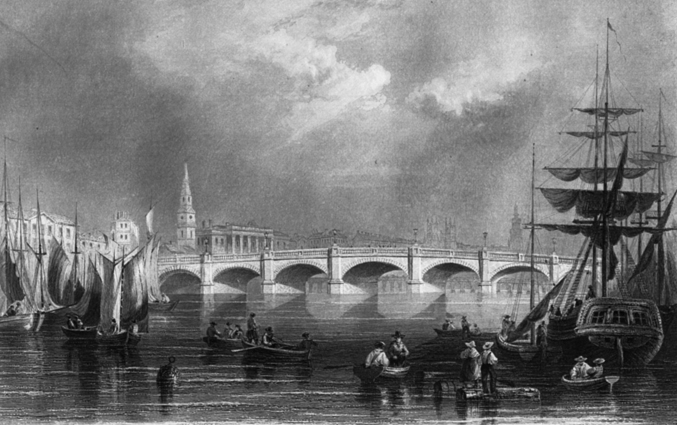
Steel engraving of a scene by the Telford-designed bridge no later than 1866

The Glasgow Bridge spans the River Clyde in Glasgow linking the city centre to Laurieston, Tradeston and Gorbals. Formerly known as Broomielaw Bridge, it is at the bottom of Jamaica Street near Central Station, and is colloquially known as the Jamaica Bridge.

The original bridge was authorised by the Clyde Bridge Act 1758 (32 Geo. 2. c. 62) and completed in 1772, and was designed by William Mylne and built by civil engineer John Smeaton. Its seven-arch structure was honoured by Thomas Telford, the first president of the Institution of Civil Engineers, who replaced it in 1833 with a design built by John Gibb & Son for £34,000. One of Telford's colleagues, Charles Atherton, was the resident engineer for the Works. It became the first in Glasgow to be lit by electricity. Between 1895 and 1899 it was replaced with the current wider bridge which incorporated Telford's stonework and expanded the arches to accommodate larger ships. The present structure is protected as a category B listed building.

== Proposed bridge ==
The Glasgow Bridge was also the name of a proposed bridge. Designed by the Richard Rogers Partnership, it was to be a curved, ramped deck bridge, using a cable stayed compression arch to provide an additional route from Broomielaw to Tradeston. However, late in 2006 funding was withdrawn for this project. The Tradeston Bridge has since been built to serve this function.

== See also ==
- List of bridges in Scotland
