= McDonogh 35 College Preparatory Charter High School =

Location
- 4000 Cadillac Street; New Orleans, Louisiana 70122; United States
- 29°58′08″N 90°03′55″W

Information
- Type: Public Charter; College Preparatory
- Motto: A Choice, Not an Echo
- Established: 1917
- School district: New Orleans Public Schools
- Faculty: 48.93 (on FTE basis)
- Grades: Education in the United States#School grades
- Enrollment: 1008 (2010–11)
- Student to teacher ratio: 20.6:1
- Colors: Maroon and gold
- Athletics conference: LHSAA
- Sports: Baseball (Boys); Basketball (Boys JV); Basketball (Boys Varsity); Basketball (Girls Varsity); Football (Boys JV); Football (Boys Varsity); Softball (Girls); Track and Field (Boys); Track and Field (Girls); Volleyball (Girls JV); Volleyball (Girls Varsity)
- Mascot: Roneagle
- Nickname: Thirty-five; Three Five
- Team name: Roneagles
- Website: mcdonogh35.inspirenolacharterschools.org

McDonogh 35 College Preparatory Charter High School is a charter public high school in New Orleans, Louisiana. It is a part of New Orleans Public Schools and InspireNOLA charter operator. The school was named after John McDonogh.

== History ==
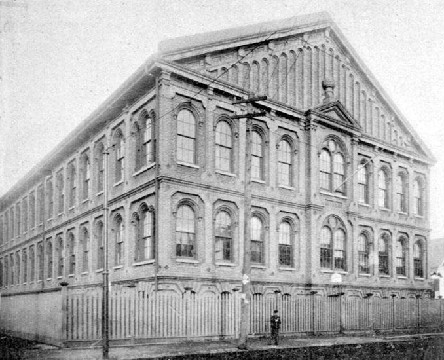
McDonogh School 13 circa 1900; in 1917 this building would be repurposed as the first home of McDonogh 35.

Prior to 1917, during the era of segregated school systems in the Southern U.S., no public high school existed in New Orleans for African-American pupils. Those interested in pursuing an education beyond the eighth grade had to attend one of the city's three private secondary schools for blacks: Leland College, New Orleans University, or Straight College.

In 1917, a group of citizens met to petition the Orleans Parish School System to convert McDonogh 13 Boys' School from a white elementary school to a secondary educational facility for black pupils. The petition was granted and in the fall of 1917. McDonogh 35 Senior High School became recognized as a four-year high school. McDonogh 35 remained the only public four-year high school for African Americans until the L. B. Landry school transitioned from an elementary into a high school in 1942. Booker T. Washington also opened its doors in 1942 for African Americans.

Over the years, McDonogh 35 has changed its location four times. The original building at 655 South Rampart Street was destroyed when Hurricane Betsy struck New Orleans in 1965, and for the next four years the school was temporarily located in the former United States Federal Court House Building at 600 Camp Street. In 1969, students and faculty were moved into the school facility at 133 St. Ann Street that formerly housed McDonogh 41 Elementary School. In September 1972, the facility relocated to 1331 Kerlerec Street in the Tremé neighborhood. During the 1992-1993 school year, McDonogh 35 was recognized as a National Blue Ribbon School of Excellence by the United States Department of Education.

By April 13, 2006, McDonogh 35 was one of six public high schools that had re-opened since Katrina. Of them, it was the only one in a Downtown neighborhood. According to Philip White, the principal, initially the administration had plans to accommodate 800 students but found fewer due to the effects of the hurricane. One month later, the enrollment went over 1,000 students and the administration was forced to stop accepting students.

The current facility which opened on August 20, 2015 is located on 16 acres in the Bayou District at 4000 Cadillac Street, the former Phillips/Waters school site. The Louisiana Recovery School District allocated $55 million in Federal Emergency Management Agency recovery funds tied to this site to construct the new state of the art McDonogh 35 College Preparatory High School.

On December 20, 2018, the Orleans Parish School Board awarded the InspireNOLA charter group a two-year management contract to operate McDonogh 35 College Preparatory High School, which will only have eleventh and twelfth grades. Once the students graduate, that school will close.

The school board also announced that InspireNOLA was awarded a contract to create a charter high school on the same campus. In 2019, McDonogh 35 College Preparatory Charter High School will start with ninth grade and add a grade each year until it reaches twelfth grade.

== The "Roneagle" ==
A "Roneagle" or "Ironeagle" is a mythical bird fashioned after the American bald eagle however because of its solid iron constitution, it was stronger, swifter, larger and more resourceful than all other birds—a symbol of strength and courage meant to inspire the students of the school. The first issue of the school's yearbook in 1928 describes the mythical creature.

== Academics ==
Christine Woyshner and Chara Haeussler Bohan, editors of Histories of Social Studies and Race: 1865-2000, said that "Despite the pressures of a state-mandated standardized curriculum and a corresponding accountability policy, in the late twentieth and early twenty-first centuries, McDonogh 35 retained a strong academic curriculum that placed social justice and students at its center.

== Athletics ==
McDonogh 35 College Preparatory Charter athletics competes in the Louisiana High School Athletic Association.

== Notable alumni ==
=== McDonogh 35 College Preparatory High School ===
- Delvin Breaux, NFL Cornerback
- Carlos Henderson, NFL Wide Receiver
- DeJon Jarreau, NBA Point Guard
- Rob49, Rapper
- Clifford Chatman, NFL Defensive Back
- Regis Prograis, Boxer

=== McDonogh 35 Senior High School ===
- Joan Bernard Armstrong, first female elected judge in Louisiana and first African American chief judge of the Louisiana 4th Circuit Court of Appeals
- Israel Meyer Augustine Jr., first black elected judge of Orleans Parish Criminal District Court
- Rev. Abraham Lincoln "A.L." Davis, founder of Southern Christian Leadership Conference and first black city councilman in New Orleans
- Roger Donald Dickerson, pianist, composer, and educator
- Michael S. Harrison (class of 1987), Superintendent, New Orleans Police Department
- Jason Hughes, member of the Louisiana House of Representatives
- Geneva Handy Southall (class of 1941), musician, musicologist, professor, and writer
- Jared Brossett (class of 2000), Councilman, City of New Orleans
- Punkie Johnson (class of 2003), actress and stand-up comedian, current featured player on Saturday Night Live
- Dr. Janina Jeff (class of 2003), geneticist and host/executive producer of In Those Genes podcast
- Chris Clark (class of 2003), NFL offensive tackle
- Dr. Calvin Mackie (class of 1985), motivational speaker and entrepreneur
- Ernest Nathan Morial, first African-American mayor of New Orleans (1978–86)
- Ernest Polk, DD, National Accounts Sales Executive Shell Oil Company, Winner of the Laurel Society Award for Top Marketer, Owner of New Breed Investments and RockinSoul Music
- Marguerite Polk, Award winning mathematician and teacher for Orleans Parish Schools, Zeta Phi Beta Sorority Member
- Michael Smith (class of 1997) NFL reporter for ESPN
- Neil Smith (class of 1984), NFL defensive end and two-time Super Bowl champion
- Darryl Willis, Vice President in charge of claims for BP in the Deepwater Horizon oil spill
