= Burness =

Burness is a surname. Notable people with the surname include:

- Don Burness (1919–1987), American basketball player
- Gordon Burness (1906–1989), soccer player
- Kevin Burness (born 1965), Northern Irish professional darts player
- Pete Burness (1904–1969), American animator

== See also ==
- Burness, California, unincorporated community in California, United States
- Burness Paull & Williamsons, a Scottish firm of solicitors
