= 1 Atlantic Square =

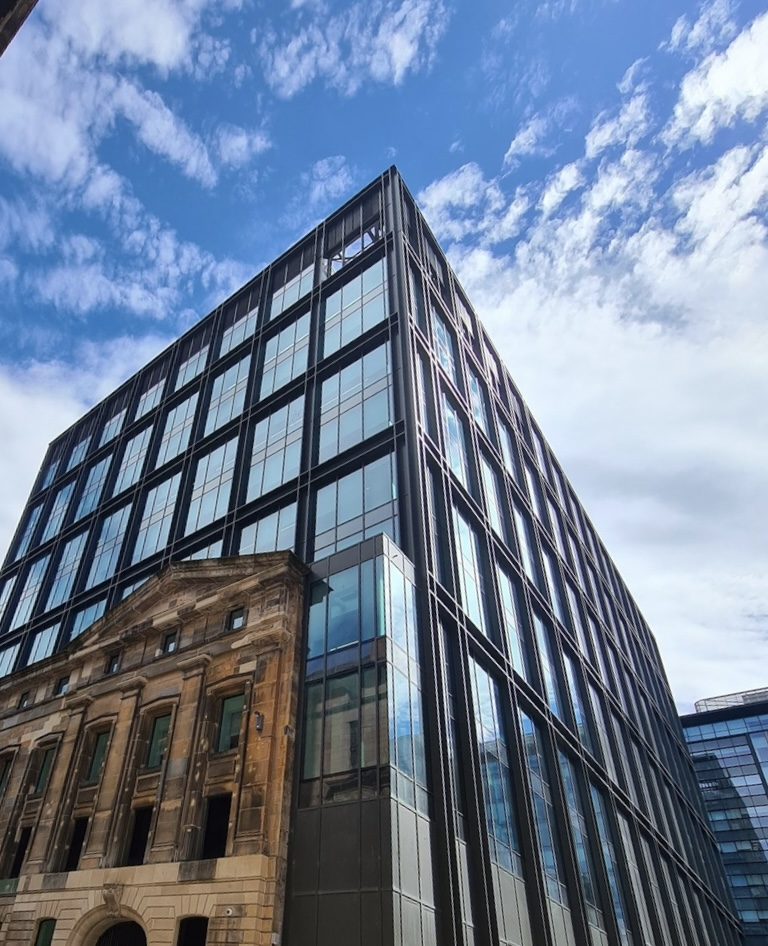
- 1 Atlantic Square

General information
- Architectural style: Modernist
- Location: Atlantic Square, Argyle Street, Glasgow, Scotland, G2 8JQ
- Coordinates: 55.858357°N 4.263013°W
- Year built: 2018–2022
- Groundbreaking: March 2018
- Construction started: March 2018
- Completed: 2022
- Opened: June 2022
- Cost: £150 million
- Owner: HM Revenue and Customs

Technical details
- Size: 300,000 sqft
- Floor count: 10
- Floor area: 284,000 sqft

Design and construction
- Architects: BAM Design; Cooper Cromer
- Architecture firm: BAM Construction

Other information
- Parking: Yes

1 Atlantic Square is a high-rise office building located at Atlantic Square within the city of Glasgow, Scotland. It is currently the Scottish headquarters of HM Revenue and Customs and second headquarters of the Cabinet Office, and is one of two buildings located at Atlantic Square, with the smaller 2 Atlantic Square, a 7-storey office building, situated next to the building. The 300,000 sqft building cost £150 million to construct by BAM Construction (BAM TCP Atlantic Square) and was designed by BAM Design and Cooper Cromer.

== Background ==
Planning permission was submitted by BAM TCP Atlantic Square to Glasgow City Council on 28 September 2017. The planning application stated that the intended usage for development was the erection of mixed use development at the site.

On 16 October 2017, Glasgow City Council made a decision relating to the planning application which had been submitted, and the council issued no objections to the proposed development and agreed on the discharges of obligations. There were, however, a total of 11 constraints associated with the proposed development at the site.

== Construction ==
TCP ATLANTIC SQUARE LIMITED, based in London, had purchased the site in April 2002 for £5,150,000. In February 2018, LGIM Real Assets (Legal & General) confirmed that construction on 1 Atlantic Square was set to commence in March 2018. Prior to construction beginning, HM Revenue and Customs had already signed a 20-year lease on the building, making it the agencies main HQ in Scotland. Construction was completed by 2022, and HMRC began to move 2,600 HMRC staff and 270 Cabinet Office staff in to the building. By 2025, it is expected that more than 3,500 civil servants will be based at the office.

== 2 Atlantic Square ==
2 Atlantic Square (Scottish Gaelic: 1 Ceàrnag an Atlantaig) is a 7-storey Grade A office building located within the International Financial Services District, direct next to 1 Atlantic Square. 2 Atlantic Square is the second development at Atlantic Square following the taller tower 1 Atlantic Square situated next to the building.

Hailed as a "flagship development" within the city of Glasgow, the building is home to some of the world's most "prestigious" companies including BDO Global, Atkins and Siemens.

=== Background ===
Planning permission was submitted by BAM TCP Atlantic Square to Glasgow City Council on 28 September 2017. The planning application stated that the intended usage for development was the erection of mixed use development at the site.

On 16 October 2017, Glasgow City Council made a decision relating to the planning application which had been submitted, and the council issued no objections to the proposed development and agreed on the discharges of obligations. There were, however, a total of 11 constraints associated with the proposed development at the site.

The 2 Atlantic Square development is part of a wider Scottish investment by BDO, with the company investing in refurbishment work at an office development in Edinburgh. 2 Atlantic Square is marketed as a Grade A office space development, with 77,219 sq ft of space available for businesses. Representing a Grade A vacancy rate of 0.34%, 2 Atlantic Square was in part responsible for Glasgow's office rents growing to £35.25 per sq ft in the last quarter of 2021.

=== Construction ===
TCP ATLANTIC SQUARE LIMITED, based in London, had purchased the site in April 2002 for £5,150,000. In February 2018, LGIM Real Assets (Legal & General) confirmed that construction on 1 Atlantic Square was set to commence in March 2018.

=== Features ===
2 Atlantic Square features 24/7 security as well as featuring blast proof glass.

In 2021, the planning department at Glasgow City Council granted planning permission for a 204 seated restaurant with permission granted for the restaurant to sell alcohol. The restaurant is located on the ground level of 2 Atlantic Square, with the remaining floors being office space.

=== Tenants ===
The building has a variety of tenants either owning or renting office space. As of September 2023, the current tenants are:

FL#	Companies
7	Plant / PV panels / green roof
6	Atkins
5	Atkins; BDO Global
4	Burness Paull
3	Siemens
2	Vacant
1	Vacant
Ground	Retail / reception / showers
Lower Ground	Parking & cycle storage/lockers & shower facilities

== See also ==
- International Financial Services District - Glasgow
