= Samuel Peters =

Samuel Peters may refer to:

- Samuel Peters (clergyman) (1735–1826), Connecticut Anglican clergyman and historian
- Samuel R. Peters (1842–1910), U.S. Representative from Kansas
- Samuel Jarvis Peters (1801–1855), American businessman and education activist
- Samuel Peters (Louisiana politician) (1835–1873), American educator and politician
- John Samuel Peters (1772–1858), Governor of the U.S. state of Connecticut
