= Caledonian Railway Bridge =

Bridge in Glasgow, Scotland

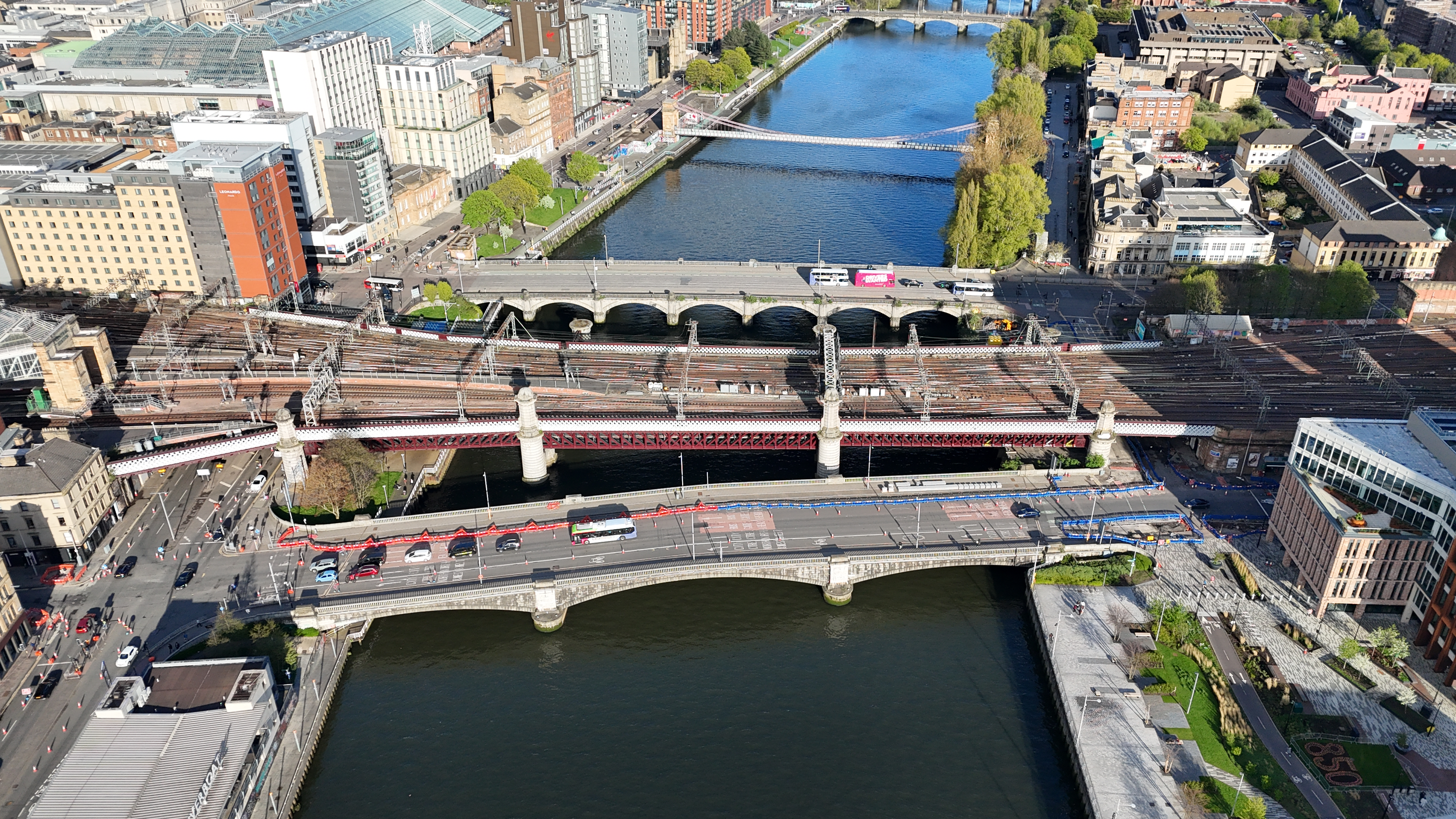
- The Caledonian Railway Bridge in the middle
- Coordinates: 55°51′20.8″N 4°15′32.2″W
- Crosses: River Clyde

Characteristics
- Material: Steel
- Total length: 702 feet 6 inches (214.12 m)

History
- Opened: 1905 (second bridge)

Location
- Interactive map of Caledonian Railway Bridge

The Caledonian Railway Bridge is a bridge crossing the River Clyde at Broomielaw in Scotland. It is adjacent to Glasgow Central Station and has road bridges close to both sides: George V Bridge to the west and Glasgow Bridge to the east.

== First bridge ==
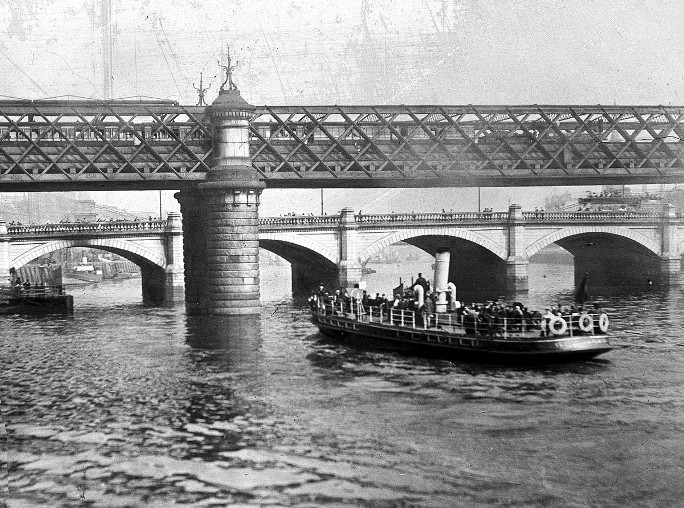
The first bridge

The first bridge was built between 1876 and 1878 for the Caledonian Railway Company and opened on 1 August 1879. It was engineered by Blyth and Cunningham and built by Sir William Arrol & Co. It consisted of wrought iron lattice girders linked at the top by a light arched lattice girder, and carried on a cast iron arch (visible in the photograph) over twin piers in the river. The piers are formed of cast iron cylinders sunk to bedrock and filled with concrete, and then extended above the river with Dalbeattie granite.

The approach span over Clyde Place to the south was 60 feet (18 m) long and over Broomielaw to the north of the river was 90 feet (27 m) long. The navigation spans were 164 feet (50 m), 184 feet (56 m) and 152 feet (46 m) long. The bridge carried four tracks into the new Glasgow Central Station.

In 1966–1967, the girders and tracks were removed, leaving the pillars in the water, after resignalling meant it was no longer needed.

== Second bridge ==
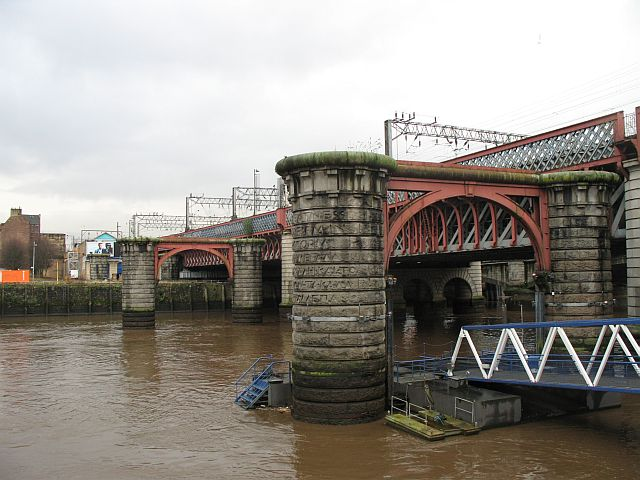
The piers of the first Caledonian railway bridge, with the second bridge next to it

The current, second bridge was built in 1899–1905 during the expansion of Central Station, to a design by D. A. Matheson, chief engineer of the Caledonian Railway. Arrol and Co. was the contractor for this bridge as well.

The foundations for the bridge are rectangular sunk caissons, sunk by the compressed air chamber method used on the Forth Bridge to a depth of up to 48 feet (15 m) below the river bed. The central span is 194 feet (59 m) long with Linville truss girders 15 feet 9 inches (4.80 m) deep. The parapet girders are around 10 feet (3.0 m) deep, and suspended on curved brackets. There are a minimum of eight parallel main girders in the width. The spans are of lengths 160 feet (49 m), 200 feet (61 m) and 178 feet (54 m), and the structure contains 11,000 tonnes (11,000 long tons; 12,000 short tons) of steel. The total length of the bridge between the abutments is 702 feet 6 inches (214.12 m).

The bridge varies in width from 35 to 62.5 metres (115 to 205 ft) and carries up to ten tracks. It leads immediately into Glasgow Central Station on the north bank of the river. At the time of its opening, it was believed to be the widest railway bridge in existence.

== See also ==
- List of bridges in Scotland
