= Bernhard Heiden =

American classical composer

External image
- Composer Bernhard Heiden

Bernhard Heiden (b. Frankfurt am Main, August 24, 1910; d. Bloomington, Indiana, April 30, 2000) was a Jewish emigre from Nazi Germany and a German-American composer who taught as a professor at the Indiana University School of Music from 1946 until his retirement in 1981.

The son of Martha (née Heiden-Heimer) and Ernst Levi, Heiden was originally named Bernhard Levi and later changed his name. Drawn to music as a youngster, he composed his first pieces at age six. When he began formal music lessons, he learned music theory in addition to three instruments: piano, clarinet, and violin. Following his secondary schooling at Frankfurt's noted Goethe Gymnasium, where a classmate was the later émigré author Richard Plant, Heiden enrolled at the Hochschule für Musik in Berlin in 1929 at the age of nineteen and studied music composition under Paul Hindemith, one of the foremost German composers of the twentieth century. In 1933, his last year at the Berlin conservatory, he was awarded the Mendelssohn Prize in composition. He was subsequently employed as an orchestral clarinetist.

In 1934 Heiden married pianist Cola de Joncheere, who had been a classmate at the Hochschule für Musik. In 1935 they left Nazi Germany and emigrated to Detroit, where Heiden taught at the Art Center Music School for eight years. During this time he conducted the Detroit Chamber Orchestra in addition to giving piano, harpsichord, and general chamber music recitals. After being naturalized as an American citizen in 1941, he enrolled in the United States Army in 1943 and served as an Assistant Bandmaster of the 445th Army Service Band, for which he made over 100 arrangements. After the close of World War II Heiden enrolled at Cornell University and received his Master's degree in 1946. That year he joined the faculty of the Indiana University School of Music, where he served as chair of the Composition Department until 1974. He was named an emeritus professor in 1981 and continued composing music up until his death at the age of 89 on April 30, 2000.

Heiden's music is described by composer Nicolas Slonimsky as "neoclassical in its formal structure, and strongly polyphonic in texture; it is distinguished also by its impeccable formal balance and effective instrumentation." Much of Heiden's music is for either wind or string chamber groups or solo instruments with piano, though he also wrote two symphonies, an opera (The Darkened City), a ballet ("Dreamers on a Slack Wire"), and vocal and incidental music for poetry and several of Shakespeare's plays.

His notable students include Roger Dickerson, Donald Erb, Frederick A. Fox, and Carol Ann Weaver. See: List of music students by teacher: G to J#Bernhard Heiden.

== Selected works ==
- Sonata for alto saxophone and piano (1937) - premiered by Larry Teal on 8 April 1937
- Sonata for viola and piano (1959)
- Quintet for French horn and string quartet (1952) - written for horn player John Barrows
- Diversion for alto saxophone and band (1943) - Composer also reduced it for alto saxophone and piano (1984)
- Fantasia Concertante for alto saxophone and band
- Five Short Pieces for flute
- Intrada for woodwind quintet and Alto Saxophone (1970) <CD: Cadenza 800 920 DDD (Bayer-Records, 1999)>
- Voyage for band (1991)
- Serenade for bassoon, violin, viola, and cello
- Clarinet trio (two B♭ clarinets and one bass clarinet)
- Quintet for clarinet and strings (1955)
- Solo for alto saxophone and piano (1969) – written for Eugene Rousseau
- Sonata for horn and piano (1939)
- Variations on “Liliburlero” for cello
- Sonatina for flute and piano (1958)
- Sonata for Piano, Four Hands (1946)
- The Darkened City (with libretto by Robert G. Kelly) (1962)
- "Dreamers on a Slack Wire" (ballet) (1953)
- Sonata for Cello and Piano (1958)
- Siena, for Cello and Piano (1961)
- Euphorion: Scene for Orchestra (1949)
- Concerto for Piano, Violin, Violincello and Orchestra (1956)
- Concertino for String Orchestra (1967)
- Concerto for Cello and Orchestra (1967)
- Concerto for Horn and Orchestra (1969)
- Concerto for Tuba and Orchestra (1976)
- Partita for Orchestra (1970)
- Solo for Alto Saxophone and Piano (1969) <CD: Cadenza 800 920 DDD (Bayer-Records, 1999)>
- Prelude, Theme and Variations for Alto Recorder (1994) <CD: Cadenza 800 920 DDD (Bayer-Records, 1999)>
- Preludes for Flute, Double Bass and Harp (1988)<CD: Cadenza 800 920 DDD (Bayer-Records, 1999)>
