= Janina Jeff =

American geneticist & bioinformatician (born 1985)

- Education: Spelman College (BS); Vanderbilt University (MS, PhD)
- Awards: ASHG Advocacy Award American Society of Human Genetics (2020); Sound Up Bootcamp Spotify (2018)
- Scientific career
- Workplaces: Illumina, Inc. Icahn School of Medicine at Mount Sinai; Vanderbilt University
- Thesis: The Genetics of Quantitative Traits Associated with Cardiovascular Disease in African Americans (2012)
- Website: In Those Genes Podcast website

Janina M. Jeff (juh-NEE-nuh; born September 10, 1985) is a US-based geneticist and a senior scientist at Illumina. She is specifically interested in identifying genetic variants that explain disease disparities across populations, as well as science communication. She was the first African American to earn a PhD in Human Genetics at Vanderbilt University.

Jeff is the host and executive producer of In Those Genes, a podcast show that links genetics, African American identity, and Black culture. Jeff is a 2020 American Society of Human Genetics (ASHG) Advocacy Award winner and won the inaugural Spotify Sound-Up Bootcamp in 2018.

In the podcast, Jeff refers to herself as a geneti-"SIS" and a storyteller. Jeff engages her listeners with personal stories and her scientific knowledge. Growing up, Jeff relates that she "asked big questions, set her own course, connected with her community, and then founded work that fit her."

In her younger years she questioned everything and when she didn't know the answer she saw it as a hindrance and now views it as an opportunity. Jeff discusses the ways in which human genome can provide data ultimately- develops treatments for diseases. She focuses on communities that are underrepresented in genetics research, specifically, African American communities.

== Early life and education ==
Jeff grew up in New Orleans, attended McDonogh 35 Senior High School, and graduated from Spelman College in 2007 with a bachelor's degree in Biology. At Spelman she was a RISE (Research Initiative for Science Enhancement) Scholar. She earned a master's degree in applied statistics in 2011, and a Doctorate in human genetics from Vanderbilt University in 2012. She was the first African-American to graduate from Vanderbilt University with a Ph.D. in Human Genetics. She had her postgraduate training at the Center for Human Genetic Research at Vanderbilt University, and also at the Icahn School of Medicine at Mount Sinai.

== Research and career ==
Jeff is a Senior Bioinformatics scientist at Illumina where she develops genomic pipelines used in population screening. Her academic research career has focused on population genetics, with an emphasis on admixed populations and genetic risk factors of common diseases.

=== Public engagement ===
==== In Those Genes Podcast ====
In Those Genes is a hip-hop inspired podcast. Jeff is the host and executive producer of the podcast, which explores genetics and "the lost identities of African descended Americans through the lens of Black Culture." The lead producer is Sam Ridell, creative director is Chris Diggins, the music and audio engineer is Chad Milner, sociologist is Saida Grundy, and the consultant is Stevan Smith.

In 2018, Jeff won the inaugural Spotify Sound Up Bootcamp which awarded her with $10,000 to start her podcast. Episode 3, "Skinfolk, Kinfolk," was listed by IndieWire] as one of the 50 Best Podcast Episodes of 2020. The episode "Dat Rona," featuring guest medical expert, Ashira Blazer, received the 2020 Radio Impact award in the Third Coast/ Richard H. Driehaus Foundation Competition.

In the podcast, Jeff uses genetics to decode and uncover the lost histories and futures of African-descended Americans. For example, in season 2 of the podcast, the episode "She Get It From Her Moma" explored the origin of long-held beliefs about inheritance within the Black community.

==== kinkofa Initiative ====
Jeff is partnered with kinkofa (KIN*koh*fah): go get yo' kin as a way for African Americans to discover their Black family history. The founders, Jourdan Brunson and Tameshia Rudd-Ridge, were inspired by the ancient Adinkra proverb 'sankofa' of the Akan people who reside in present-day Ghana and the Ivory Coast. The term sankofa encourages individuals to learn from their history and heritage in order to move forward.

kinkofa is a digital family history platform designed to African Americans and other peoples of African descent an opportunity to preserve their African history by uncovering, documenting, and preserving their unique origin stories. kinkofa is partnered with other public and private organizations to amplify stories that honor and enhance the public's understanding of African Americans' contributions to history.

kinkofa has other resources, such as the Rememory platform and the Black cemeteries app. Rememory is a free recording platform to manage all family stories in one place. The recordings could be in person or remote, and the historians available assist in helping spark meaningful conversations. Once a family story, trajectory, recipe, or more is recorded, it is saved in a cloud-based database for generations of family members to watch. The Black cemeteries app helps African Americans share historic burial grounds. Such burial grounds have been historically neglected, leaving descendants unable to locate the final resting places of their ancestors. Cemeteries provide essential genealogical information needed to trace family origins, and not preserving them poses a threat.

=== Awards and honors ===
- 2023 National Academies’ Eric and Wendy Schmidt Awards for Excellence in Science Communications. She was the top award winner.
- 2020 American Society of Human Genetics Advocacy Award for her podcast. She is both the first African American and the youngest recipient to receive this honor.
- 2020 Radio Impact award from the Third Coast / Richard H. Driehaus Foundation Competition
- 2018 Spotify Sound Up Bootcamp
- 2006 National Human Genome Research Institute Scholar

== Selected recent publications ==
  - Wenric, S., Jeff, J.M., Joseph, T. et al. Rapid response to the alpha-1 adrenergic agent phenylephrine in the perioperative period is impacted by genomics and ancestry. Pharmacogenomics J 21, 174–189 (2021). https://doi.org/10.1038/s41397-020-00194-5
  - Ken Wiley, Laura Findley, Madison Goldrich, Tejinder K Rakhra-Burris, Ana Stevens, Pamela Williams, Carol J Bult, Rex Chisholm, Patricia Deverka, Geoffrey S Ginsburg, Eric D Green, Gail Jarvik, George A Mensah, Erin Ramos, Mary V Relling, Dan M Roden, Robb Rowley, Gil Alterovitz, Samuel Aronson, Lisa Bastarache, James J Cimino, Erin L Crowgey, Guilherme Del Fiol, Robert R Freimuth, Mark A Hoffman, Janina Jeff, Kevin Johnson, Kensaku Kawamoto, Subha Madhavan, Eneida A Mendonca, Lucila Ohno-Machado, Siddharth Pratap, Casey Overby Taylor, Marylyn D Ritchie, Nephi Walton, Chunhua Weng, Teresa Zayas-Cabán, Teri A Manolio, Marc S Williams, A research agenda to support the development and implementation of genomics-based clinical informatics tools and resources, Journal of the American Medical Informatics Association, Volume 29, Issue 8, August 2022, Pages 1342–1349, https://doi.org/10.1093/jamia/ocac057
  - Pendergrass, Sarah A.; Buyske, Steven; Jeff, Janina M.; Frase, Alex; Dudek, Scott; Bradford, Yuki; Ambite, Jose-Luis; Avery, Christy L.; Buzkova, Petra; et al. (2019). "A phenome-wide association study (PheWAS) in the Population Architecture using Genomics and Epidemiology (PAGE) study reveals potential pleiotropy in African Americans". PLOS ONE. 14 (12) e0226771. Bibcode:2019PLoSO..1426771P. doi:10.1371/journal.pone.0226771. PMC 6938343. PMID 31891604.
  - Wojcik, Genevieve L.; Graff, Mariaelisa; Nishimura, Katherine K.; Tao, Ran; Haessler, Jeffrey; Gignoux, Christopher R.; Highland, Heather M.; Patel, Yesha M.; Sorokin, Elena P.; Avery, Christy L.; Belbin, Gillian M.; Bien, Stephanie A.; Cheng, Iona; Cullina, Sinead; Hodonsky, Chani J.; Hu, Yao; Huckins, Laura M.; Jeff, Janina; et al. (2019). "Genetic analyses of diverse populations improves discovery for complex traits". Nature. 570 (7762): 514–518. doi:10.1038/s41586-019-1310-4. PMC 6785182. PMID 31217584.
  - Edwards, Todd L.; Giri, Ayush; Hellwege, Jacklyn N.; Hartmann, Katherine E.; Stewart, Elizabeth A.; Jeff, Janina M.; Bray, Michael J.; et al. (2019). "A Trans-Ethnic Genome-Wide Association Study of Uterine Fibroids". Frontiers in Genetics. 10 511. doi:10.3389/fgene.2019.00511. PMC 6582231. PMID 31249589.

== Most cited publications ==
- Locke AE, Kahali B, Berndt SI, Justice AE, Pers TH, Day FR, Powell C, Vedantam S, Buchkovich ML, Yang J, Croteau-Chonka DC. Genetic studies of body mass index yield new insights for obesity biology. Nature. 2015 Feb;518(7538):197-206. According to Google Scholar, this article has been cited 2914 times
- Wood AR, Esko T, Yang J, Vedantam S, Pers TH, Gustafsson S, Chu AY, Estrada K, Kutalik Z, Amin N, Buchkovich ML. Defining the role of common variation in the genomic and biological architecture of adult human height. Nature genetics. 2014 Nov;46(11):1173-86. According to Google Scholar, it has been cited 1566 times.
- Wojcik GL, Graff M, Nishimura KK, Tao R, Haessler J, Gignoux CR, Highland HM, Patel YM, Sorokin EP, Avery CL, Belbin GM. Genetic analyses of diverse populations improves discovery for complex traits. Nature. 2019 Jun;570(7762):514-8. According to Google Scholar, it has been cited 186 times.
