= Roger Donald Dickerson =

New Orleans pianist and composer (born 1934)

Roger Donald Dickerson (born August 24, 1934) is a New Orleans pianist, composer, and educator.

== Biography ==
Coming from a musical family, Dickerson began piano lessons at 8 years old. In elementary school he played the French horn, baritone and tuba. His experience playing brass instruments continued in college where he played trombone. From a young age, Dickerson was interested in, and influenced by the music of the French Quarter. At 15 Dickerson played in a popular music band called Roger Dickerson and his Groovy Boys, which played high schools and community centers in his neighborhood; showing the influence of current New Orleans musical culture. Wallace Davenport, a jazz trumpeter, versed in styes ranging from traditional jazz to bebop, was Dickerson's uncle. From Wallace, Dickerson got his first introductions to harmony, counterpoint and orchestration.

Dickerson graduated from McDonough No. 35 High School. After high school, Dickerson studied music at Dillard University earning his Bachelor of Music in 1955, then a master's degree in music from Indiana University School of Music in 1957 where he studied with Bernhard Heiden.

After finishing his master's degree, Dickerson joined the United States Army, where he became a specialist 4th class. While in the Army, he played in service bands around Europe, including the 33rd Army Band in Heidelberg, Germany. After two years in the Army, Dickerson was able to travel to Vienna on a Fulbright Scholarship, where he studied music with Karl Schiske and Alfred Uhl. In 1965 he was elected to the American Society of Composers, Authors and Publishers. Dickerson has received notable commissions, including a series of concert pieces commissioned by the Rockefeller Foundation in 1972, and his New Orleans Concerto, commissioned in 1976 by the New Orlean's Centennial Commission. This concerto serves as the focal point of the 1977 PBS documentary New Orleans Concerto.

Dickerson is a professor emeritus at Southern University of New Orleans (SUNO). There he was the choir director and music coordinator. Along with elements of New Orleans culture, Dickerson's work shows the influence of jazz and blues.

== Work list ==
=== Orchestral ===
- Concert Overture (1957)
- Essay, band (1958)
- Fugue 'n' Blues, jazz orchestra (1959)
- A Musical Service for Louis (1972)
- Orpheus an' His Slide Trombone (J. Greenberg), 1974–1975)
- New Orleans Concerto, for piano & orchestra (1976)

=== Vocal ===
- Fair Dillard (J. N. Barnum), SATB (1955)
- Music I Heard (C. Aiken), for soprano & piano (1956)
- The Negro Speaks of Rivers (L. Hughes), for soprano & piano (1961)
- Ps xlix, SATB, timpani (1979)
- African-American Celebration (Dickerson), SATB (1984)
- Beyond Silence (Dickerson), for soprano, baritone, 3 trumpets, 3 trombones, timpani & organ (1986)

=== Chamber and solo instrumental ===
- Prekussion, percussion ensemble (1954)
- Music for Brass, 2 trumpets, trombone (1955)
- Woodwind Trio (1955)
- Das neugeborne Kindelein, chorale prelude, organ (1956)
- Sonatina, piano (1956)
- String Quartet (1956)
- Music for String Trio (1957)
- Scene, horn, string quartet (1959)
- Movement, trumpet, piano (1960)
- Sonata, clarinet, piano (1960)
- Wind Quintet (1961)
- Concert Pieces for Beginning String Players (1972)
- Expressions, violin, piano (1983)
- Incantation, violin, piano (1983)
- Fanfare, 2 trumpets, timpani (1991)
