= Samuel Jarvis Peters =

Louisiana banker and merchant

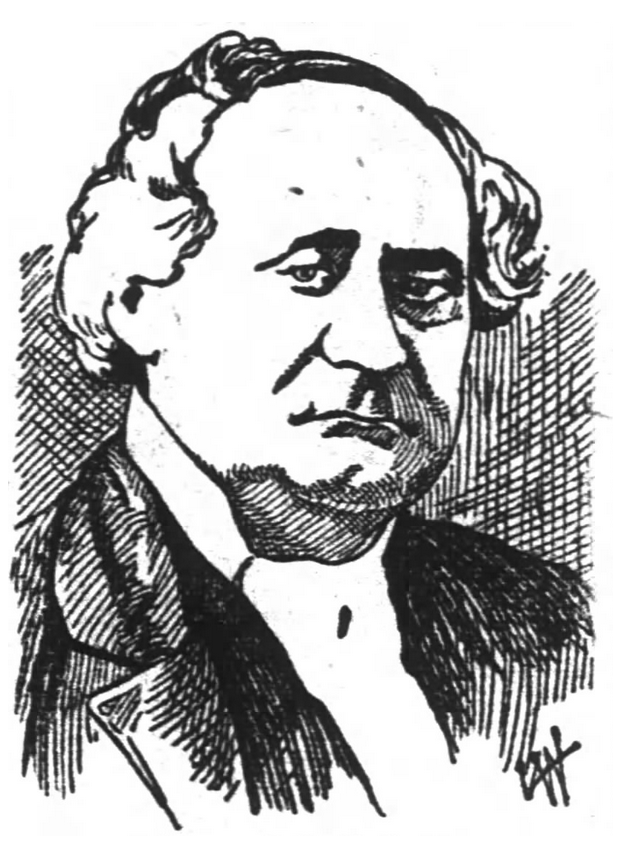
Sketch of Samuel Jarvis Peters by an unknown artist

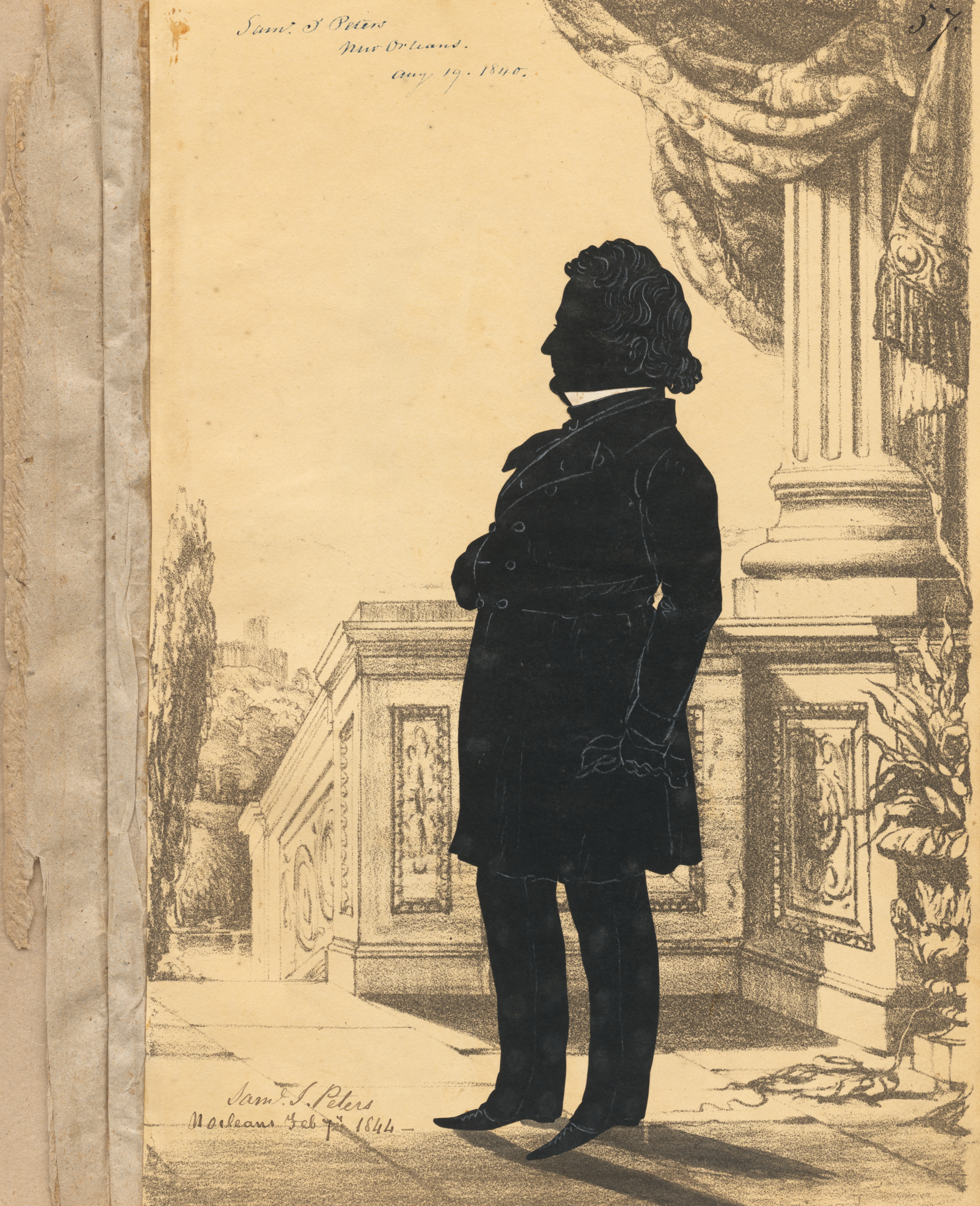
Silhouette of Samuel Jarvis Peters by Auguste Edouart

Samuel Jarvis Peters (July 1801 – 11 August 1855) was an American businessman and education activist. He is notable for his support of public education in New Orleans. The Times-Democrat described him as the "Father of New Orleans Public Schools".

Peters arrived in New Orleans in 1821, and made his fortune in groceries. He later became the president of the New Orleans Chamber of Commerce.

A public school was named for him in 1897. The school was later renamed as Commercial High School, and subsequently for Israel Meyer Augustine, Jr. The school was closed in 2005.
