= Auguste Edouart =

French-American painter

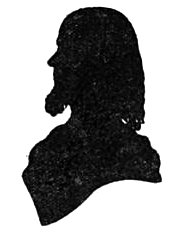
Portrait of August Edouart, 19th century

Auguste Amant Constant Fidèle Edouart (1789–1861) was a French-born portrait artist who worked in England, Scotland and the United States in the 19th century. He specialised in silhouette portraits.

== Biography ==
Born in Dunkerque, he left France in 1814, and established himself in London, where he began his career making portraits from hair. In 1825, he began work as a silhouette portraitist, taking full-length likenesses in profile by cutting out black paper with scissors. Edouart spent fifteen years touring England and in 1829 arrived in Edinburgh. He remained there for three years, during which time he produced some 5,000 likenesses. Edouart travelled in the United States in about 1839–49, visiting New York, Boston and other locales.

He later returned to France, where he worked on smaller silhouettes. They included one of the most notable writers of this period, Victor Hugo.

== Portraits ==
Edouart created portraits of hundreds of subjects, including:

- Samuel Appleton and family
- Fanny Brawne
- Captain Edward Bolton
- William Buckland, Frank Buckland
- Charles Burroughs
- Henry Clay
- John Connell and family
- Susan Edmonstone Ferrier
- Samuel Freeman
- Samuel Griswold Goodrich
- Sarah Josepha Hale
- Thaddeus Mason Harris
- Josiah Harlan
- Robert Knox
- Francis Lieber
- Liston, comedian
- Henry Wadsworth Longfellow
- John Loudoun McAdam
- John Moss (see American Collector Magazine September 1943)
- Stephen Olin
- Theophilus Parsons
- Samuel Jarvis Peters
- Walter Scott
- Daniel Webster

== Image gallery ==
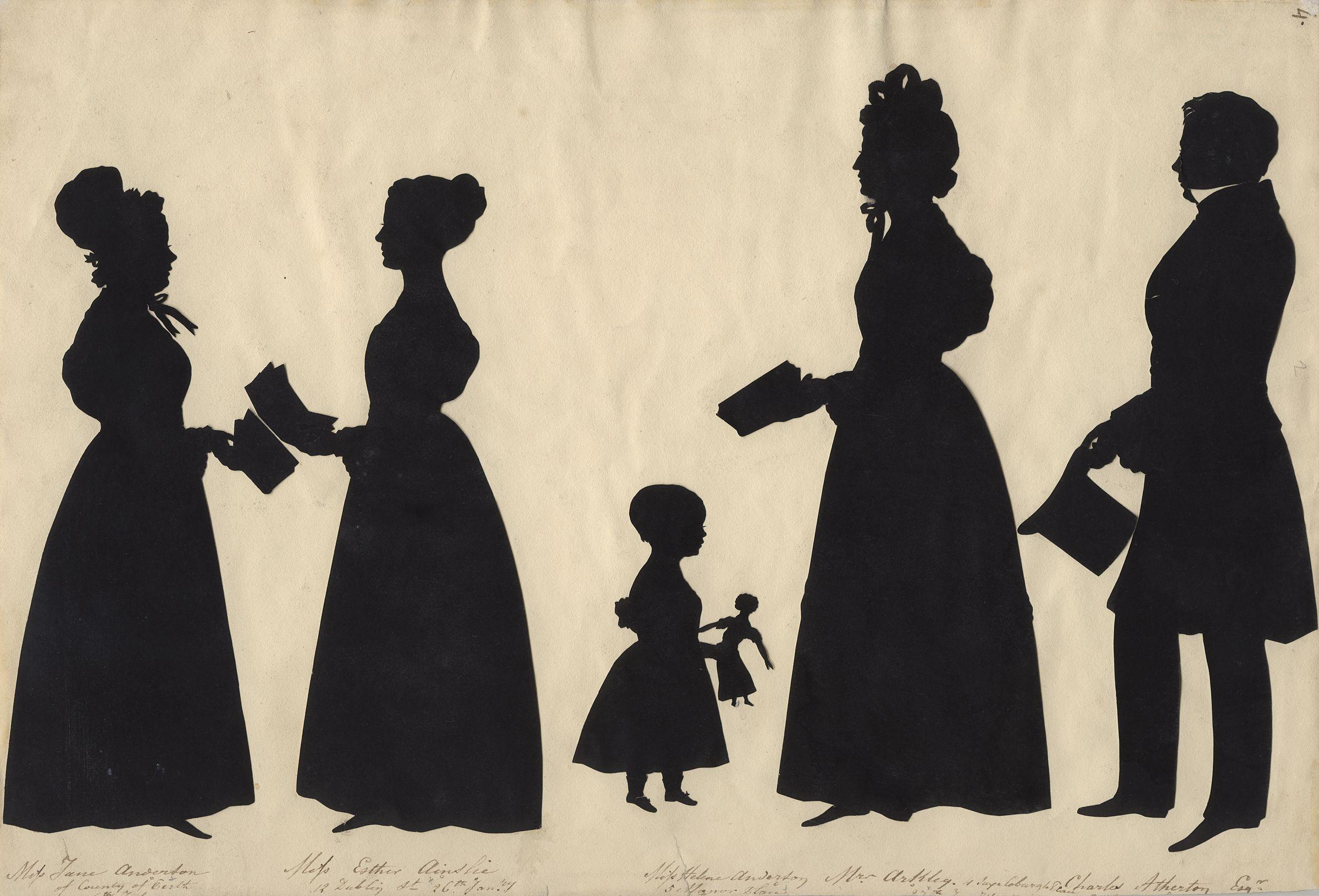
Jane Anderson; Esther Ainslie; Helena Anderson; Mrs Arkley; Charles Atherton (National Portrait Gallery, London)

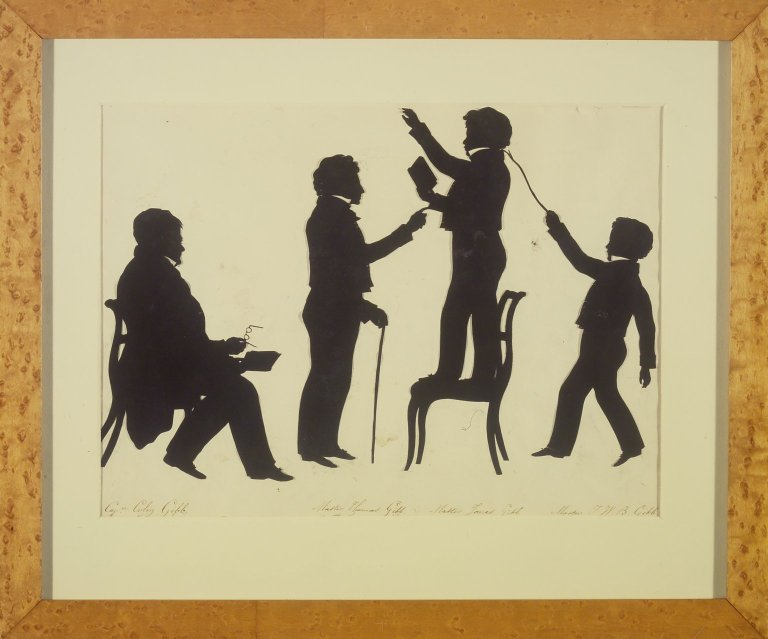
Cut Silhouette of Four Full Figures, 19th century (Brooklyn Museum)

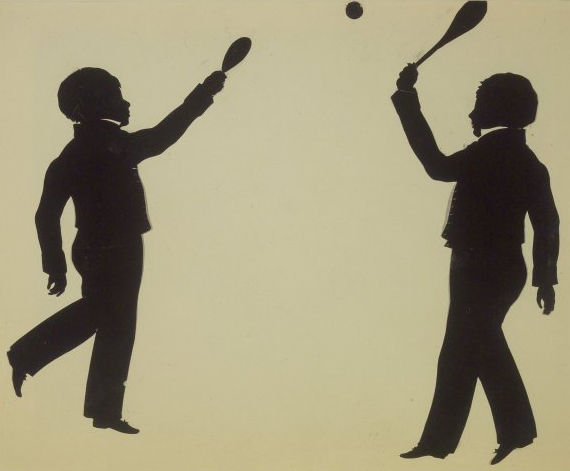
Colin Gibb and Charles Gibb, 19th century (Brooklyn Museum)

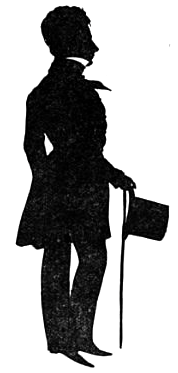
H.W. Longfellow, 19th century

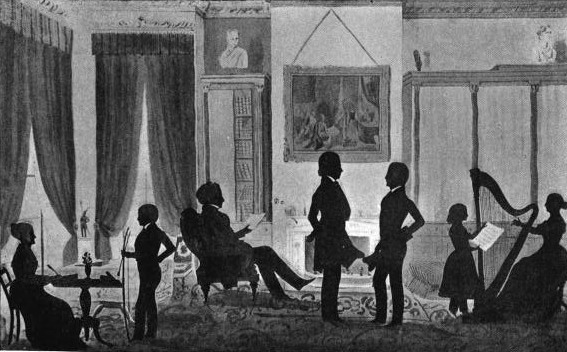
Abbott Lawrence and family, no.5 Park St., Boston, 19th century

== Collections ==
Works by Edouart reside in the collections of the National Portrait Gallery, London; National Galleries of Scotland; Crawford Art Gallery, Cork; New York Historical Society; Smithsonian National Portrait Gallery; the Museum of Fine Arts, Boston; Historic New England; and the American Jewish Historical Society, New York.

== Exhibitions ==
The Art of the Silhouette in 19th-century Cork, which included works by Edouart, Stephen O’Driscoll (c.1825-1895), and miniature portraits of members of the Crawford Family, was held at Crawford Art Gallery, Cork in 2015.

"Black Out: Silhouettes Then and Now", which included works by Edouart, Moses Williams, and others, held at the National Portrait Gallery, Washington D.C. May 31, 2018 to March 10, 2019, and the Birmingham Museum of Art, Birmingham AL, September 28, 2019 to January 12, 2020.
