= Tradeston Bridge =

Pedestrian bridge across Glasgow's River Clyde

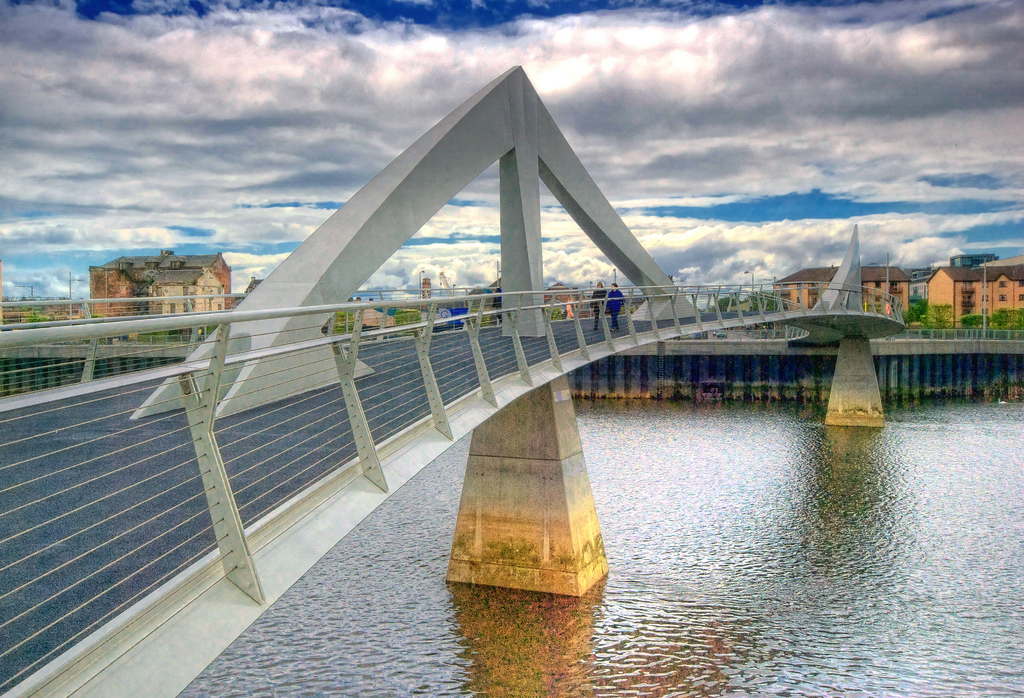
- The bridge viewed from the south
- Coordinates: 55°51′21″N 4°15′50″W
- Carries: 756
- Crosses: River Clyde
- Locale: Glasgow
- Other name: Squiggly Bridge
- Named for: Tradeston
- Owner: Glasgow City Council
- Maintained by: Glasgow City Council

Characteristics
- Design: Cantilever

History
- Designer: Dissing+Weitling
- Construction start: 2007
- Construction end: 2008
- Construction cost: £7 million
- Opened: 14 May 2009

Location
- Interactive map of Tradeston Bridge

The Tradeston Bridge, also known locally as the Squiggly Bridge, is a pedestrian bridge across the River Clyde in Glasgow, Scotland which opened on 14 May 2009. It links the districts of Anderston on the north bank of the Clyde to Tradeston and Kingston on the south bank. The aim of constructing the bridge was to aid the regeneration of Tradeston, by giving it a direct link to the city's financial district on the western side of the city centre.

The design was prepared by Dissing+Weitling, a Danish architectural firm, with the English engineers Halcrow Group. The bridge concrete works were built by BAM Nuttall whilst the steel bridge structure was fabricated and erected by RBG Ltd. The structure is a balanced cantilever design. The steel fins, which provide structural support, are placed above the bridge to add visual interest but also to reduce the overall bulk of the deck.

It cost £7 million to construct and is used by pedestrians and cyclists, with motorised traffic prohibited. The span is horizontally curved in an S shape with outward canting on both curves. The S shape provides the bridge with the extra length it needs to allow enough clearance for boats to pass under, without making the bridge too steep.

== See also ==
- List of bridges in Scotland

Next bridge upstream	River Clyde	Next bridge downstream
George V Bridge	Tradeston Bridge	Kingston Bridge
