= George V Bridge, Glasgow =

Bridge in Glasgow, Scotland

George V Bridge
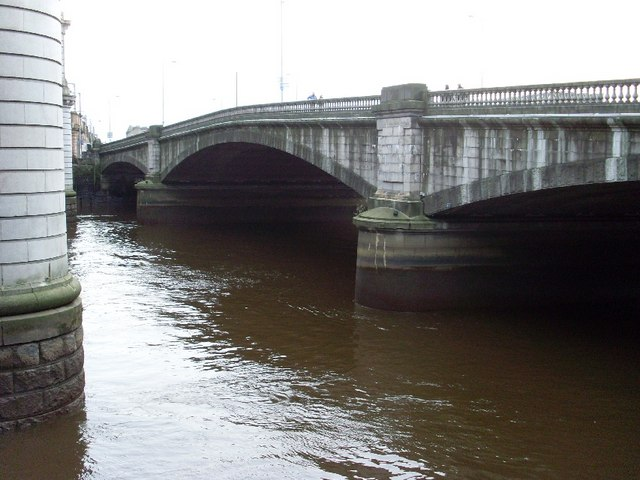
- Bridge across the River Clyde
- Coordinates: 55.8557°N 4.2598°W
- OS grid reference: NS 58648 64874
- Carries: A77
- Crosses: River Clyde
- Locale: Glasgow
- Named for: King George V
- Preceded by: Caledonian Railway Bridge
- Followed by: Tradeston Bridge

Characteristics
- Design: Box girder
- Material: Reinforced concrete
- No. of spans: 3

History
- Opened: 1928

Listed Building – Category B
- Official name: King George V Bridge Over River Clyde, From Oswald Street To Commerce Street
- Designated: 21 March 1977
- Reference no.: LB33081

Location
- Interactive map of George V Bridge

George V Bridge (sometimes referred to as King George V Bridge) is a three-arched road bridge over the River Clyde in the city centre of Glasgow, Scotland, named after King George V.

The bridge was designed by Glasgow City Engineer Thomas Somers and built by Melville Dundas & Whitson. It links the southside Tradeston area to Oswald Street in the city Centre. The bridge was commissioned in 1914, but was delayed due to the First World War: the bridge was not completed and opened until 1928. It is now protected as a category B listed building.

Despite its appearance as a masonry bridge, the bridge is actually built of reinforced concrete box girders, faced with Dalbeattie granite.

== See also ==
- List of bridges in Scotland

Next crossing upstream	River Clyde	Next crossing downstream
Caledonian Railway Bridge	George V Bridge; Grid reference NS5864864874	Tradeston Bridge
