= Broomielaw =

Street in Glasgow, Scotland

Coordinates: 55.85677°N 4.26241°W

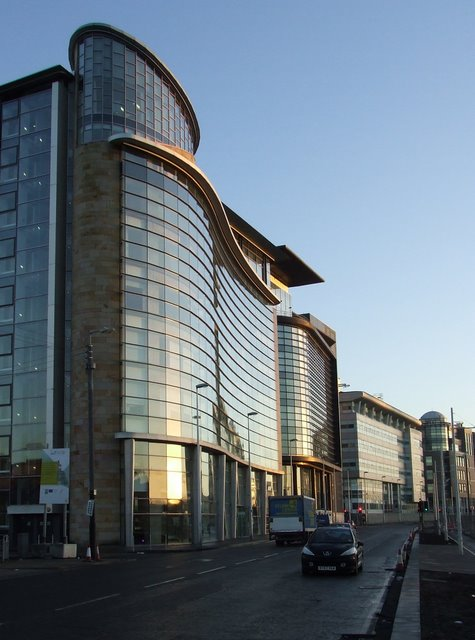
View along the Broomielaw, the buildings on the left are part of the IFSD

The Broomielaw is a major thoroughfare in the city of Glasgow, Scotland. It runs beside the River Clyde, on its north bank looking over to Tradeston. Both sides have been marketed as the city's International Financial Services District (IFSD).

== History ==
Originally part of the Lands of Blythswood, and named after Brumelaw Croft, because broom grew along the waterfront, the riverside street runs from Jamaica Bridge towards Anderston Quay, under the Kingston Bridge towards Finnieston Quay.

Glasgow had the freedom of navigation of the River Clyde to the sea some twenty-seven miles westwards, confirmed later by Royal Charter signed by King James VI in 1611. The city's first quay was built at Brumelaw in 1688. From the early 1800s and increasingly after the invention of sea-going steamships in 1812 in Glasgow, the Broomielaw was a major part of Glasgow's harbour with shipping lines to all parts of the world, and an inventive and growing shipbuilding industry, becoming the wealthiest and largest in the world.

During the nineteenth and first half of the twentieth centuries, Paddle steamers, followed by turbine steamers, ran from here to the coast for day trips to the seaside and for some business people to commute.

The Broomielaw is also where the ferry known as 'the Derry Boat' docked, from the start of the service in 1813 until the closure of that service in 1966. This ferry service provided a direct shipping link between Glasgow and Derry, a port city in the north-west of Ireland, and it sailed in both directions several times per week. Tens of thousands of people from across the west of Ulster, the vast majority from County Donegal and the west of County Tyrone, emigrated to Scotland, in particular to Glasgow, by travelling on 'the Derry Boat', from the early nineteenth century up until the 1960s. Usually known as 'the Derry Boat', regardless of what direction it was sailing in, or 'the Scotch Boat', it would sail from the quayside in the centre of Derry, up Lough Foyle, on across to the west of Scotland, then up the Firth of Clyde, eventually docking at the quayside at the Broomielaw, right in the centre of Glasgow; the ferry would then make the return journey, back to Derry.

The Broomielaw is renowned in the pipe band tune 'Wha' saw the 42nd'. And in Kenneth McKellar's famed song 'The Song of the Clyde'. The area is also mentioned in some versions of the sea shanty "Donkey Riding":

Was you ever on the Broomielaw
Where the Yanks are all the go
And the boys dance heel-and-toe
Riding on a donkey

The Broomielaw also features in the "Freedom Come-All-Ye" a popular anti-Imperialist song of the 1960s by Hamish Henderson in the Scots language. The song refers to the role the quay played as a point of departure for the depopulation of Scotland through emigration.

Nae mair will our bonnie callants
Merch tae war whan our braggarts crousely craw
Nor wee weans frae pitheid an clachan
Murn the ships sailin doun the Broomielaw
