= Israel Meyer Augustine Jr. =

American judge

Israel Meyer Augustine Jr. (November 16, 1924 – August 29, 1994) was an American lawyer and the first Black district judge in Louisiana.

In 1971, he presided over a trial of twelve Black Panthers members accused of the attempted murder of five New Orleans policemen.

Augustine died of amyotrophic lateral sclerosis in 1994, aged 69. He was a Catholic.

Israel Meyer Augustine Middle School was renamed for him.
