= Burness Paull =

- Company type: Private
- Founded: 2012; 14 years ago
- Headquarters: Edinburgh, Scotland, UK
- Area served: United Kingdom
- Services: Legal advice
- Revenue: £83.2 million (2022–23).
- Number of employees: 670
- Website: www.burnesspaull.com

Burness Paull LLP is an independent law firm based in Scotland, advising clients across the UK and internationally. It specialises in corporate law, real estate, banking, funds, dispute resolution, employment and energy.

== Overview ==
The firm employs more than 670 people across its offices in Edinburgh, Glasgow and Aberdeen.

Burness Paull was established as a result of the merger between Burness and Paull & Williamsons in 2012. The combined turnover of the two firms at the time of the merger was £37 million.

In its results for the 2022–23 financial year, Burness Paull reported turnover of £83.2 million and profit of £35.5 million, making it one of the largest law firms in Scotland.

== Leadership ==
The firm is led by Mark Ellis, managing partner, and Peter Lawson, chair. Both trained at the firm and Lawson was elected to his leadership position in 2018, while Ellis was more recently appointed in 2024.

== Acquisition of McGill and Co ==
In 2021, Burness Paull acquired McGill & Co., a Scottish law firm specialising in immigration. As part of the move, McGill & Co. founder Grace McGill was named head of the Burness Paull immigration department, which also integrated other members of the McGill & Co. team.
