= Dewar, Scottish Borders =

Village in Scottish Borders, Scotland

Coordinates: 55.728355°N 3.03888963°W

Dewar
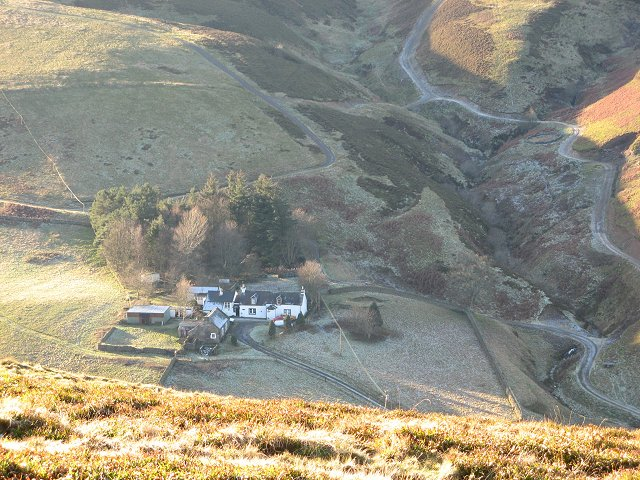
- Dewar from Dewar Hill

- Location within the Scottish Borders
- Council area: Scottish Borders
- Country: Scotland
- Sovereign state: United Kingdom
- Police: Scotland
- Fire: Scottish
- Ambulance: Scottish
- UK Parliament: Berwickshire, Roxburgh and Selkirk
- Scottish Parliament: Midlothian South, Tweeddale and Lauderdale

Dewar is a fermtoun by the Dewar Burn and Peatrig Hill, in the Scottish Borders area of Scotland.

Places nearby include Allanshaugh, Borthwick Hall, Fountainhall, Garvald, Gladhouse Reservoir, Heriot, the Heriot Water, the Leithen Water, Lugate and the Lugate Water.

== See also ==
- Clan Dewar
- List of places in the Scottish Borders
- List of places in Scotland
