= List of places in the Scottish Borders =

Map of places in the Scottish Borders compiled from this list
See the list of places in Scotland for places in other counties.

This list of places in the Scottish Borders includes towns, villages, hamlets, castles, golf courses, historic houses, hillforts, lighthouses, nature reserves, reservoirs, rivers, and other places of interest in the Scottish Borders council area of Scotland.

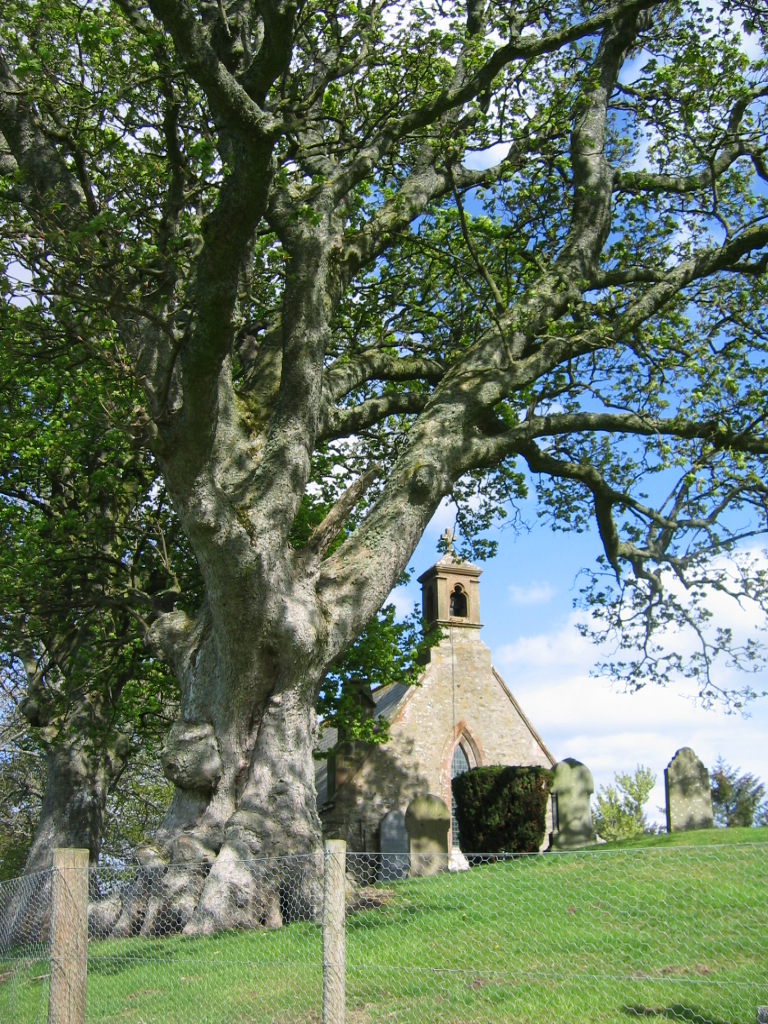
The Kirk at Lyne

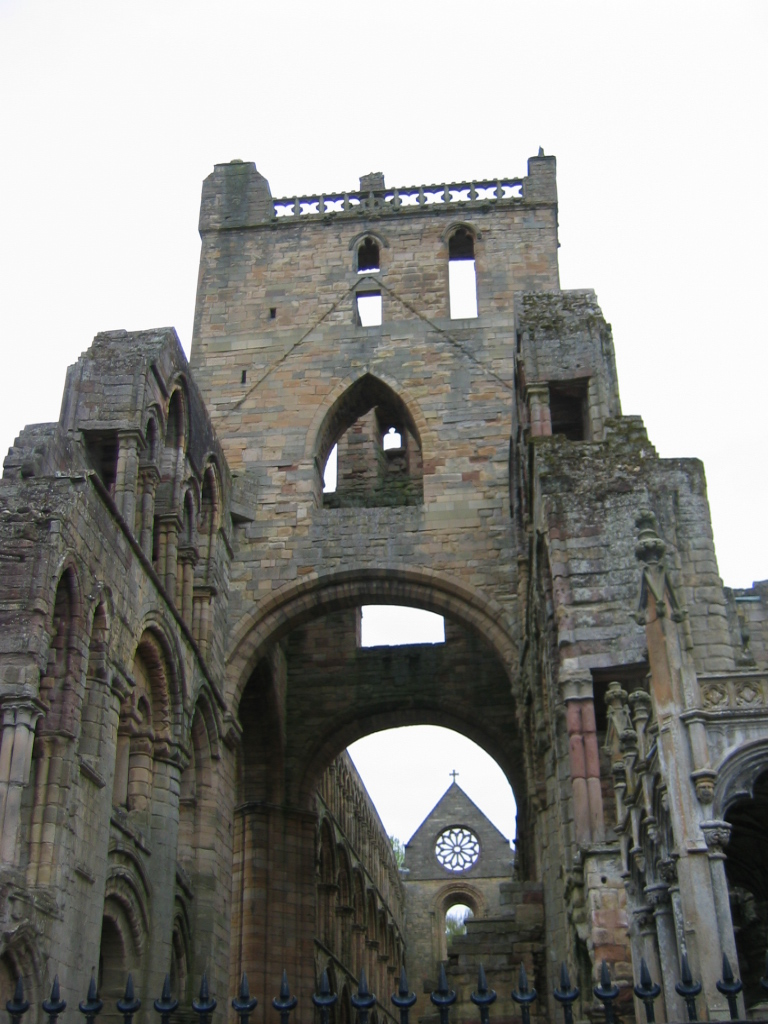
Jedburgh Abbey

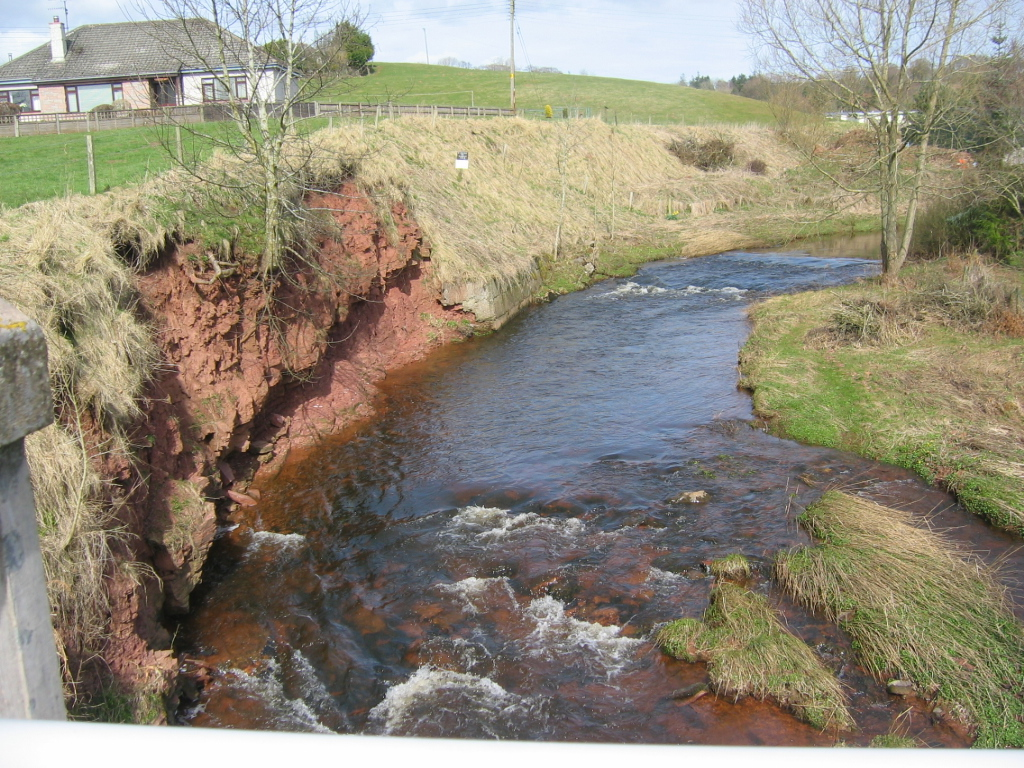
River Blackadder

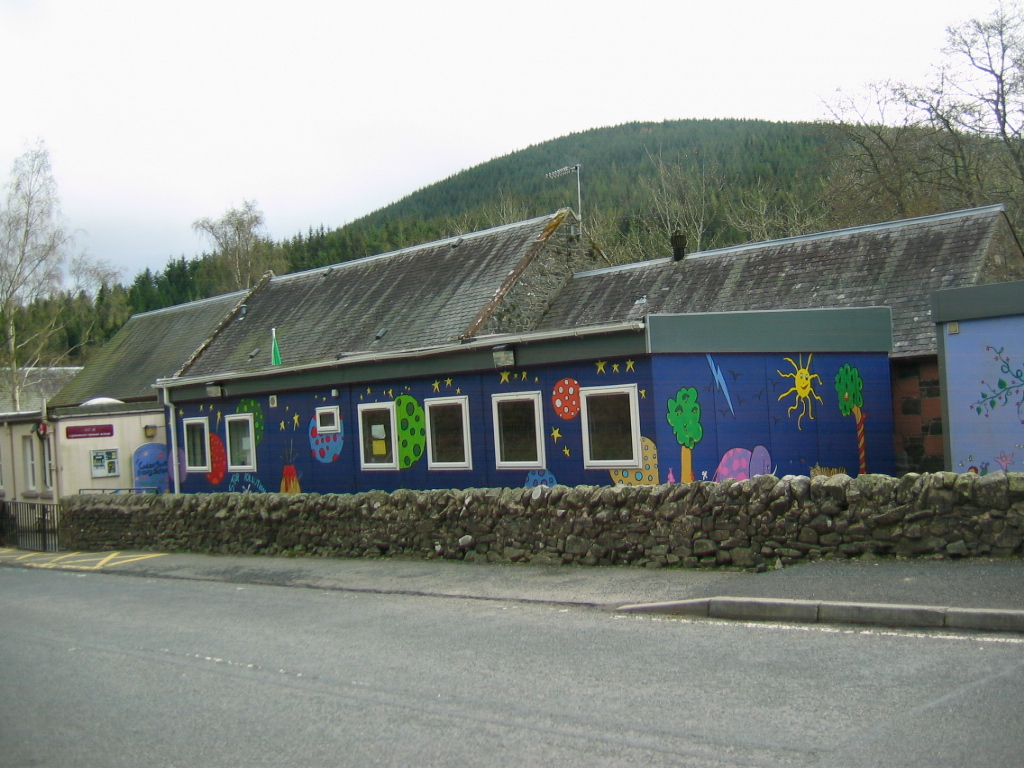
Primary school, Caddonfoot

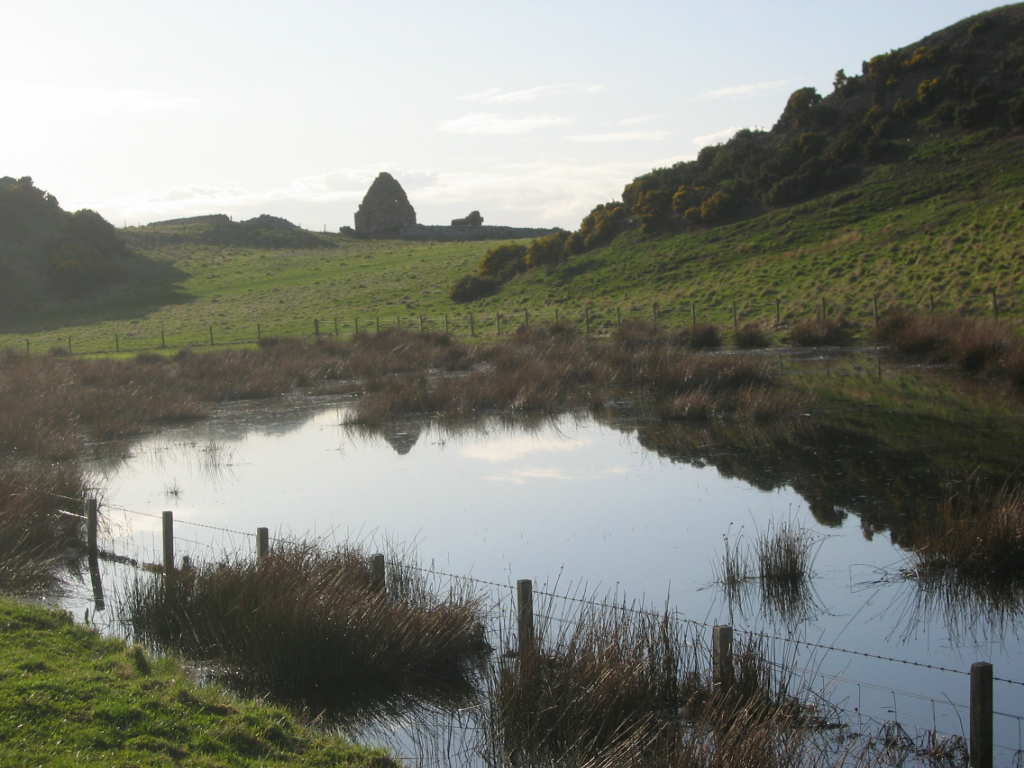
Pease Wood Nature Reserve

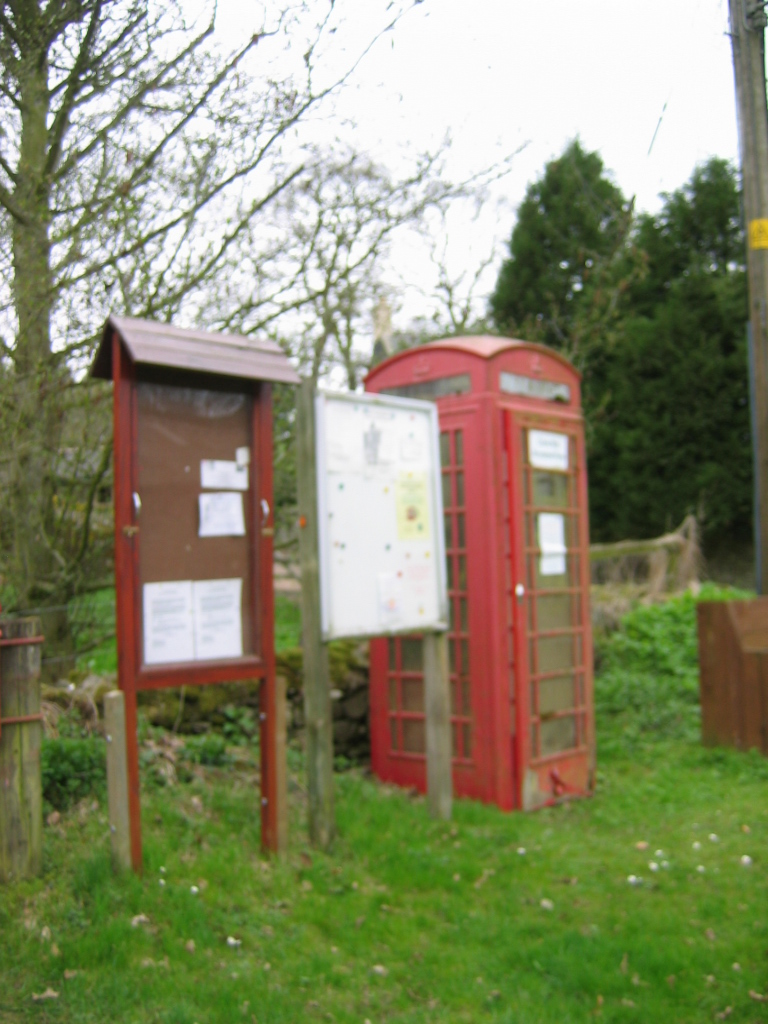
Abbey St. Bathans

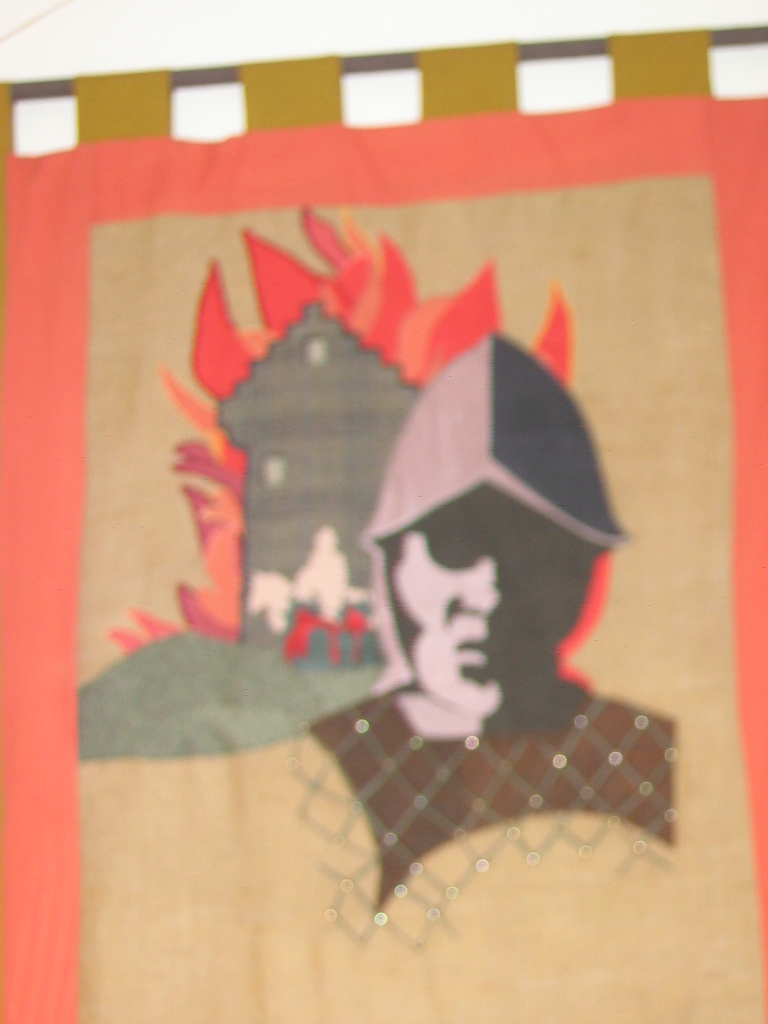
Image of Border Reivers

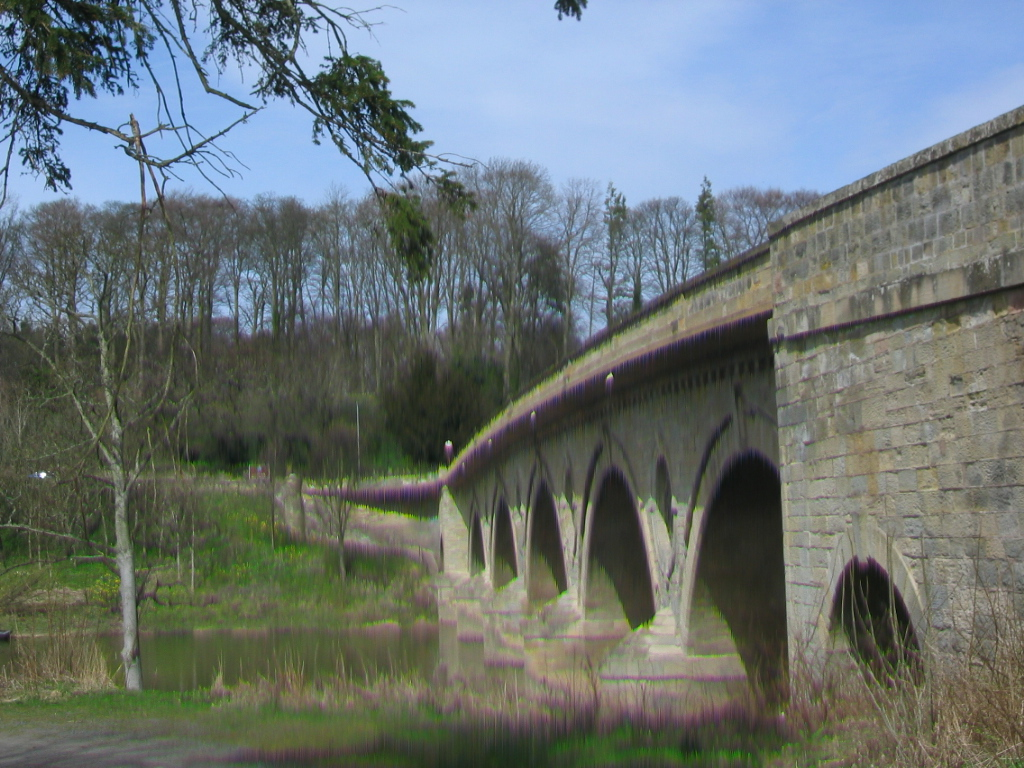
The River Tweed at Coldstream

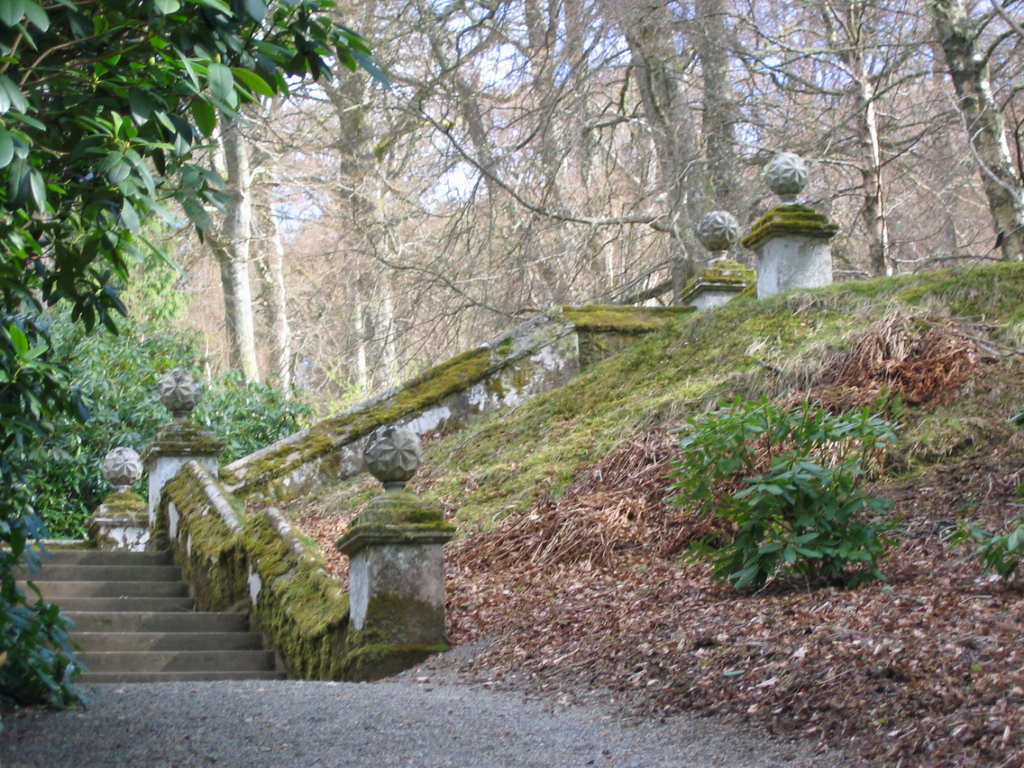
Dawyck Botanic Garden

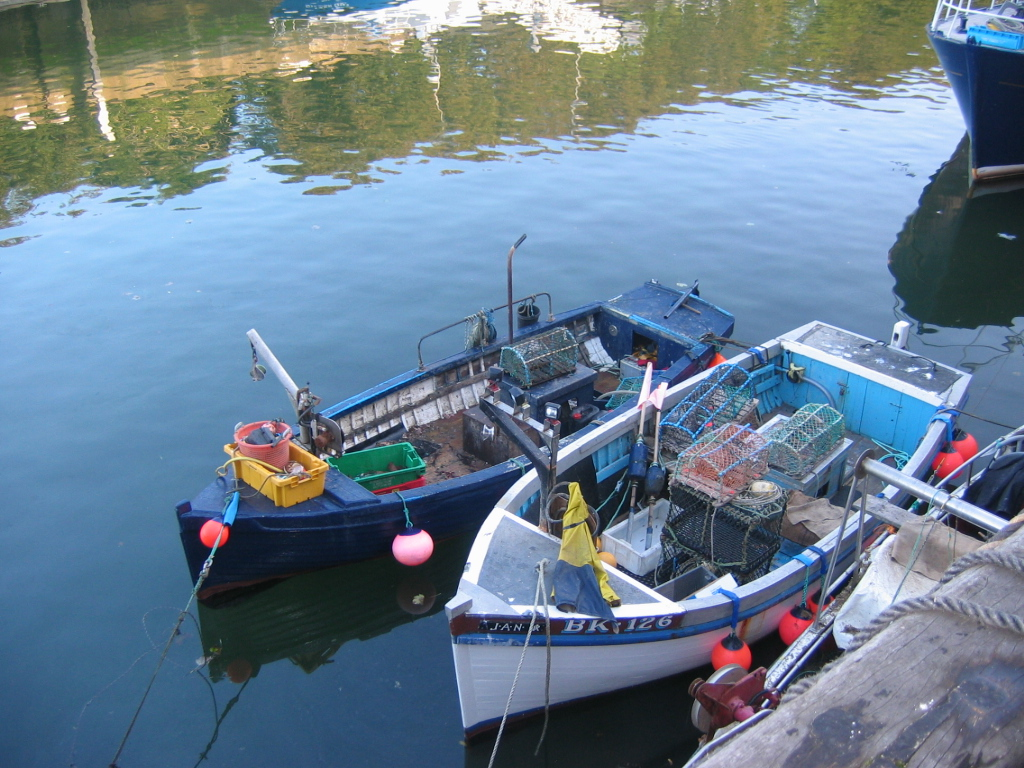
Boats in Eyemouth Harbour

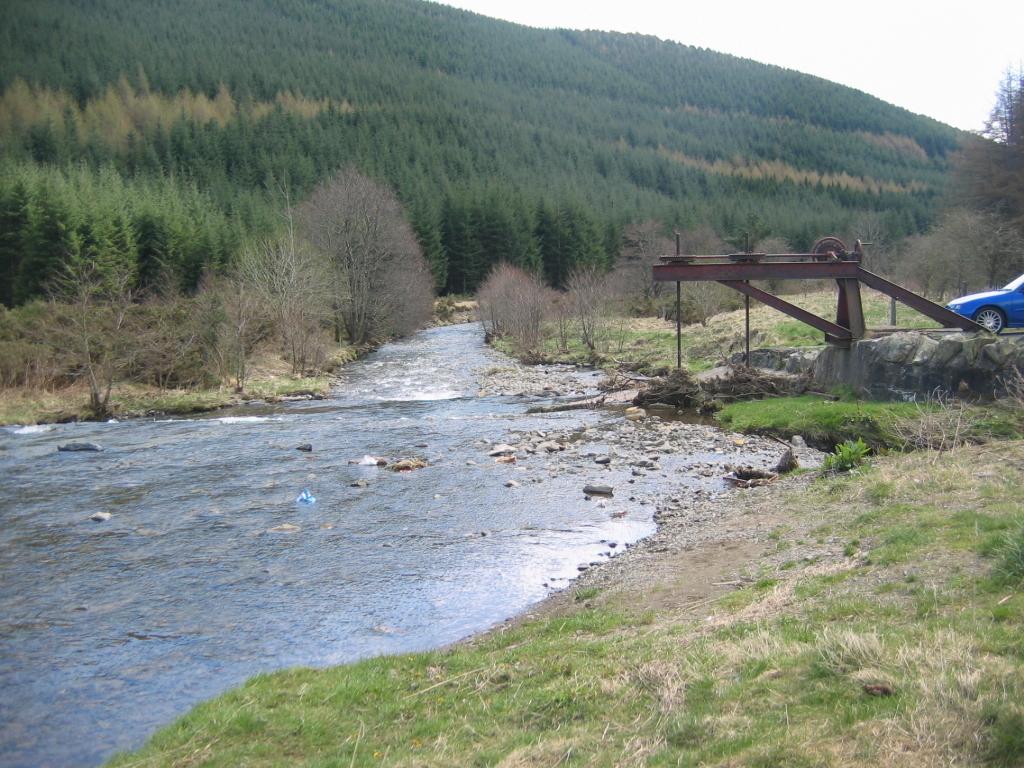
Leithen Water

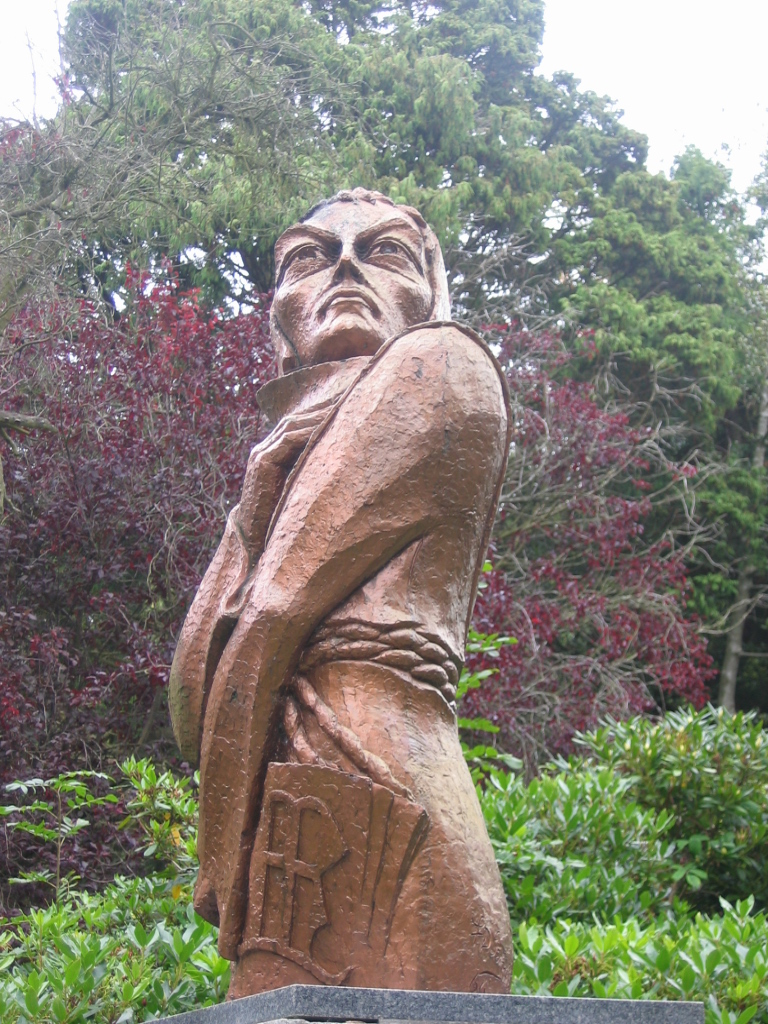
Sculpture of John Duns Scotus

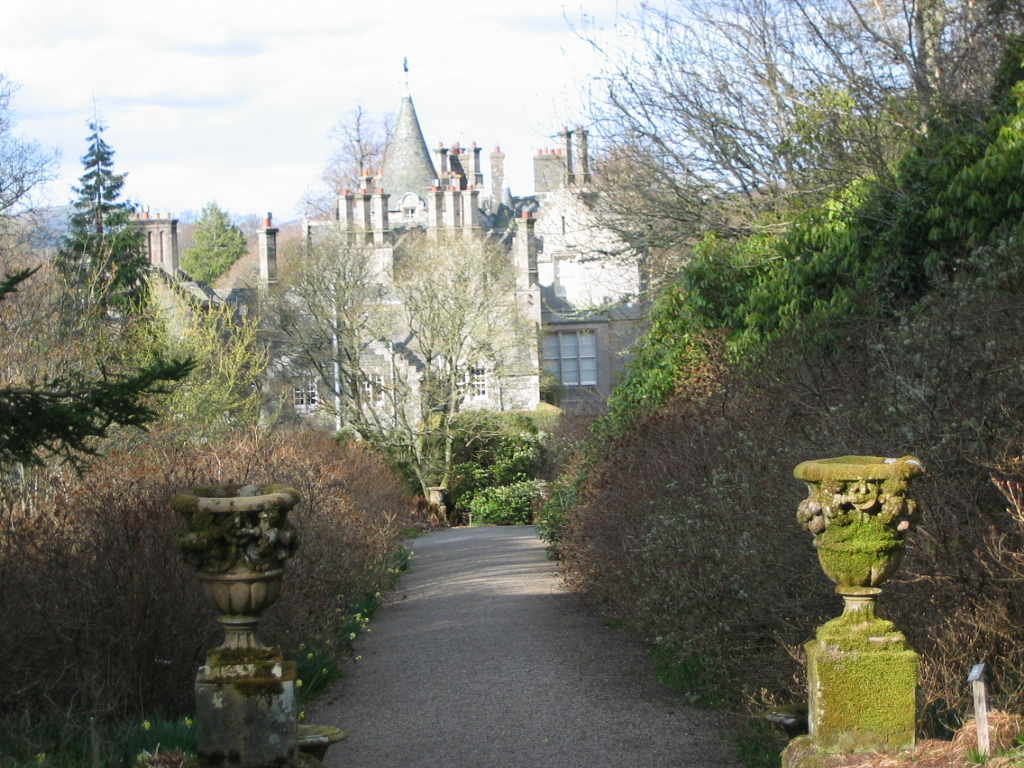
Dawyck House

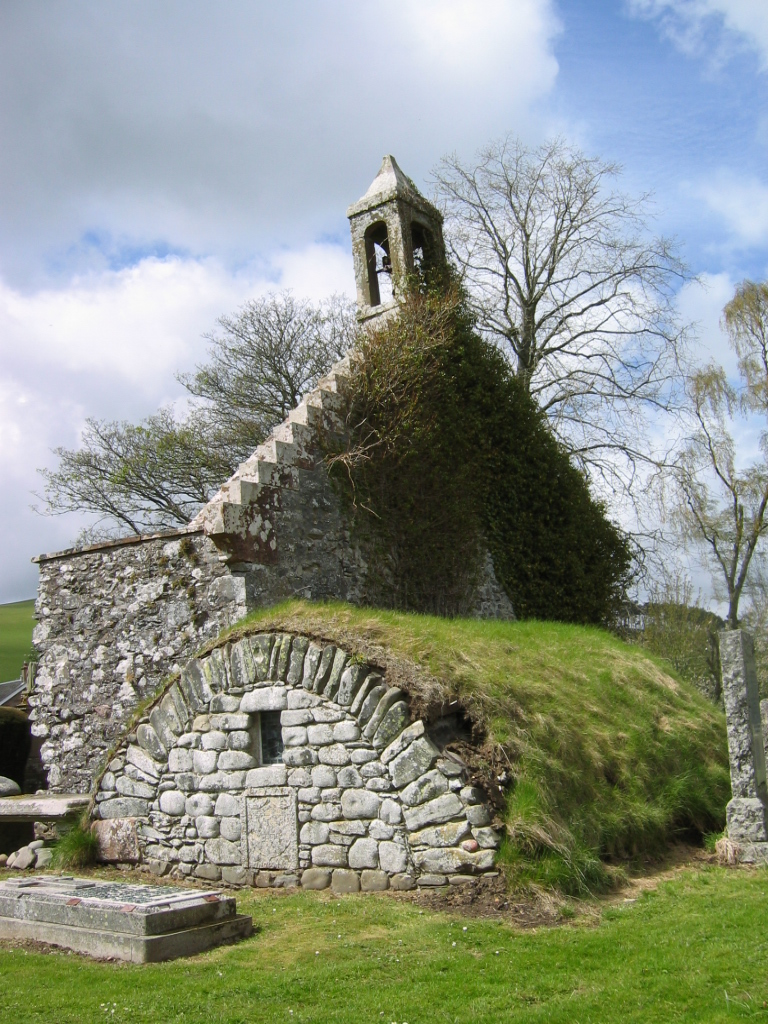
Broughton Kirk

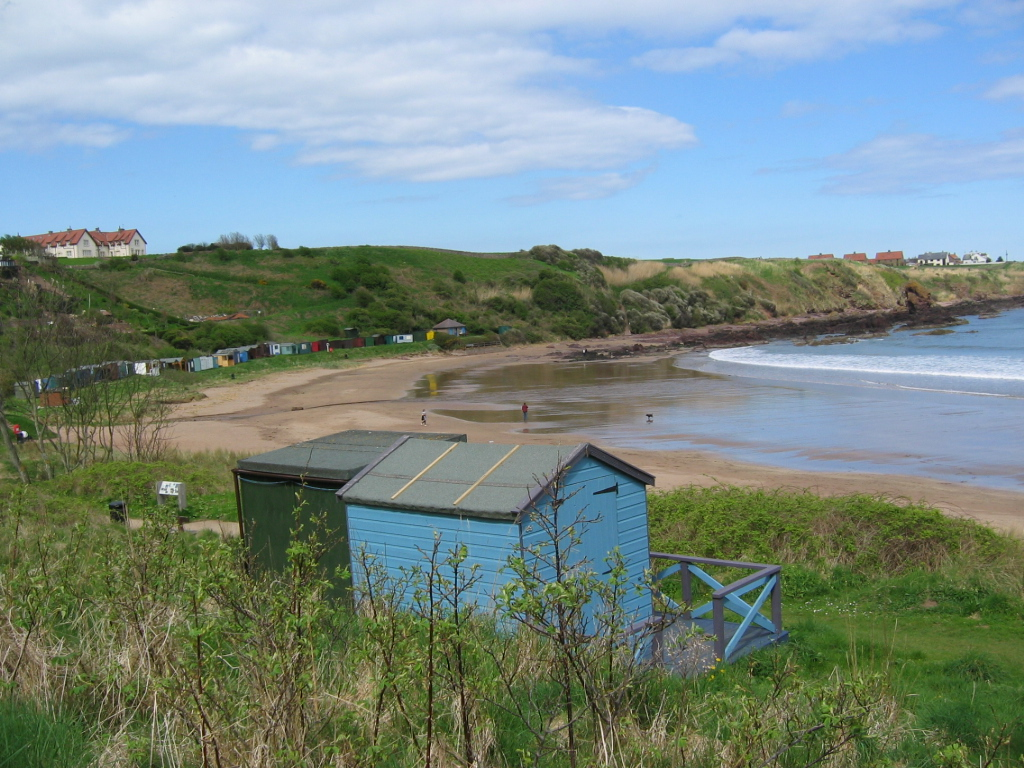
Beach huts at Coldingham

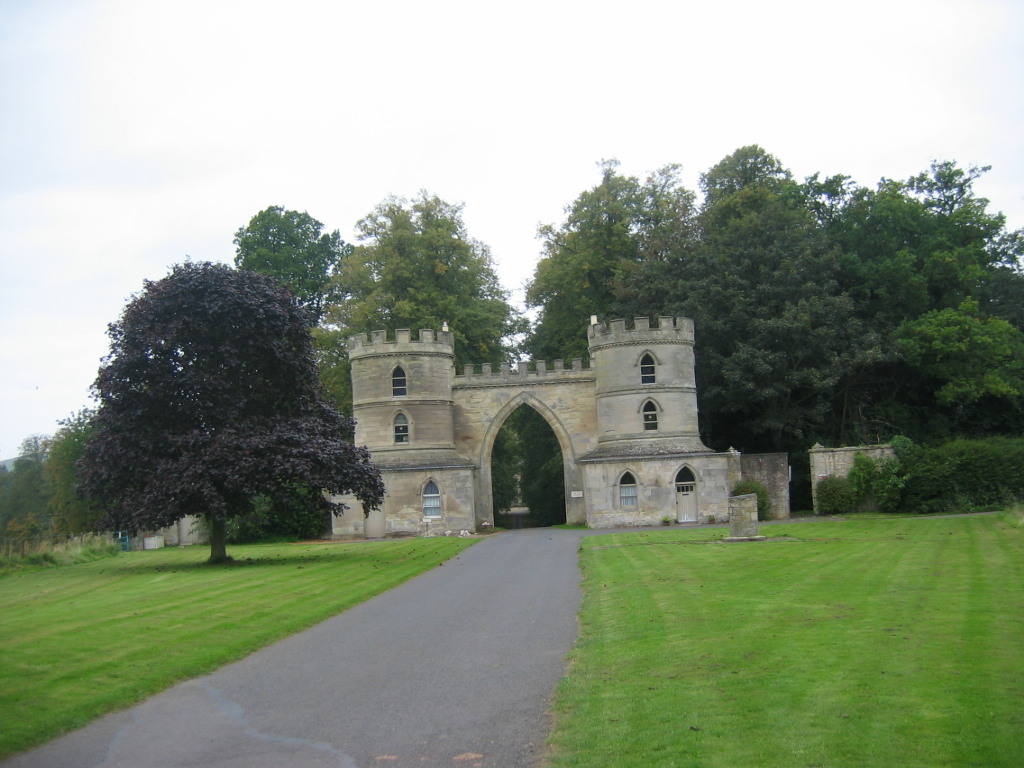
Duns Castle

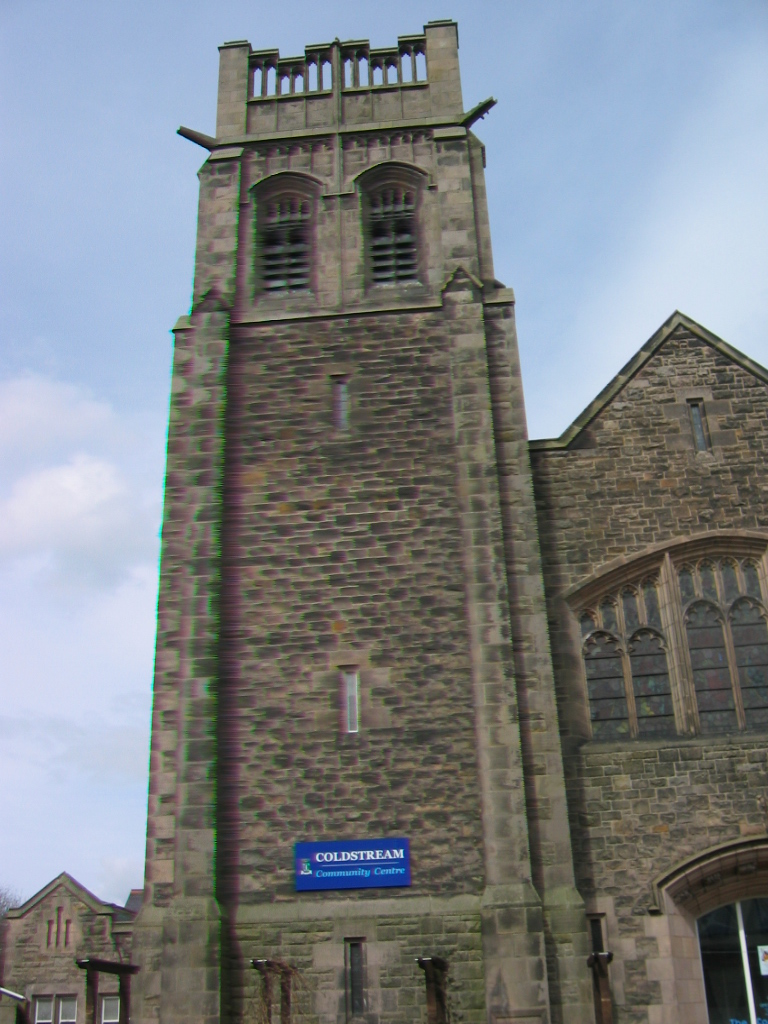
Community Centre, Coldstream

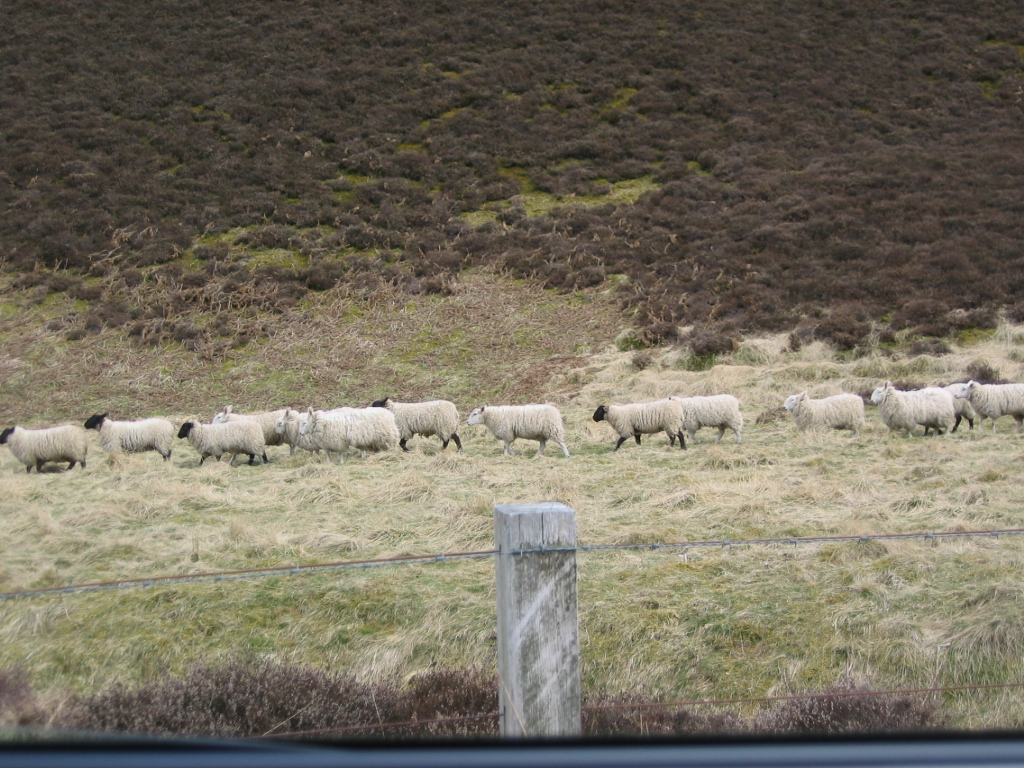
Lammermuir sheep

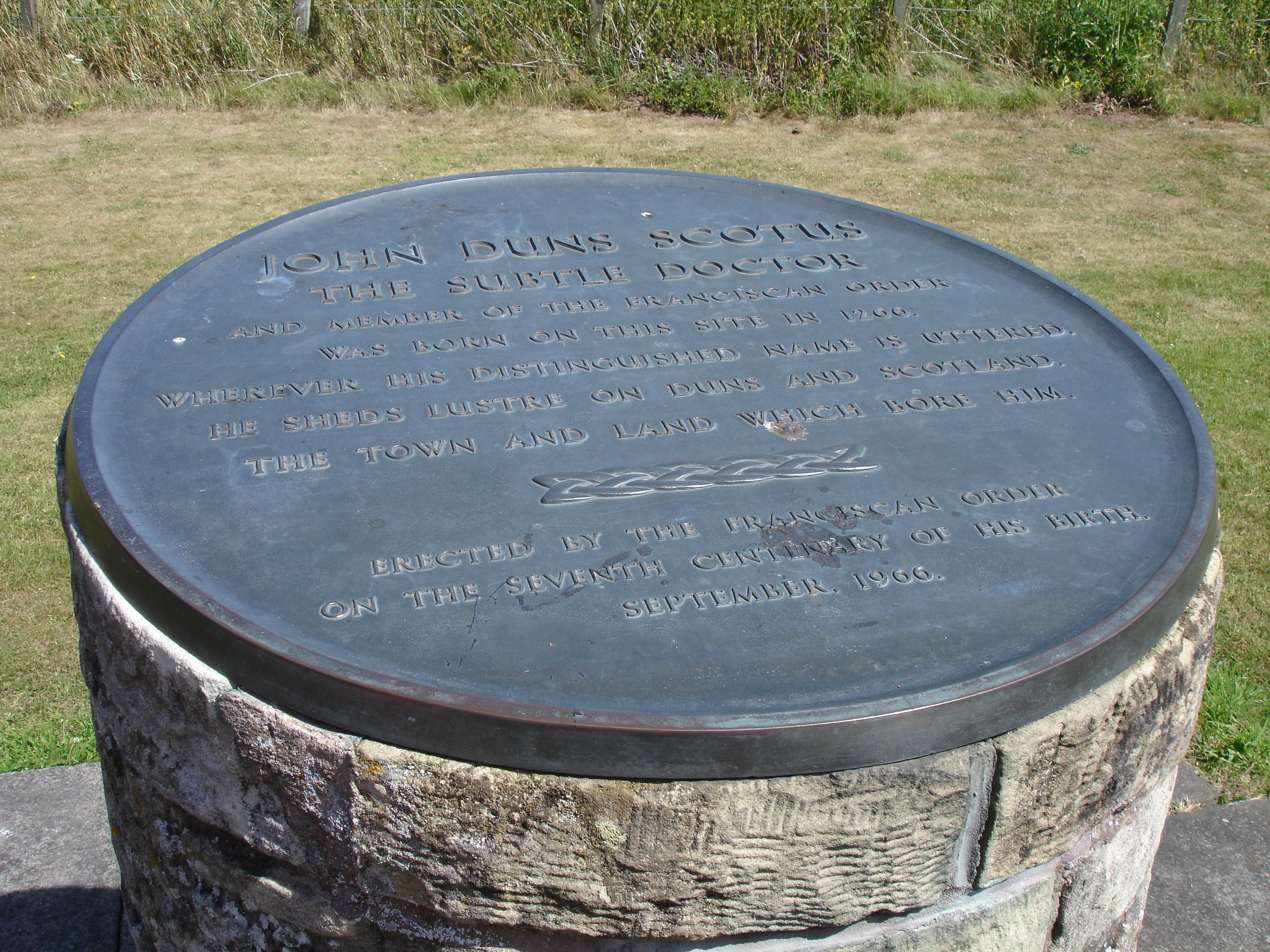
Cairn in honour of Duns Scotus

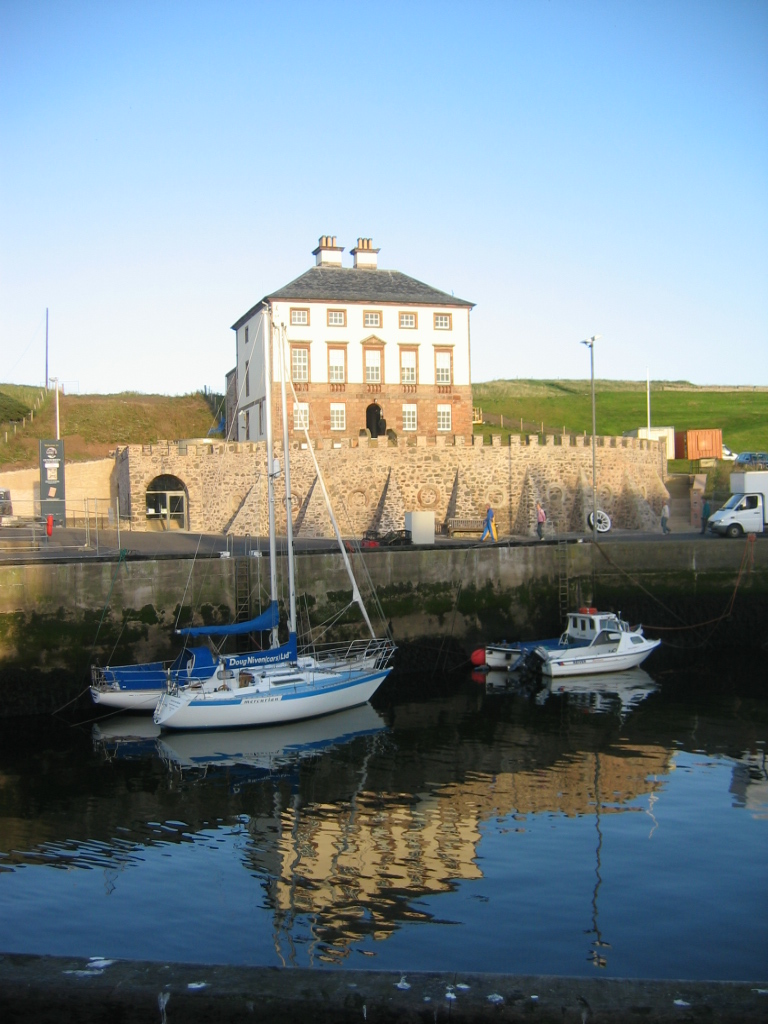
Eyemouth

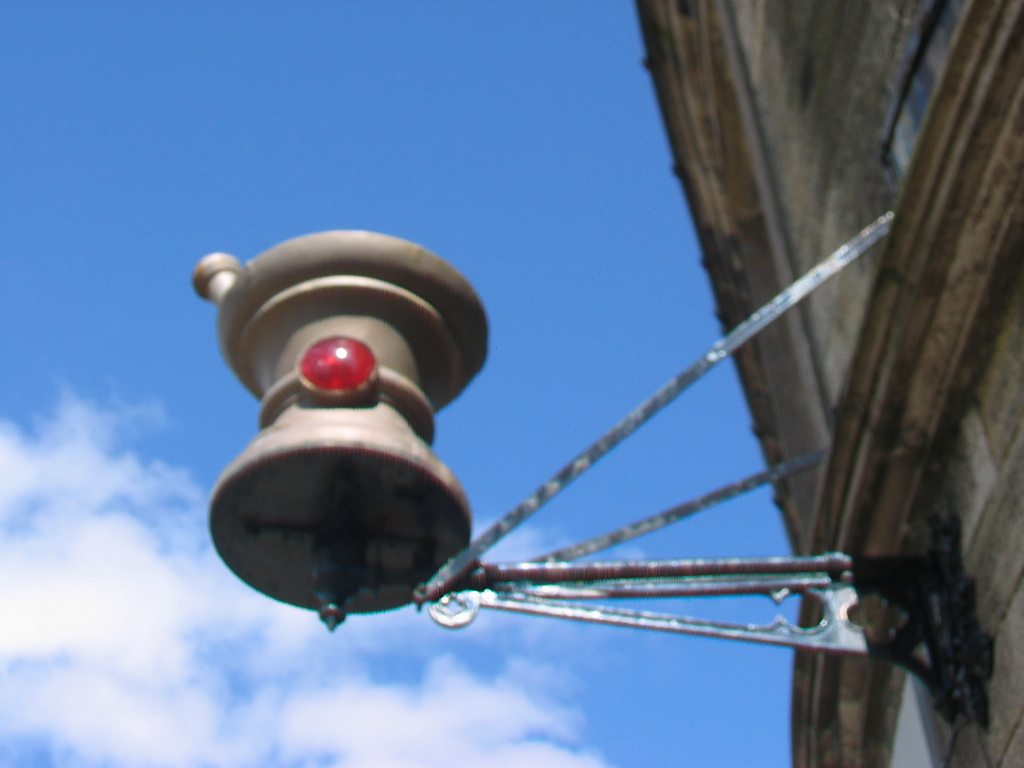
Shop at Innerleithen

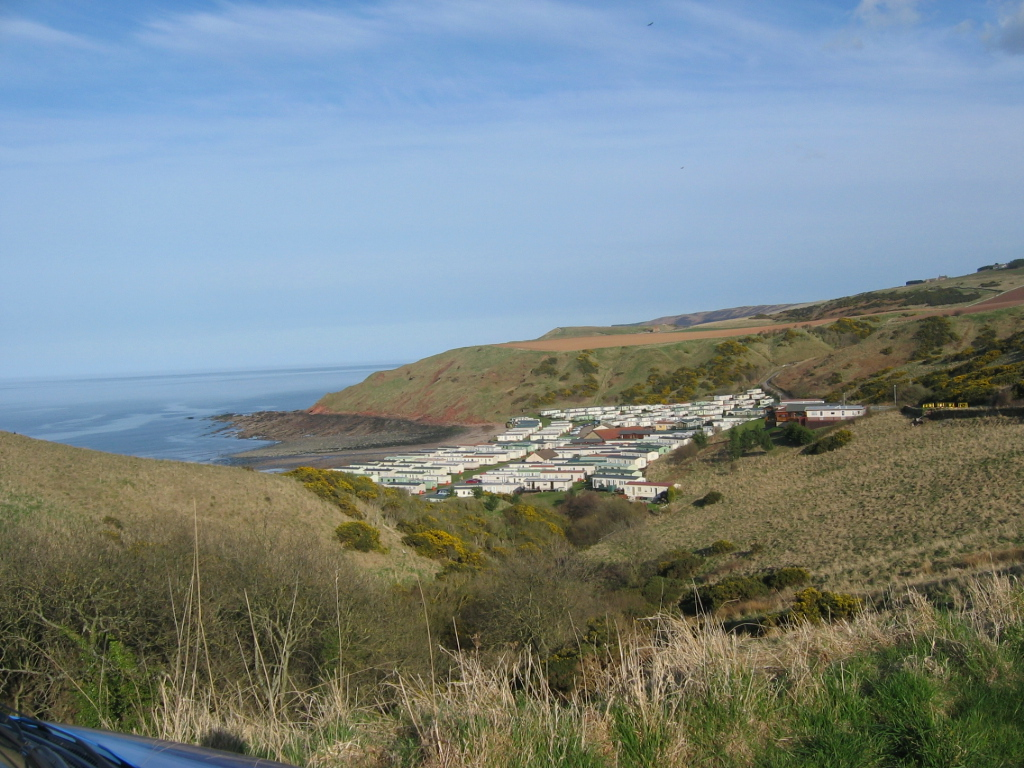
Pease Bay

== A ==
- Abbey Mill
- Abbey St. Bathans
- Abbotsford Ferry railway station, Abbotsford House
- Abbotrule
- Addinston
- Aikwood Tower
- Ale Water
- Alemoor Loch
- Allanbank
- Allanshaugh
- Allanshaws
- Allanton
- Ancrum, Ancrum Old Parish Church
- Anglo-Scottish Border
- Appletreehall
- Ashiestiel
- Ashkirk
- Auchencrow
- Ayton, Ayton Castle, Ayton Parish Church, Ayton railway station

== B ==
- Baddinsgill, Baddinsgill Reservoir
- Bairnkine
- Bassendean
- Battle of Ancrum Moor
- Battle of Humbleton Hill
- Battle of Nesbit Moor (1355)
- Battle of Nesbit Moor (1402)
- Battle of Philiphaugh
- Bedrule
- Bedshiel
- Belses, Belses railway station
- Bellspool
- Bemersyde, Bemersyde House, Bemersyde Moss
- Berwickshire Railway
- Birgham
- Blackadder, Blackadder Water
- Blackcastle Rings
- Blanerne Castle
- Blyth Bridge
- Bogend Farm Cottages, Bogend
- Boleside
- Bonchester Bridge
- Bonjedward
- Bonkyl Kirk
- Boon Farm
- Borders Abbeys Way
- Bordlands
- Borthwick Water
- Bothwell Water
- Bow Castle Broch
- Bowden
- Bowerhope
- Bowhill, Bowhill House
- Bowismiln
- Bowmont Water
- Bowshank
- Branxholme, Branxholme Castle
- Bridgelands
- Broad Law
- Broadhaugh
- Broadmeadows
- Brotherstone Hill
- Broughton
- Baccleuch
- Buckholm
- Burnfoot
- Burnmouth
- Buxley

== C ==
- Caddon Water
- Caddonfoot
- Caddonlee
- Caerlanrig
- Cairn's Mill
- Camptown
- Cappercleuch
- Carcant
- Cardrona, Cardrona Forest
- Carlops
- Carolside
- Carter Bar
- Castle Holydean
- Castlecraig
- Castleton
- Cavers
- Cessford, Cessford Burn, Cessford Castle
- Chambers Institution
- Chesters Estate
- Cheviot Hills
- Chirnside, Chirnside Parish Church
- Chirnsidebridge
- Clappers
- Clintmains
- Clovenfords
- Cockburnspath
- Coldingham, Coldingham Bay, Coldingham Loch, Coldingham Priory
- Coldstream, Coldstream Guards Museum
- Cor Water
- Cove
- Craigierig
- Craik, Craik Forest
- Crailing
- Crailinghall
- Cranshaws
- Cringletie
- Crook Inn
- Crosshall Cross

== D ==
- Darnhall Mains
- Darnick
- Dawyck Botanic Garden, Dawyck Chapel, Dawyck House
- Debatable lands
- Denholm
- Dere Street
- Dewar, Dewar Burn, Dewar Hill, Dewar Water
- Dinlabyre
- Dirrington Great Law, Dirrington Little Law
- Dodcleugh
- Drumelzier
- Drumlanrig Tower
- Dryburgh, Dryburgh Abbey, Dryburgh Abbey Hotel, Dryburgh Bridge
- Dryhope, Dryhope Tower
- Dun Law
- Dunglass Viaduct
- Duns, Duns Castle, Duns Castle nature reserve, Duns Law
- Dunse Spa
- Dye Water

== E ==
- Earlston, Earlston railway station
- Eccles
- Eckford
- Eddleston, Eddleston Water
- Eden Water
- Edgerston, Edgerston House, Edgerston Mill
- Edin's Hall Broch
- Ednam, Ednam Church
- Edrington
- Edrom
- Eildon Hill
- Ettleton
- Ettrick, Ettrick Forest, Ettrick Kirk, Ettrick Marshes, Ettrick Water
- Ettrickbridge
- Eye Water
- Eyemouth, Eyemouth Museum

== F ==
- Falahill
- Faldonside
- Falnash
- Fast Castle
- Fatlips Castle
- Faughill
- Ferniehirst Castle
- Fishwick
- Floors Castle
- Fogo, Fogo Priory
- Foulden
- Fountainhall
- Fruid Water
- Fulton Tower

== G ==
- Gala Water, Galashiels, Galashiels Baptist Church, Galashiels railway station
- Garvald
- Gattonside, Gattonside Suspension Bridge
- Gavington
- George Meikle Kemp Memorial
- Gilmanscleuch
- Gilston
- Glen Ho
- Glenbreck
- Glenholm
- Glentress, Glentress Forest
- Gordon, Gordon Moss
- Gorrenberry
- Grantshouse
- Greenknowe Tower
- Greenlaw
- Greycrook
- Gunsgreen House

== H ==
- Hadrian's Wall
- Halidon Hill
- Halldean Mill
- Halliwell House Museum
- Hallrule
- Hallyards
- Hallyne
- Hare and Dunhog Mosses
- Harecleugh Forest
- Harestanes, Harestanes Visitor Centre
- Harmony Garden
- Harwood on Teviot
- Hassendean, Hassendean railway station
- Hawick, Hawick railway station
- Hawkshaw
- Headshaw Hill
- Heiton
- Heriot, Heriot railway station, Heriot Water
- Hermitage, Hermitage Castle, Hermitage Water
- Heugh Head
- Hillhouse
- Hillslay Tower
- Hilton
- The Hirsel, Hirsel Homestead Museum
- Hobkirk
- Holms Water
- Holylee
- Hornhole Battle Site
- Horsburgh Castle
- Horseley Hill
- Hoselaw Loch and Din Moss
- Houndslow
- Housesteads Roman Fort
- Hownam
- Hume, Hume Castle
- Hurkar Rocks
- Hutton
- Hyndhope

== I ==
- Innerleithen

== J ==
- James Hutton Trail
- James Thomson Memorial
- Jed Water, Jedburgh,
- Jedburgh Abbey
- Jedburgh Castle
- Jedburgh Greyfriars
- Jedburgh Town Hall
- Jim Clark Room
- John Buchan Centre, John Buchan Way
- Johnnie Armstrong's Grave

== K ==
- Kailzie Gardens
- Kaim Knowe
- Kale Water
- Kalemouth, Kalemouth Suspension Bridge,
- Kelloe House
- Kelso, Kelso Abbey, Kelso Racecourse
- Kershope Burn
- Kilbucho
- Killochyett
- Kilnsike Tower
- Kimmerghame House
- Kingledoors
- Kirk Yetholm
- Kirkbride Parish Church
- Kirkburn
- Kirkhope, Kirkhope Law, Kirkhope Tower
- Kirkhouse
- Kirkton
- Kirktonhill
- Kirkurd
- Kirna House (The Kirna, also Grangehill)

== L ==
- Ladykirk, Ladykirk and Norham Bridge
- Lake of the Hirsel
- Lambden
- Lamberton
- Lammer Law
- Lammermuir Hills
- Langhaugh
- Langton Parish Church
- Lanton, Lanton Moor, Lanton Tower, Lanton Wood
- Lauder, Lauder Common
- Lauderdale
- Leadburn
- Leader Water
- Leaderfoot, Leaderfoot Viaduct
- Leithen Water
- Legerwood, Legerwood Kirk
- Leitholm
- Lempitlaw
- Liddel Castle, Liddel Water
- Liddesdale
- Lilliesleaf
- Lindean, Lindean Loch, Lindean Reservoir
- Linhope
- Lintlaw
- Littledean Tower
- Littledeanless
- Longformacus
- Luggate Water
- Lumsdaine Moor
- Lyne, Lyne Kirk, Lyne railway station, Lyne Viaduct, Lyne Water

== M ==
- Manderston House
- Manor Water
- Marchmont Estate, Marchmont House
- Maxton
- Maxwellheugh
- Megget Reservoir, Megget Water
- Mellerstain, Mellerstain House
- Melrose, Melrose Abbey, Melrose railway station
- Menzion
- Mervinslaw Pele
- Midlem
- Millholm Cross
- Minch Moor
- Minto
- Mire Loch
- Moffat Hills
- Monteviot House
- Moorfoot Hills
- Mordington
- Morebattle
- Mountbenger
- Mountmill Roman Fortlet
- Mowhaugh

== N ==
- Neidpath Castle, Neidpath Tunnel, Neidpath Viaduct
- Nenthorn
- Nether Horsburgh Castle
- Nether Shiels
- Newark Castle
- Newbigging
- Newcastleton
- Newlands
- Newmill-on-Teviot
- Newstead
- Newtown St Boswells
- Ninestane Rig,
- Nisbet, Nisbet Castle, Nisbet House
- Northfield

== O ==
- Old Belses
- Old Cambus
- Old Gala House
- Old Parish Church of Peebles
- Oliver Castle
- Oxnam, Oxnam Water
- Oxton

== P ==
- Paxton, Paxton House
- Pease Bay
- Pease Dean
- Peatrig Hill
- Peebles, Old Parish Church of Peebles, Peebles Hydro
- Peel Fell
- Peniel Heugh
- Penmanshiel Tunnel
- Pennine Way
- Pennymuir
- Pentland Hills
- Philiphaugh
- Piperdean
- Pirn Hill
- Plenderleith
- Polmood
- Polwarth, Polwarth Parish Church
- Portmore Loch
- Press Castle
- Preston, Preston Bridge
- Primrosehill
- Priorwood Garden

== Q ==
- Quair Water

== R ==
- Redpath
- Redscarhead
- Reston
- Riccarton Junction railway station
- The Riggs
- River Rede
- River Teviot
- River Till
- River Tweed
- Robert Smail's Printing Works
- Roberton
- Roman Heritage Way
- Romannobridge
- Royal Border Bridge
- Royal Tweed Bridge
- Roxburgh, Roxburgh Castle
- Roxburgh (village)
- Rubers Law
- Rule Water
- Ruletownhead

== S ==
- Salenside
- Saughtree, Saughtree railway station
- Scots' Dike
- Scott's View
- Selkirk, Selkirk Castle, Selkirk Common
- Shankend
- Siccar Point
- Simprim
- Sir Walter Scott Way
- Skirling
- Skirmish Hill
- Smailholm, Smailholm Tower
- Soonhope
- Sourhope
- Southdean
- Southern Upland Way
- Soutra Aisle
- Spittal-on-Rule
- Sprouston
- St. Abbs, St Abb's Head, St. Abbs and Eyemouth Voluntary Marine Reserve
- St. Boswells, St. Boswells railway station
- St. Cuthbert's Way
- St. Mary's Loch
- Stagehall
- Stanhope
- Stichill, Stichill Kirk
- Stobo, Stobo Castle, Stobo Kirk, Stobo railway station
- Stow of Wedale, Stow railway station
- Sundhope
- Swinside Hall
- Swinton
- Symington, Biggar and Broughton Railway

== T ==
- Talla Linnfoots, Talla Railway, Talla Reservoir, Talla Water
- Teviothead
- Thirlestane, Thirlestane Castle
- Thornielee
- Timpendean Tower
- Torquhan
- Torsonce,
- Town Yetholm
- Traquair, Traquair Forest, Traquair House
- Trimontium
- Tweed Viaduct
- Tweedbank, Tweedbank railway station
- Tweedmouth railway station
- Tweedsmuir

== U ==
- Union Bridge
- Upper Hindhope
- Upper Tweed Valley

== V ==
- Venlaw

== W ==
- Walkerburn
- Watch Water, Watch Water Reservoir
- Waterloo Monument
- Wauchope, Wauchope Forest
- Waverley Railway
- Wedderburn Castle
- West Linton
- Westruther
- Westwater Reservoir
- Whiteadder Water
- Whitehope Law
- Whithaugh Park
- Whitlaw, Whitlaw Wood
- Whitrope, Whitrope Siding, Whitrope Tunnel
- Whitslaid Tower
- Whitsome
- William Chambers Birthplace
- William Wallace Statue
- Williamhope
- Williamslee
- Wilton
- Wilton Dean
- Windy Gyle
- Windydoors
- Woll
- Wrae Tower

== Y ==
- Yair
- Yarrow Stone
- Yarrow Water
- Yarrowford
- Yearning Flow
- Yetholm Loch

== See also ==
- List of places in Scotland
