= Megget Water =

River in Scottish Borders, Scotland

Coordinates: 55.4897°N 3.1994°W

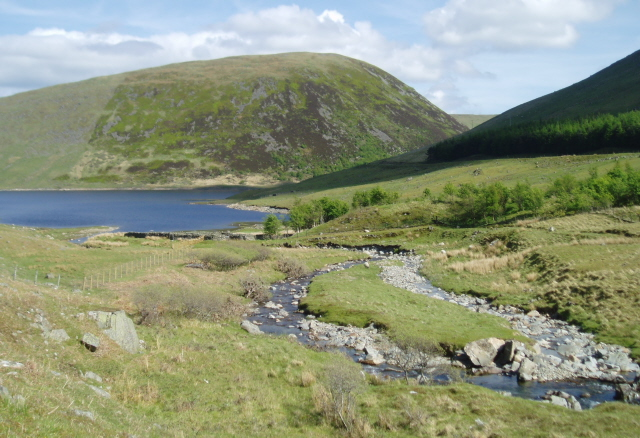
The Megget Reservoir and Megget Water, Selkirkshire

Megget Water is a river in the parish of Yarrow, Selkirkshire in the Scottish Borders area of Scotland. The Water rises at Broad Law (2,760 ft), passes through Megget Reservoir and empties into St Mary's Loch. Places in the vicinity include Cappercleuch, Craigierig, Cramalt Tower, the Glengaber Burn, Meggethead Farm.

The Megget area, formerly a parish united with Lyne, Scottish Borders, is of geological and archaeological interest, through stone artifacts at Henderland in the lower Megget valley (now in Wilton Lodge Museum, Hawick), and discoveries of gold.

A proclamation concerning gold mining in Scotland was made at Henderland in July 1576. Gold was property of the crown and was to be sold to the royal mint.

== See also ==
- Rivers of Scotland
- List of places in the Scottish Borders
- List of places in Scotland
