= Baddinsgill =

Locality in Scottish Borders, Scotland

Coordinates: 55.78150°N 3.39460°W

Baddinsgill is a hamlet in the Scottish Borders area of Scotland. The Baddinsgill Reservoir is a few hundred metres north of the hamlet.

== See also ==
- List of places in the Scottish Borders
- List of places in Scotland
