= Bedshiel =

Village in the Scottish Borders area of Scotland

Coordinates: 55.75261°N 2.50411°W

Bedshiel is a village in the Scottish Borders area of Scotland on the B6456, six miles from Duns, two miles from Greenlaw, Longformacus and Westruther.

The Watch Water Reservoir, Millknowe Burn and Bogpark Burn are close by.

The Kaims

Bedshiel Esker was formed from gravel deposited by a subglacial stream.

- Southern Uplands Partnership: Bedshiel Esker
- Definition of Esker

== See also ==
- List of places in the Scottish Borders
- List of places in Scotland
- Anglo-Scottish border
- Debatable lands
