= Garvald =

Garvald can refer to:

- Garvald, East Lothian
- Garvald, Scottish Borders
- Garvald, South Lanarkshire
