= Megget =

Coordinates: 55.491571°N 3.2629476°W

- Location within the Scottish Borders
- OS grid reference: NT203227
- Council area: Scottish Borders
- Country: Scotland
- Sovereign state: United Kingdom
- Post town: Selkirk
- Postcode district: TD7
- Dialling code: 01750
- Police: Scotland
- Fire: Scottish
- Ambulance: Scottish
- UK Parliament: Berwickshire, Roxburgh and Selkirk
- Scottish Parliament: Ettrick, Roxburgh and Berwickshire

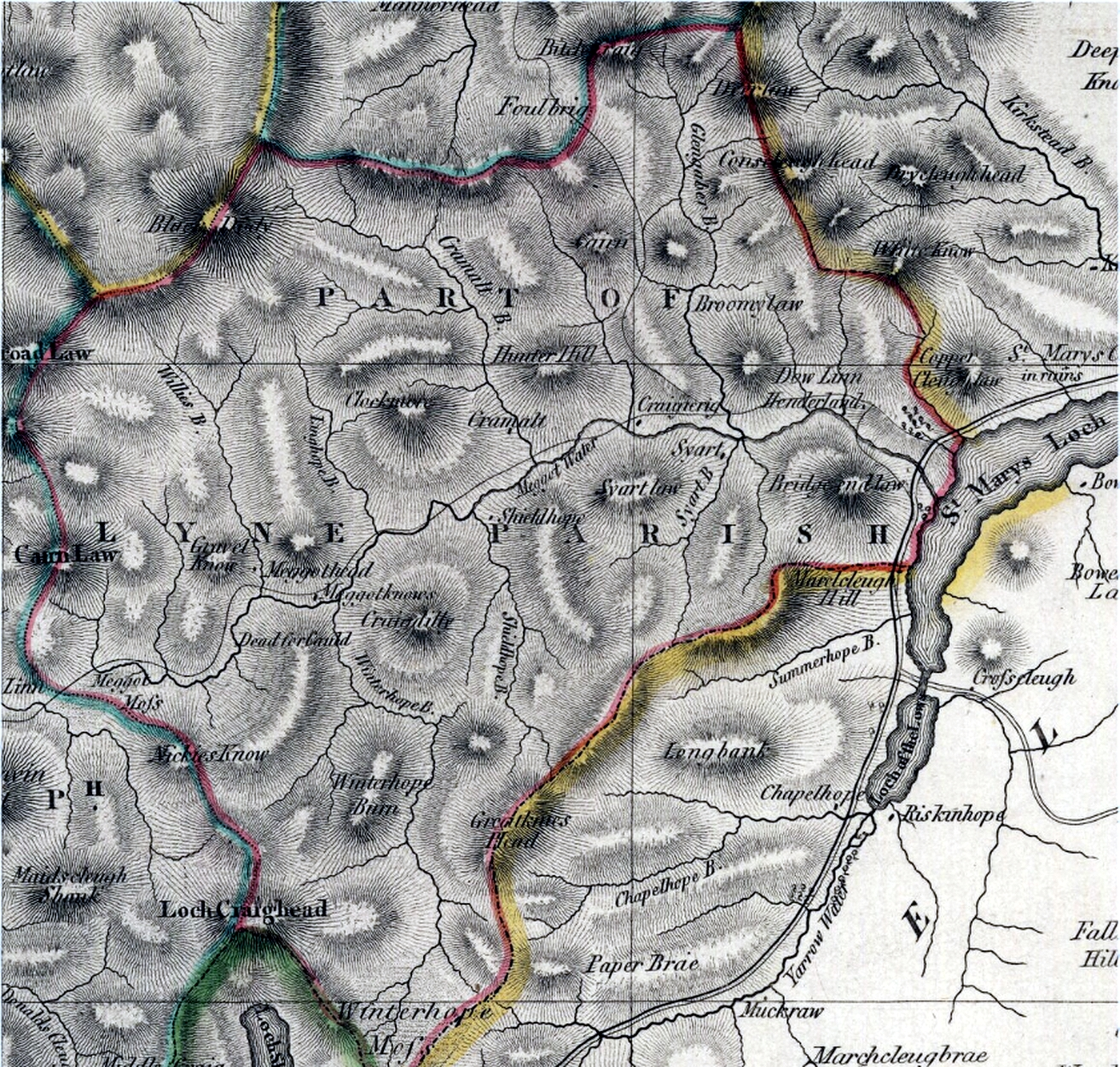
Parish of Lyne and Megget: Megget part (1821)

Megget is a former chapelry or parish containing the valley of Megget Water, now forming the westernmost part of the parish of Yarrow, Selkirkshire in the Scottish Borders area of Scotland. The centre of the valley is 19 miles (31 kilometres) west of Selkirk.

The district is bordered on the west by the parish of Tweedsmuir, on the north-west by Drumelzier and on the north by Manor (all in Peeblesshire). On the east side it is joined to the rest of the present parish of Yarrow, but formerly the parish boundary with Yarrow ran southwards from Black Law to Deer Law to Cappercleuch burn thence to St. Mary's Loch and continued down the west shore of the loch for almost one mile (1.5 kilometres) to Mare Cleuch by the Rodono Hotel. It is bounded on the south by Ettrick in Selkirkshire and on the south-west by Moffat in Dumfriesshire. Megget Stone lies on the western parish boundary, with Tweedsmuir.

It is about seven miles (eleven kilometres) long north to south and about six miles (ten kilometres) wide with an area of 14,500 acres (5,900 hectares).

The population of Megget in 1861 was 53 and in 1901 was 73. At the latest census (in 2011) the population of Megget was around 50.

The parish of Megget derived its name from the river Megget, which took its name from the whey colour of its waters (Gaelic or old Welsh). Until 1891 it was part of Peeblesshire and thus part of Tweeddale, however "the water of Meggit is the only water in Tweeddale, that pays no tribute to Tweed; but runs from the south-east, some five miles [8 km], and ends its course in the bosom of St Mary Loch, and from thence, with Yarrow, watereth the wοόdy banks of the Forrest" (namely Ettrick Forest – the county of Selkirkshire).

== Geography ==
Megget is almost entirely covered with hills, which extend in two parallel ranges from west to east, having between them a narrow valley, which scarcely in any part exceeds 1/4 mile (400 metres) in breadth.

Megget Water, rising at an elevation of 1,500 feet (460 metres), winds seven miles (eleven kilometres) east-northeastward to St Mary's Loch, on the way being joined by Cramalt, Glengaber, and sixteen other burns. Along St Mary's Loch the surface declines to close on 800 ft (240 m) above sealevel. Megget Reservoir was opened in 1983, with a dam just upstream of the confluence of Megget Water and Glengaber Burn, flooding the area below 1,096 ft (334 m) west of the dam.

The settlements in Megget, from west to east are: Meggethead, Winterhopeburn, Cramalt (and East Cramalt), Craigierig, Glengaber, Syart, Henderland and Cappercleuch.

== History ==
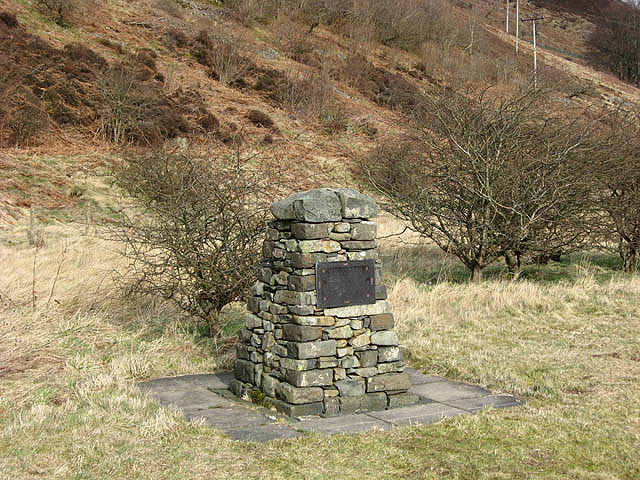
Megget War Memorial formerly located at Megget chapel

Anciently, the vale of Megget was known as Rodonna, and formed a favourite hunting-ground of the Scottish sovereigns, until the deer were extirpated or became scarce in the reign of Queen Mary. The ancient barony of Rodonna, comprising the vale of Megget, was granted by Alexander II to Melrose Abbey in 1236.

Before the union with England defensive towers were built in Megget, serving as both watch towers and signalling stations. The tower at Cramalt is mentioned in 1530 and 1555 and its remains were visible until inundation by Megget Reservoir. It has been partially reconstructed just above the shoreline of the reservoir.

At Henderland, in the east of the parish, there is a ruin of a church, which is surrounded by a cemetery. Before 1810 there were no other remains of an ecclesiastical edifice and this was assumed to be the ancient church of Megget. The chapel at Henderland was on the north bank of the Megget, not far from its confluence with the St Mary’s Loch. On a tombstone found in the ruins in the mid 18th century, were sculptured a cross and sword, with the legend ' here lyes perys of Cokburne and his wyfe Marjory.'

This district, apparently a chapelry before the Reformation, appears to have been assigned anciently to the parish of Traquair. Even in the mid 17th century there were references to Henderland and other places in Megget being described as in the parish of St Bride of Traquair, to which it would seem the district had previously belonged.

In 1614 it was recorded that John Fawsyde was minister of Rodonno, Henderland, or Megget; also that Newlands and Kirkurd were also under his care.

By an Act of the Scottish Parliament of 1621, the Parish of Rodonno or Megget was joined to that of Lyne, a parish about 14 mi (23 km) north without any proper connecting road. This union took place in consequence of a joint petition from the Proprietor of both parishes, Lord Hay, of Yester, and the inhabitants of Megget to the Lords Commissioners for Plantation of Kirks, desiring that Megget might henceforth be part of Lyne. It is unique that Megget was not united to one of the neighbouring parishes, but instead to a parish which is so distant from it. The smallness of the stipends might have been a reason, also that both parishes belonged wholly to the same proprietor, Lord Hay of Yester, and, it is more than probable, that he had considerable influence in procuring the annexation.

For 270 years Lyne and Megget formed a united parish, but because of physical separation, Megget had certain attributes of a parish. Like other parishes it was a Registration District. As reported in 1839, Commissioners found that the church in Lyne and chapel in Megget operated independently with their own arrangements, but with a common minister who attended Megget one Sunday in three. None of the parishioners of Meggett attended the church in Lyne.

Following a review by a Boundary Commission, the union of the two parishes was dissolved by an Order which came into operation on 15 May 1891. It was ordered that the detached part of the Parish of Lyne and Megget ceased to be part of that Parish and of the County of Peebles; instead it would form part of the Parish of Yarrow and of the County of Selkirk, while the remainder of Lyne and Megget would be known as the Parish of Lyne.

However this change did not at first disturb the ecclesiastical arrangements. The 1901 census reported that ecclesiastically Lyne and Megget continued to exist, with one part in Peeblesshire in the (civil) parish of Lyne, while another part was now in Selkirkshire in the (civil) parish of Yarrow. Then, after the First World War a memorial was erected in Lyne Church for entitled: Parish of Lyne and Megget, European War 1914, Roll Of Honour. Also a war memorial was erected in Megget for that district.

After the union of the United Free Church of Scotland and the Church of Scotland in 1929, a number of congregations were merged, with some churches and chapels being closed or sub-ordinated to others. Megget ecclesiastical parish was disjoined from Lyne in 1948 and in the same year Megget united with Yarrow and Lyne united with Manor. The chapel in Megget was closed and the Free Church at Cappercleuch became the local place of worship, served by the minister of the parish of Yarrow.

== Chapel ==
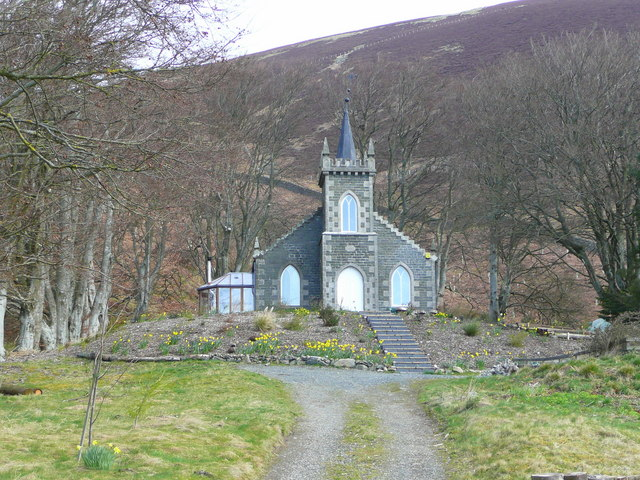
Cappercleuch Kirk

At Henderland there are the vestiges of a chapel and burial ground, and a tombstone of Cockburn of Henderland, a noted freebooter, with an inscription which is still legible. There are the foundations of a rectangular, single-chambered chapel, measuring 24 ft by 41 ft. These are sited on the summit of Chapel Knowe and are evidently the Kirk of Enderland, which was described in the Records of the Presbytery of Peebles in 1603 as 'altogedder down and equall wt ye erd', i.e. in a ruinous state.

Although there was reference to building a church in the Act of Parliament that united the parish with Lyne, it appears that the minister had to preach in farm houses in the area. Then a chapel was erected around 1804, with an apartment in it designed for a school.

It was situated in the centre of the valley, 2 1/2 mi (4 km) from the farthest parish boundary, between Cramalt and Craigierig. The site is now submerged under the reservoir. This was built, not at the expense of the heritors of the parish (the usual practice), but with money raised by the parish combined with the aid of the resident farmers, who assisted in collecting materials. It had a slate roof and seats and was maintained by voluntary contribution, although by the 1830s it was in want of repair. It was restored and became known as the "Tin Kirk", but by the 1950s it was closed and being used as a hay shed.

Megget War Memorial was originally erected in or by this chapel, but when the church was drowned under Megget Reservoir, it was moved to the old Cappercleuch Church

A church was built in Cappercleuch in 1845, one of the first church buildings of the Free Church of Scotland, which broke away from the Church of Scotland only two years earlier. It continued to be used as a church until 1995, when declining attendance forced it to close. It is now a private house. The war memorial of Megget was then moved to its present site at the junction of the main road through Megget with the road alongside St Mary’s Loch.
