= Coldingham Loch =

Freshwater loch in Coldingham, Scotland

Coordinates: 55.9105°N 2.1699°W

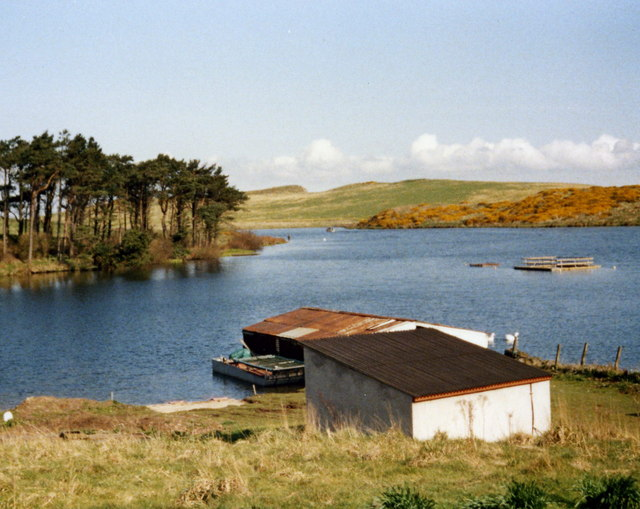
Coldingham Loch

Coldingham Loch is a freshwater loch in the parish of Coldingham, in the Scottish Borders area of Scotland, in the former Berwickshire, between Coldingham Moor and St Abb's Head. The loch is a natural spring-fed 22-acre (8.9 ha) loch, about 300 yards (270 m) from the sea and about 300 feet (91 m) above sea level; it is used for fly fishing for rainbow trout and brown and blue trout. The area is also used for pheasant shooting.

The Scottish Borders Council has described Coldingham Loch as "eutrophic open water, with high levels of plant nutrient, turbid water caused by high plankton levels; coarse fish generally dominant; in natural state supports high levels of biodiversity; often important wildfowl sites".

== See also ==
- List of places in the Scottish Borders
- List of places in Scotland
