= Garvald, Scottish Borders =

Village in Scottish Borders, Scotland

Coordinates: 55°45′06″N 3°01′42″W

Map showing the location of Garvald within Scotland.

Garvald (Scots: Garvit Scottish Gaelic: Garbh Allt, meaning the "rough burn") is a hamlet on the B7007, near Dewar, by the Dewar Burn, in the Moorfoot Hills, in the Scottish Borders area of Scotland, in the former Peeblesshire.

Places nearby include Borthwick Hall, Heriot, the Leithen Water, Peatrig Hill, and Peebles.

This Garvald lends its name to a charity which works with disabled people..

== See also ==
- Garvald, East Lothian
- Garvald, South Lanarkshire
- List of places in the Scottish Borders
- List of places in Scotland
