= Falnash =

Village in Scottish Borders, Scotland

Coordinates: 55°20′48″N 2°58′31″W

Falnash (Scots: Fawenesh) is a village in the Scottish Borders of Scotland. It is near Teviothead, in the former Roxburghshire, and in the parish of Teviothead.

There was a chapel in Falnash, but no structural remains can be seen.

== See also ==
- List of places in the Scottish Borders
- List of places in Scotland
