= Greycrook =

Village in Scottish Borders, Scotland

Coordinates: 55°33′59″N 2°38′13″W

Greycrook is a village off the A68 and the A699 in the Scottish Borders, approximately 500 m (550 yd) south-east of St Boswells, and close to Dryburgh, Dryburgh Abbey, Maxton, Newtown St Boswells, and the River Tweed.

It was here that the highest temperature in Scotland, 32.9 °C (91.2 °F), was recorded on 9 August 2003. The record was beaten on 19 July 2022, when 34.8 °C (94.6 °F) was recorded in Chaterhall during the 2022 European Heat Waves.

== See also ==
- Climate of Scotland
- United Kingdom weather records
- List of places in the Scottish Borders
- List of places in Scotland
