= Bowismiln =

Village in Scottish Borders, Scotland

Coordinates: 55.49°N 02.79°W

- Location within the Scottish Borders
- OS grid reference: NT5023
- Council area: Scottish Borders
- Country: Scotland
- Sovereign state: United Kingdom
- Police: Scotland
- Fire: Scottish
- Ambulance: Scottish
- UK Parliament: Berwickshire, Roxburgh and Selkirk
- Scottish Parliament: Ettrick, Roxburgh and Berwickshire

Bowismiln is a village in the Scottish Borders area of Scotland.

== See also ==
- List of places in the Scottish Borders
- List of places in Scotland
