= Hilton, Berwickshire =

Village in Scottish Borders, Scotland

Coordinates: 55°44′48″N 2°11′00″W

Map showing the location of Hilton within Scotland.

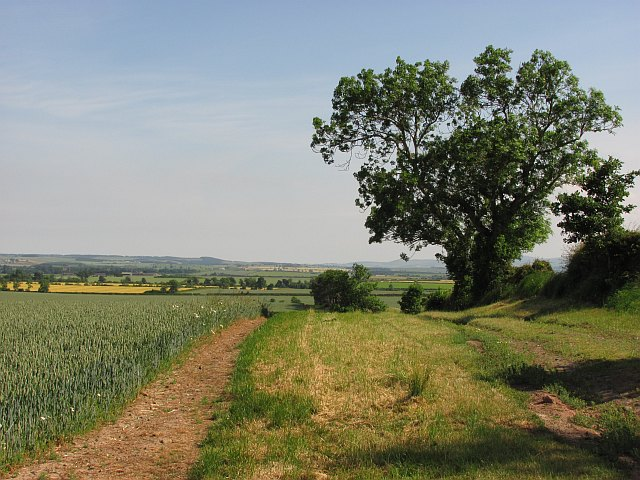
A wheatfield at Hilton

Hilton is a small village in Berwickshire, Scottish Borders, Scotland.

A Precept for Remission, dated 5th January 1573/4 at Haddington, was granted to Thomas Broun in Hiltoun (and others) for his part in the slaughter of Richard Lauder, younger of that Ilk, in June 1567",

== See also ==
- List of places in the Scottish Borders
- List of places in Scotland
