= Bowerhope =

Village in Scottish Borders, Scotland

Coordinates: 55.48°N 03.18°W

- Location within the Scottish Borders
- OS grid reference: NT2522
- Council area: Scottish Borders
- Country: Scotland
- Sovereign state: United Kingdom
- Police: Scotland
- Fire: Scottish
- Ambulance: Scottish
- UK Parliament: Berwickshire, Roxburgh and Selkirk
- Scottish Parliament: Ettrick, Roxburgh and Berwickshire

Bowerhope is a village off the A708, in the Scottish Borders area of Scotland, on the banks of St Mary's Loch in Ettrick Forest.

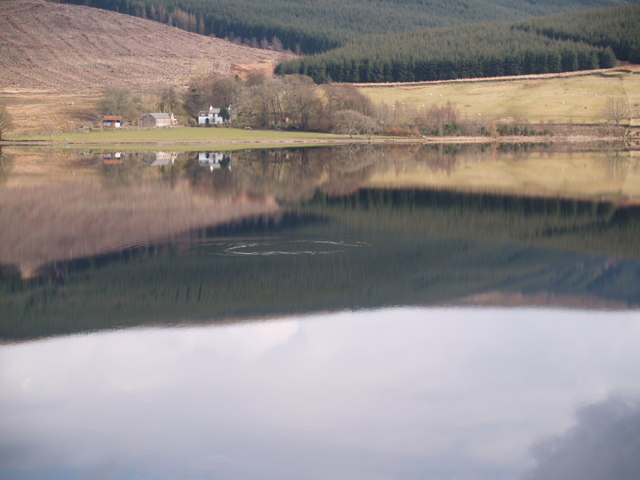
Bowerhope, looking across St Mary's Loch

== See also ==
- List of places in the Scottish Borders
- List of places in Scotland
