= Black Castle =

Black Castle may refer to:

== Buildings and structures ==
=== Ireland ===
- Leighlinbridge Castle, or Black Castle, Leighlinbridge, County Carlow, a ruined castle
- Black Castle, Lough Gur, County Limerick, a ruined castle
- Castle Troy, or Black Castle, a ruined 13th century castle in Castletroy, County Limerick
- Black Castle, Templemore, County Tipperary, a ruined castle; ; see List of castles in Ireland
- Black Castle, Thurles, County Tipperary, a ruined castle; see List of castles in Ireland
- Black Castle, Wicklow town, a ruined castle

=== Scotland ===
- Black Castle, East Lothian, an Iron Age hillfort
- Black Castle of Moulin, near Pitlochry, a ruined castle

=== Elsewhere ===
- Black Castle, Bristol, England, a pub
- Castle of St John the Baptist, also known as Castillo Negro (Black Castle), Santa Cruz de Tenerife

== Other uses ==
- Black Castle, a 2006 album by Royal Fam
- The Black Castle, a 1952 American horror film
- The Black Castle (radio program), an American 1940s radio series
- Massey Energy, formerly Black Castle Mining Co.

== See also ==
- Blackcastle Rings, Scotland
