= Bowshank =

Village in Scottish Borders, Scotland

Coordinates: 55.65°N 02.87°W

- Location within the Scottish Borders
- OS grid reference: NT4541
- Council area: Scottish Borders
- Country: Scotland
- Sovereign state: United Kingdom
- Police: Scotland
- Fire: Scottish
- Ambulance: Scottish
- UK Parliament: Berwickshire, Roxburgh and Selkirk
- Scottish Parliament: Midlothian South, Tweeddale and Lauderdale

Bowshank is a village in the Scottish Borders area of Scotland, close to the A7, beside the Gala Water.

Nearby are Bow Castle Broch, as well as Buckholm, Clovenfords, the Lugate Water, Torsonce and Stow.

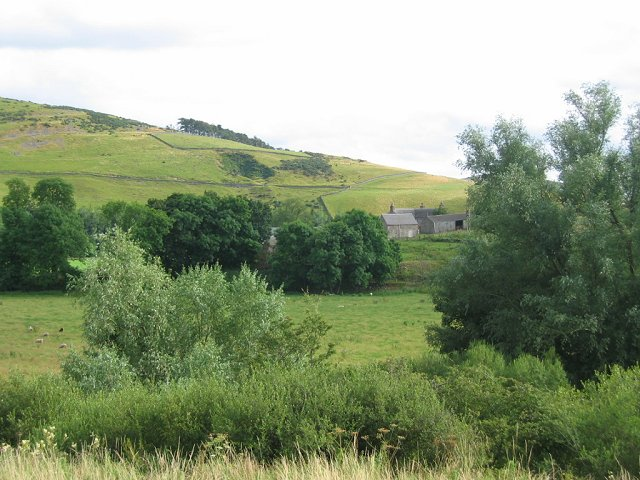
The village Bowshank

== See also ==
- List of places in the Scottish Borders
- List of places in Scotland
