= Peatrig Hill =

Minor hill in Scotland

Coordinates: 55.72746°N 3.02057°W

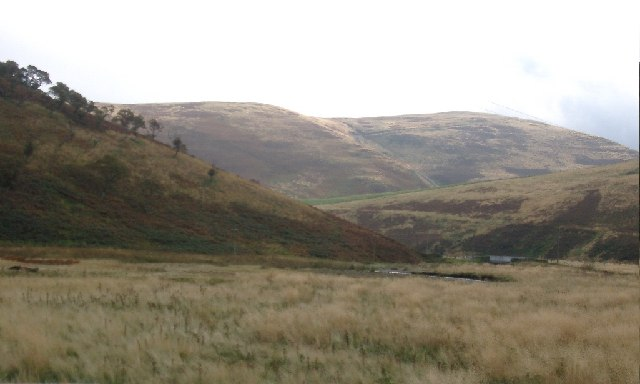
- Windy Knowe, Whiteside Law, Peatrig Hill

Highest point
- Listing: (none)

Geography
- Location: Moorfoot Hills, Scotland
- OS grid: NT360487
- Topo map: OS Landranger 73

Peatrig Hill is a minor hill in Scotland, located about 15 km south-southeast of Edinburgh. One of the Moorfoot Hills, it is located in the parish of Heriot in the Scottish Borders Council Area.

Other hills in the Moorfoot Hills include Blackhope Scar (651m), Dewar Hill, Garvald Law, Rough Moss (601m).

Other places in the vicinity include Borthwick Hall, Dewar, the Dewar Burn, the Gala Water, Garvald, Glentress and the Glentress Forest, the Heriot Water, and Stow.

== See also ==
- List of places in the Scottish Borders
- List of places in Scotland
