= Legerwood =

Historic village in Scotland

Coordinates: 55°41′N 2°40′W

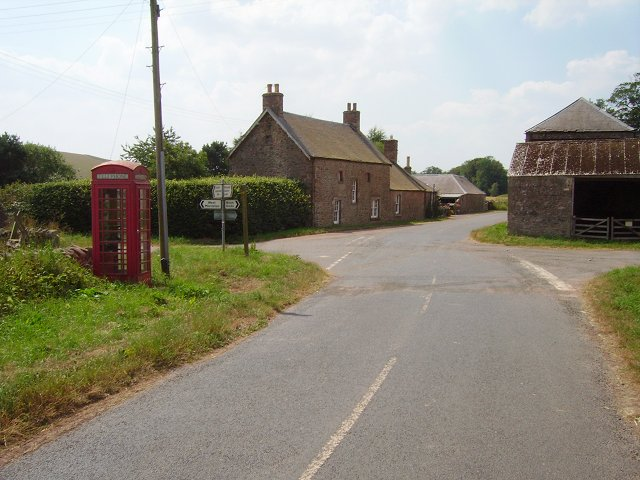
The crossroads in Legerwood

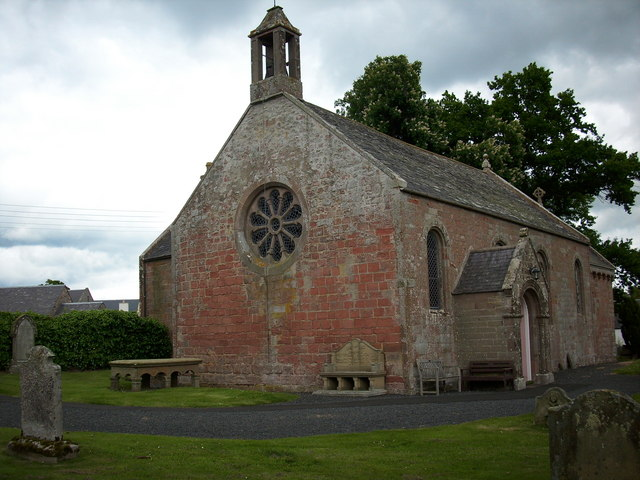
Legerwood Kirk, at Kirkhill, half a mile east of the hamlet

Legerwood is a village by the Eden Water, in the Scottish Borders area of Scotland, near Lauder, near the Southern Upland Way.

In is recorded on Pont's map as Lygertwode.

Legerwood Kirk is outside the village and has been there since at least 1127.

Places nearby include Boon Farm, Gordon, Greenlaw, Kelso, Melrose, Westruther, Earlston.

== Pronunciation ==
The township name is pronounced Le-JER-wood, containing ⟨g⟩ phonically produced as ⟨j⟩.

== See also ==
- List of places in the Scottish Borders
- List of places in Scotland
- Legerwood, Tasmania, a locality in Australia
