= Bellspool =

Village in Scottish Borders, Scotland

Coordinates: 55.60379°N 3.33585°W

Bellspool is a village in the Scottish Borders area of Scotland, near to Drumelzier, Hopcarton and Kingledoors

== See also ==
- List of places in the Scottish Borders
- List of places in Scotland
