= Cappercleuch =

Village in Scottish Borders, Scotland

Coordinates: 55.4956°N 3.1992°W

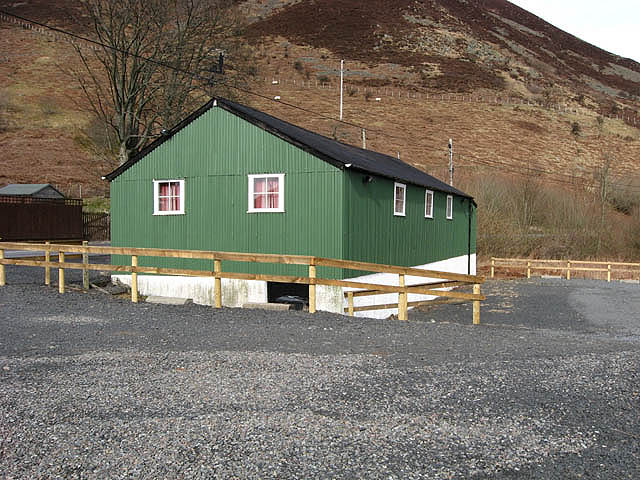
- Cappercleuch Village Hall

- Location within the Scottish Borders
- OS grid reference: NT233232
- Council area: Scottish Borders
- Lieutenancy area: Tweeddale
- Country: Scotland
- Sovereign state: United Kingdom
- Post town: SELKIRK
- Postcode district: TD7
- Police: Scotland
- Fire: Scottish
- Ambulance: Scottish
- UK Parliament: Berwickshire, Roxburgh and Selkirk
- Scottish Parliament: Ettrick, Roxburgh and Berwickshire

Cappercleuch (historically called Coppercleugh) is a settlement on the A708, at St. Mary's Loch in the Scottish Borders area of Scotland, in the historic county of Selkirkshire.

Places nearby include Bowerhope Law, Craigierig, Deer Law, the Dryhope Tower, Ettrickbridge, the Ettrick Forest, the Megget Reservoir, the Megget Water, Mountbenger, the former Tibbie Shiels Inn, the Yarrow Water and the Glen Cafe overlooking the Loch of the Lowes.

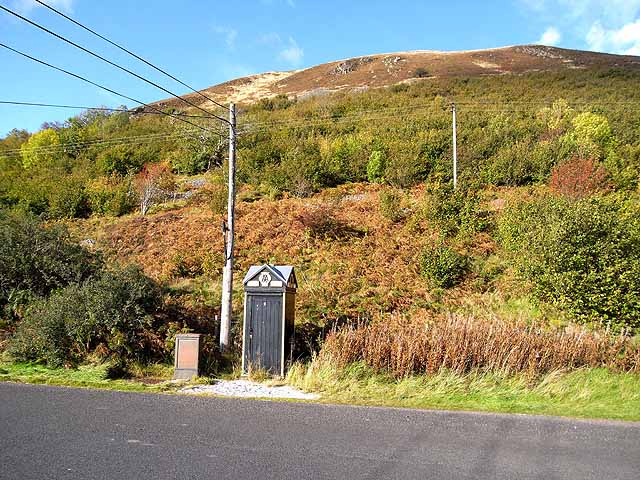
The old AA phone box near Cappercleuch on 8 October 2009

== See also ==
- List of places in the Scottish Borders
- List of places in Scotland
