= Wauchope, Scottish Borders =

Village in Scottish Borders, Scotland

Coordinates: 55°22′04″N 2°39′38″W

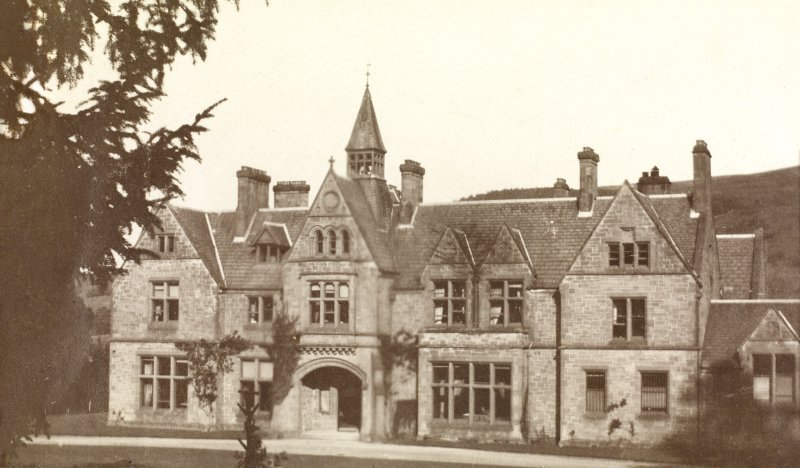
Wauchope, Scottish Borders demolished 1932

Wauchope (/ˈwɒxəp/ WOKH-əp) is a hamlet in the Scottish Borders council area of Scotland, near Southdean.

Wauchope House was demolished in 1932.

== See also ==
- Wauchope Forest
- List of places in the Scottish Borders
- List of places in Scotland
