= Hare and Dunhog Mosses =

Nature reserve near Selkirk, in the Scottish Borders area of Scotland

Hare and Dunhog Mosses is a nature reserve near Selkirk, in the Scottish Borders area of Scotland, in the former Selkirkshire.

== Locations ==
- Hare Moss (55.5132°N 2.8449°W)
- Dunhog Moss (55.5132°N 2.8350°W)

== See also ==
- List of Sites of Special Scientific Interest in Berwickshire and Roxburgh
- List of Sites of Special Scientific Interest in Tweeddale and Ettrick and Lauderdale
- List of places in the Scottish Borders
- List of places in Scotland
