= Chirnside Parish Church =

Kirk of the Church of Scotland

Coordinates: 55.7973°N 2.2095°W

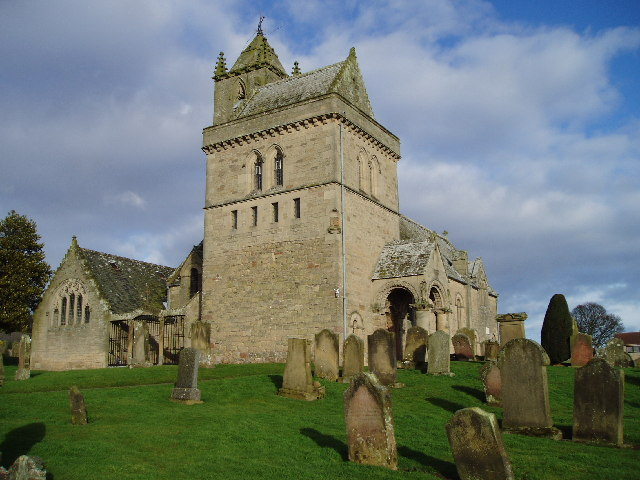
Chirnside Kirk

Chirnside Parish Church is a kirk of the Church of Scotland. It is situated on the B6355 road between Duns and Eyemouth in the old county of Berwickshire, now part of the Scottish Borders, at grid reference NT869560. The town of Chirnside is 6 miles (9.7 km) east of Duns, and 9 miles (14 km) north-west of Berwick-upon-Tweed. Jim Clark (Racing Driver) is also buried here.

== History ==
The first records of Chirnside and its church came in the early 12th century during the reign of King Edgar of Scotland (1097–1107), in a charter granting the lands and church to the monks of Durham. The 12th-century church was known as Ecclesia de Chirnyside and it was valued at 50 merks.

The first church at Chirnside was a plain rectangular building with a thatched roof and earthen floor. The altar dominated the east end and a priest would conduct daily mass, probably from a pulpit near the altar.

The Ecclesia de Chirnyside was dedicated, like many other church establishments in the area, by David de Bernham, Bishop of St Andrews, on 13 April 1242. In 1524 a young man named Luke Acheson, who lived in the village, was keeping watch from the tower of the church, and was killed by six English freebooters.

== Post Reformation ==
It would appear the old church was badly damaged at the Reformation as the body of the church was extensively repaired in 1573, and the first minister of the new reformed faith was not installed until that year (see list of early ministers). In 1581, during the reign of King James VI of Scotland, the church was mentioned in a national list of Presbyteries.

There was further extensive renewal in 1757, and a new manse was built for the minister. A wall on the western tower was retained in the renovations, with an engraved plate declaring "Helpe the pyr" (Help the poor) and the date 1573. A Norman archway was retained from the 12th-century church.

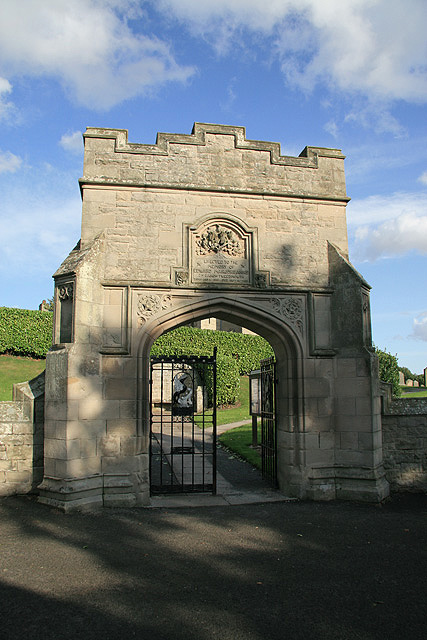
Tweedmouth Memorial Gateway

In 1904, following the death of Lady Tweedmouth and her burial at the west end of the church, her husband, Edward Marjoribanks, 2nd Baron Tweedmouth completely reshaped the interior of the church. He built a hall, a new vestry and added a new tower. Following the Baron's death, his son erected a memorial gateway in memory of his father.

The already united churches of Free Church and United Free Church, joined the Church of Scotland kirk in 1929. The North Church closed in 1973 but reopened in 1984 as a community centre. The United Presbyterian Church of Scotland building was demolished in 1982. Chirnside Parish Church is a category B listed building. World Champion Formula One driver Jim Clark (1936–1968) was buried in Chirnside Kirkyard, after his death in April 1968 at the Hockenheimring in Germany.

=== List of Post-Reformation ministers ===
- 1573 John Hume
- 1577 Robert Denholm
- 1583 John Douglas
- 1607 Alexander Smith

== See also ==
- List of places in the Scottish Borders
- List of places in East Lothian
- List of places in Edinburgh
- List of places in Midlothian
- List of places in West Lothian
- List of places in Scotland
