= Bothwell Water =

River in Scottish Borders, Scotland

Coordinates: 55°51′N 2°30′W

The Bothwell Water is a river in the Scottish Borders area of Scotland. It rises in the Lammermuir Hills near Caldercleugh and continues past the Upper Monynut Forest, Crichness, Bothwell Hill, and the village of Bothwell, when it joins the Whiteadder Water.

== See also ==
- List of places in the Scottish Borders
- List of places in Scotland
