= Bowhill =

Bowhill may refer to:

People

- Frederick Bowhill (1880 – 1960), RAF Air Chief Marshal

Places

- Bowhill, Fife, near Kirkcaldy, Scotland
- Bowhill, Scottish Borders, near Selkirk, Scotland
- Bowhill House, a historic house near Bowhill at Selkirk in the Scottish Borders
- Bowhill, South Australia.
