= Legerwood Kirk =

Church in Berwickshire, Scotland

Coordinates: 55°40′53″N 2°38′55″W

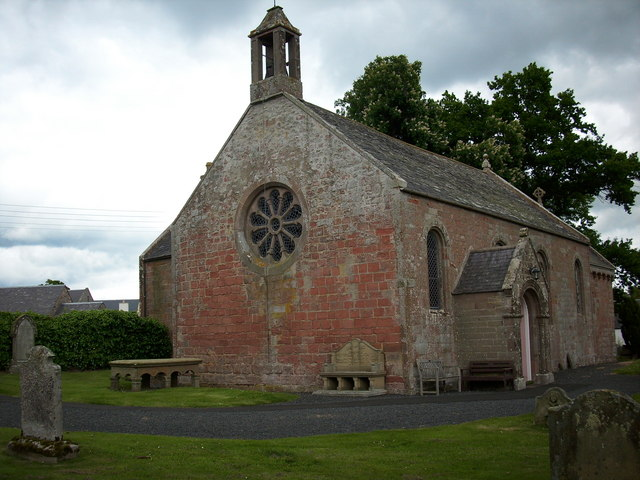
Legerwood Kirk

Legerwood Kirk is an ancient and historic Church of Scotland church in the former county of Berwickshire, Scotland. It is situated half a mile east of the hamlet of Legerwood and 6.5 miles (10.5 km) south east of Lauder in the Scottish Borders, on an unclassified road east of the A68 highway at grid reference NT593433. The parish church at Legerwood serves a wholly agricultural community and there are barely any clusters of houses worthy of being known as a village.

== History ==
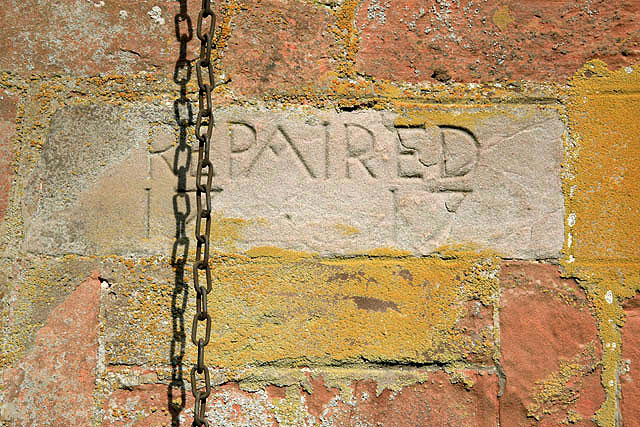
A datestone at the kirk

There has been a religious establishment at Legerwood since, at least, 1127 as John, a priest at Ledgaresude, as it was known, was a witness to a charter of that year. Walter de Lauder granted the church to the monks of Paisley Abbey in 1164 and they held the church and its tithes until the coming of the reformed church in Scotland in 1560. There is more mention of Legerwood in 1296 when the vicar, Walter, swore fealty to Edward I of England in 1296 at Berwick-upon-Tweed. The church still retains its original Norman chancel.

== Noted minister ==
The Reverend William Calderwood was minister at Legerwood from 1655 to 1709 but was evicted from his charge for 27 years for his refusal to conform to the Act of Glasgow – failure to preach with the Episcopalian prayer book as advocated by the Stuart kings in London Charles I and Charles II. William Calderwood died in 1709. In 1684 the congregation of Legerwood were fined for attending Conventicles. The minister's manse was not built until 1812.

== See also ==
- List of places in the Scottish Borders
