= Bowhill, Scottish Borders =

Village in Scottish Borders, Scotland

Coordinates: 55°32′N 2°54′W

Bowhill is a village off the A708, in the Scottish Borders area of Scotland, near Selkirk, by the Yarrow Water

Other places nearby include Bowhill House, Boleside, Broadmeadows, Ettrickbridge, Kirkhope.

== Climate ==
Climate data for Bowhill: 168 m (551 ft) 1991–2020 normals, extremes 1960–2019
| Month | Jan | Feb | Mar | Apr | May | Jun | Jul | Aug | Sep | Oct | Nov | Dec | Year |
|---|---|---|---|---|---|---|---|---|---|---|---|---|---|
| Record high °C (°F) | 13.2 (55.8) | 14.9 (58.8) | 22.2 (72.0) | 25.7 (78.3) | 27.5 (81.5) | 30.3 (86.5) | 31.3 (88.3) | 30.1 (86.2) | 25.8 (78.4) | 22.2 (72.0) | 16.0 (60.8) | 14.1 (57.4) | 31.3 (88.3) |
| Mean daily maximum °C (°F) | 5.8 (42.4) | 6.5 (43.7) | 8.8 (47.8) | 11.8 (53.2) | 15.0 (59.0) | 17.5 (63.5) | 19.4 (66.9) | 18.7 (65.7) | 16.0 (60.8) | 11.9 (53.4) | 8.4 (47.1) | 6.0 (42.8) | 12.2 (53.9) |
| Daily mean °C (°F) | 3.1 (37.6) | 3.5 (38.3) | 5.3 (41.5) | 7.6 (45.7) | 10.3 (50.5) | 13.1 (55.6) | 14.9 (58.8) | 14.5 (58.1) | 12.2 (54.0) | 8.7 (47.7) | 5.5 (41.9) | 3.2 (37.8) | 8.5 (47.3) |
| Mean daily minimum °C (°F) | 0.3 (32.5) | 0.5 (32.9) | 1.6 (34.9) | 3.3 (37.9) | 5.6 (42.1) | 8.7 (47.7) | 10.4 (50.7) | 10.2 (50.4) | 8.3 (46.9) | 5.4 (41.7) | 2.5 (36.5) | 0.3 (32.5) | 4.8 (40.6) |
| Record low °C (°F) | −26.6 (−15.9) | −17.2 (1.0) | −15.0 (5.0) | −6.1 (21.0) | −4.4 (24.1) | −1.7 (28.9) | 1.1 (34.0) | −0.5 (31.1) | −2.3 (27.9) | −6.1 (21.0) | −11.1 (12.0) | −16.4 (2.5) | −26.6 (−15.9) |
| Average precipitation mm (inches) | 103.1 (4.06) | 75.5 (2.97) | 66.2 (2.61) | 61.5 (2.42) | 61.4 (2.42) | 65.9 (2.59) | 70.7 (2.78) | 78.5 (3.09) | 66.5 (2.62) | 98.3 (3.87) | 99.5 (3.92) | 108.3 (4.26) | 955.4 (37.61) |
| Average precipitation days | 15.7 | 12.1 | 12.1 | 12.1 | 11.0 | 10.8 | 11.6 | 11.7 | 11.4 | 14.0 | 15.6 | 14.8 | 153.0 |
Source 1: Météo Climat
Source 2: KNMI (extremes)

== Notable people ==
- Lord Henry Scott (1868–1945), cricketer and British Army soldier

== See also ==
- List of places in the Scottish Borders
- List of places in Scotland
