= Allanshaugh =

Village in Scottish Borders

Coordinates: 55.73°N 02.90°W

- Location within the Scottish Borders
- OS grid reference: NT4349
- Council area: Scottish Borders
- Country: Scotland
- Sovereign state: United Kingdom
- Police: Scotland
- Fire: Scottish
- Ambulance: Scottish
- UK Parliament: Berwickshire, Roxburgh and Selkirk
- Scottish Parliament: Midlothian South, Tweeddale and Lauderdale

Allanshaugh is a fermtoun in the Scottish Borders area of Scotland.

== See also ==
- List of places in the Scottish Borders
- List of places in Scotland

== Gallery ==
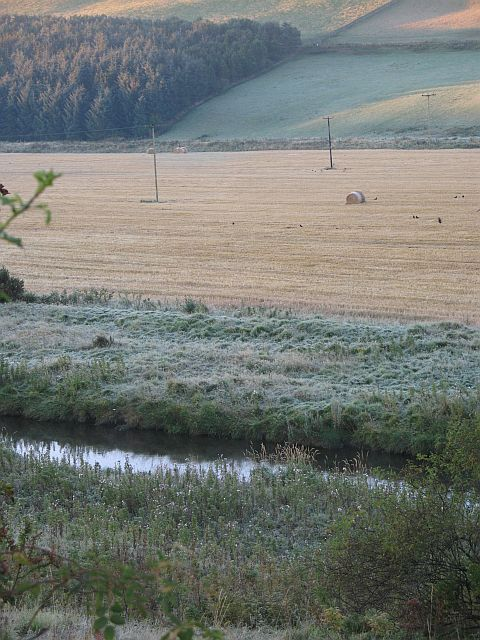
The Gala Water at Allanshaugh
