= Blackcastle Rings =

Coordinates: 55.7232°N 2.4891°W

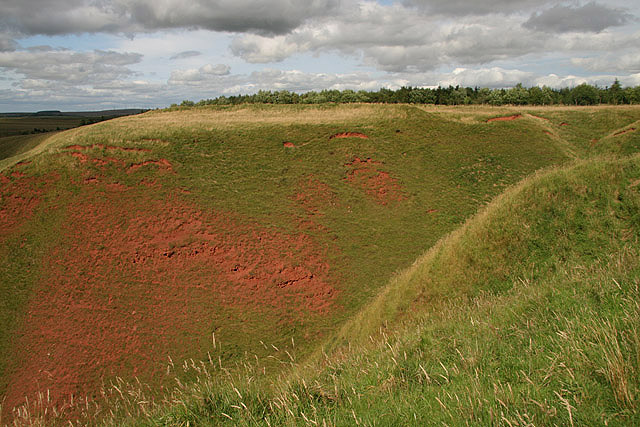
A view over Deil's Neuk to the ancient earthworks

The Blackcastle Rings are earthworks and a promontory fort in the Parish of Greenlaw, above the left bank of the Blackadder Water, in the Scottish Borders area of Scotland.

== See also ==
- List of hill forts in Scotland
- List of places in the Scottish Borders
- List of places in Scotland
