= Dirrington Great Law =

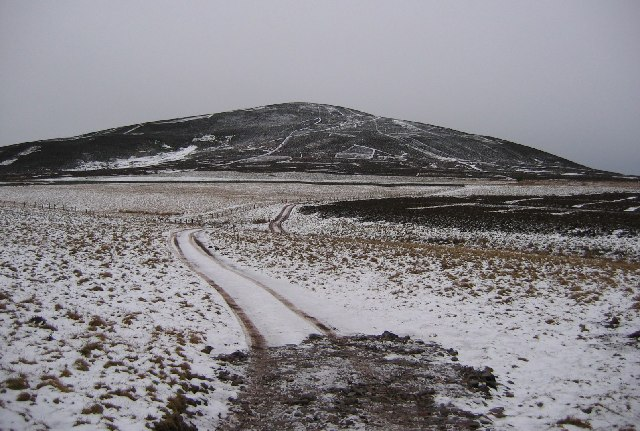
- Dirrington Great Law

Highest point
- Elevation: 398 metres (1,306 ft)
- Prominence: 157 metres (515 ft)
- Listing: Marilyn
- Coordinates: 55.7867°N 2.4826°W

Geography
- Location: Scottish Borders
- OS grid: NT698549

Dirrington Great Law is a hill in the Scottish Borders area of Scotland, in the former county of Berwickshire. The summit is around 2.5 kilometres (1.6 mi) south of Longformacus and 9 kilometres (5.6 mi) west of Duns. It is an isolated hill to the south of the Lammermuir Plateau. Dirrington Little Law (360 metres (1,180 ft)) is located 2 kilometres (1.2 mi) to the south-west.

Geologically, the two Dirrington Laws comprise Carboniferous volcanic felsite (riebeckite), and may be the remains of a laccolith, a type of volcanic intrusion into the surrounding sedimentary rocks of the Old Red Sandstone.

At the summit of Dirrington Great Law are three large circular cairns, 23.5 metres (77 ft), 21 metres (69 ft), and 8.5 metres (28 ft) in diameter. The cairns are composed of stones excavated from the hilltop, rather than from loose stone gathered from the ground.

== See also ==
- List of places in the Scottish Borders
