= Baddinsgill Reservoir =

Reservoir in the Scottish Borders, Scotland

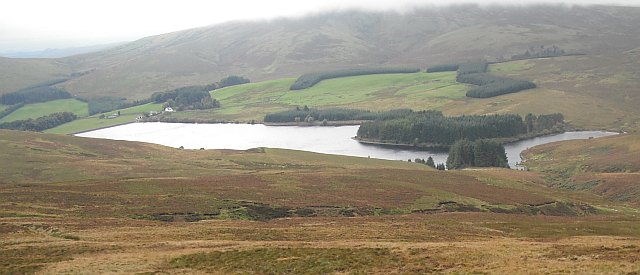
- Baddinsgill Reservoir

- Location within Scotland
- Location: Scotland
- Coordinates: 55°47′16″N 3°23′27″W
- Type: reservoir
- Primary inflows: Lyne Water
- Primary outflows: Lyne Water
- Basin countries: United Kingdom
- Surface area: 23.7 hectares (59 acres)

Baddinsgill Reservoir is a small reservoir in the Scottish Borders area of Scotland close to Carlops, West Linton, and the boundary with Midlothian. It is close to Baddinsgill House. The Lyne Water is dammed to form the reservoir, not the Baddinsgill Burn, which joins the Lyne Water further south, below the reservoir. The earth dam was faced with concrete blocks. In time these eroded and they were capped with 100 millimetres (3.9 in) of tarmac.

== See also ==
- List of places in the Scottish Borders
- List of reservoirs and dams in the United Kingdom
- List of places in Scotland
- Fruid Reservoir
- Megget Reservoir
- Talla Reservoir
- Westwater Reservoir
