= Press Castle =

Village in Scottish Borders, Scotland, UK

Coordinates: 55.88155°N 2.20765°W

Press Castle is a village with 17th-century manor house and country estate in the Scottish Borders, 2m (3 km) west of Coldingham, by the Ale Water. NT871654.

The area is renowned for its colonies of red squirrels.

== See also ==
- List of places in the Scottish Borders

== Gallery ==
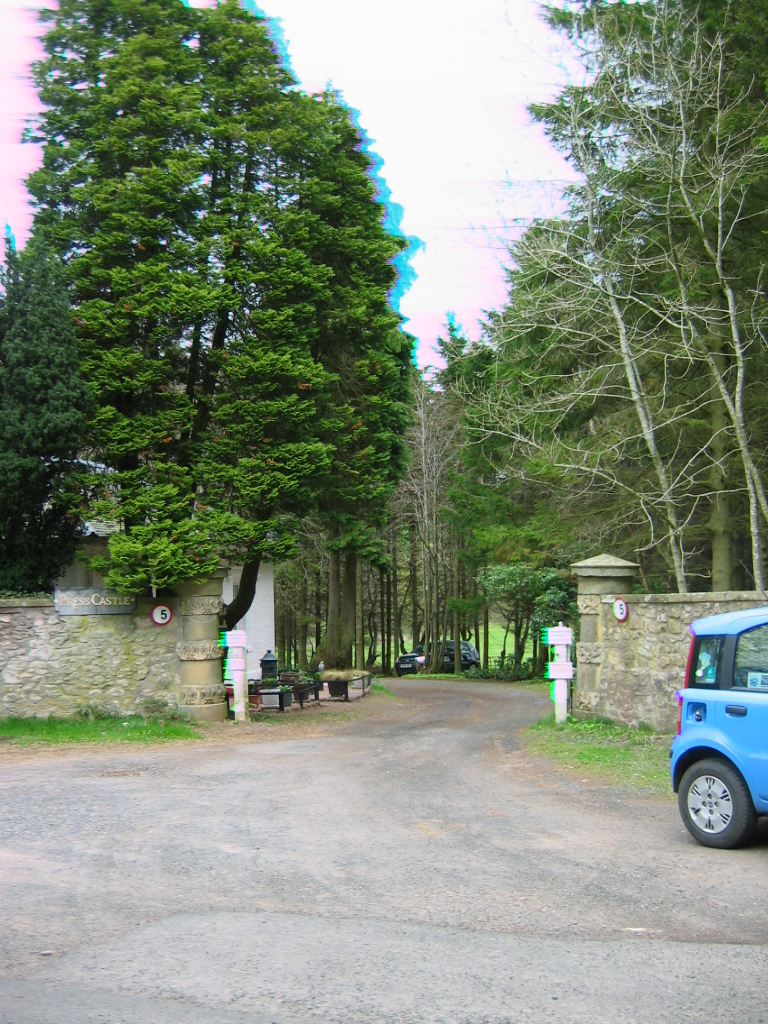
Press Castle

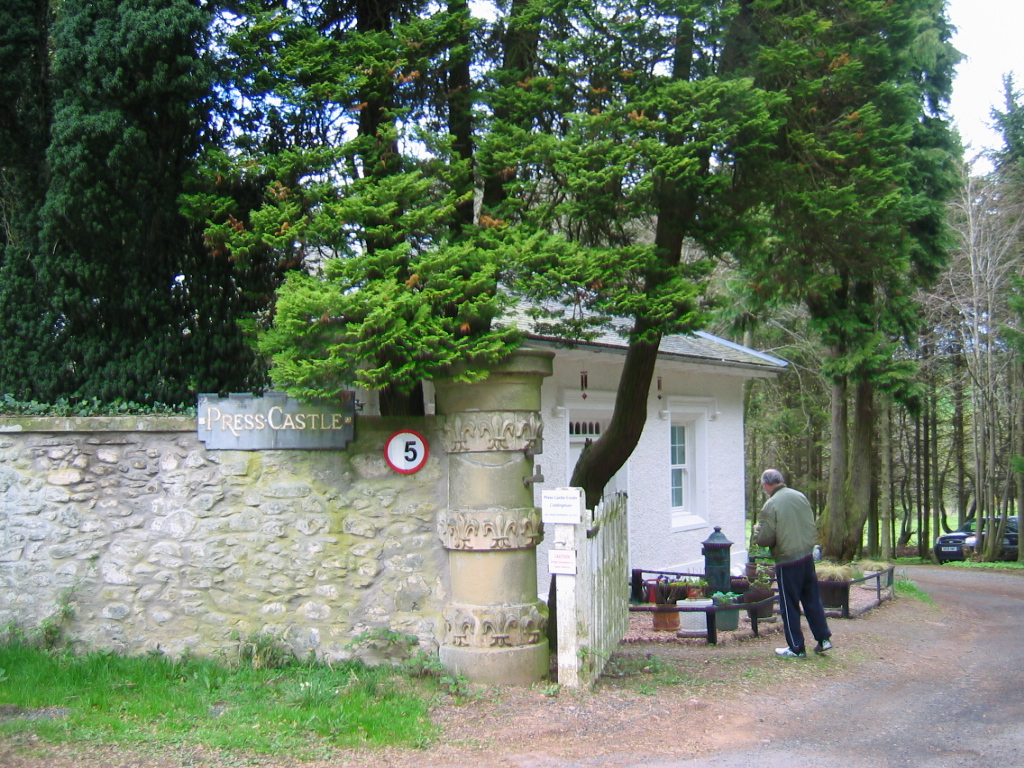
Press Castle Lodge

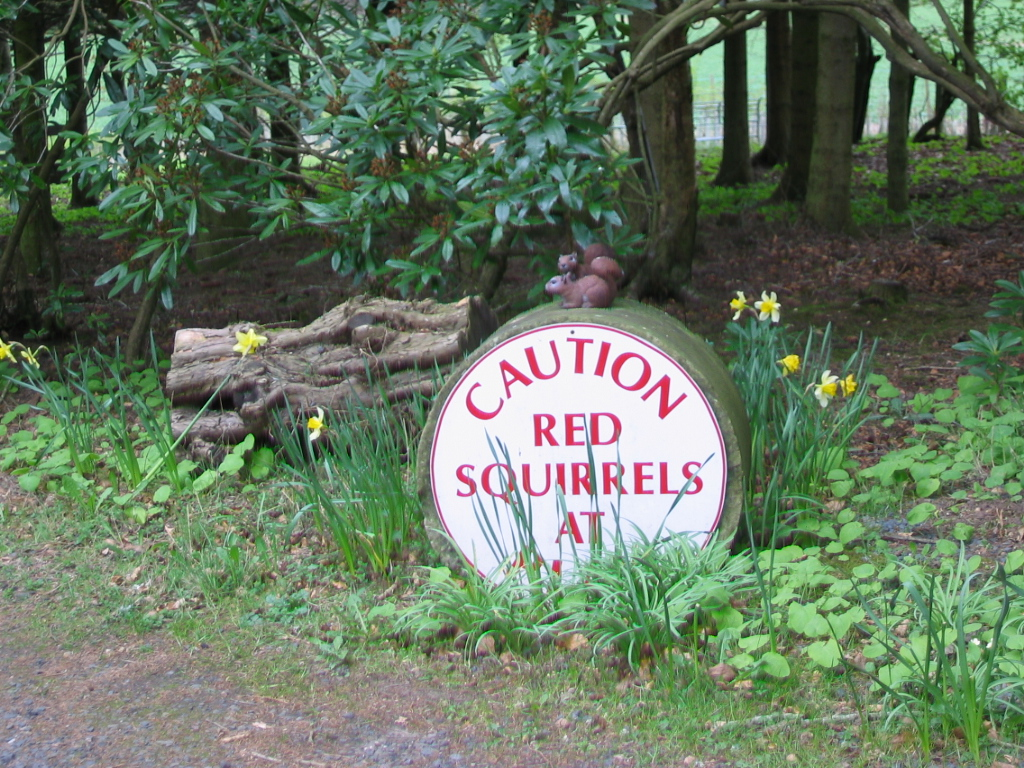
Red squirrels at Press Castle

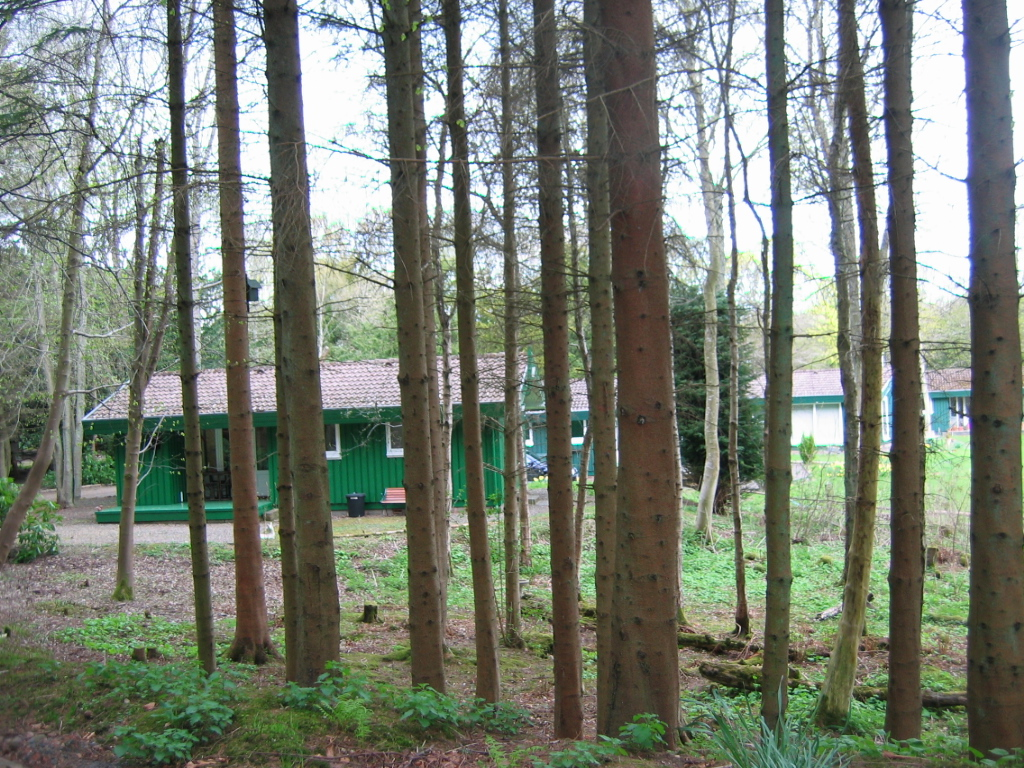
Lodges at Press Castle
