= Peebles Old Parish Church =

Parish church in Scotland

Coordinates: 55°39′4.46″N 3°11′33.1″W

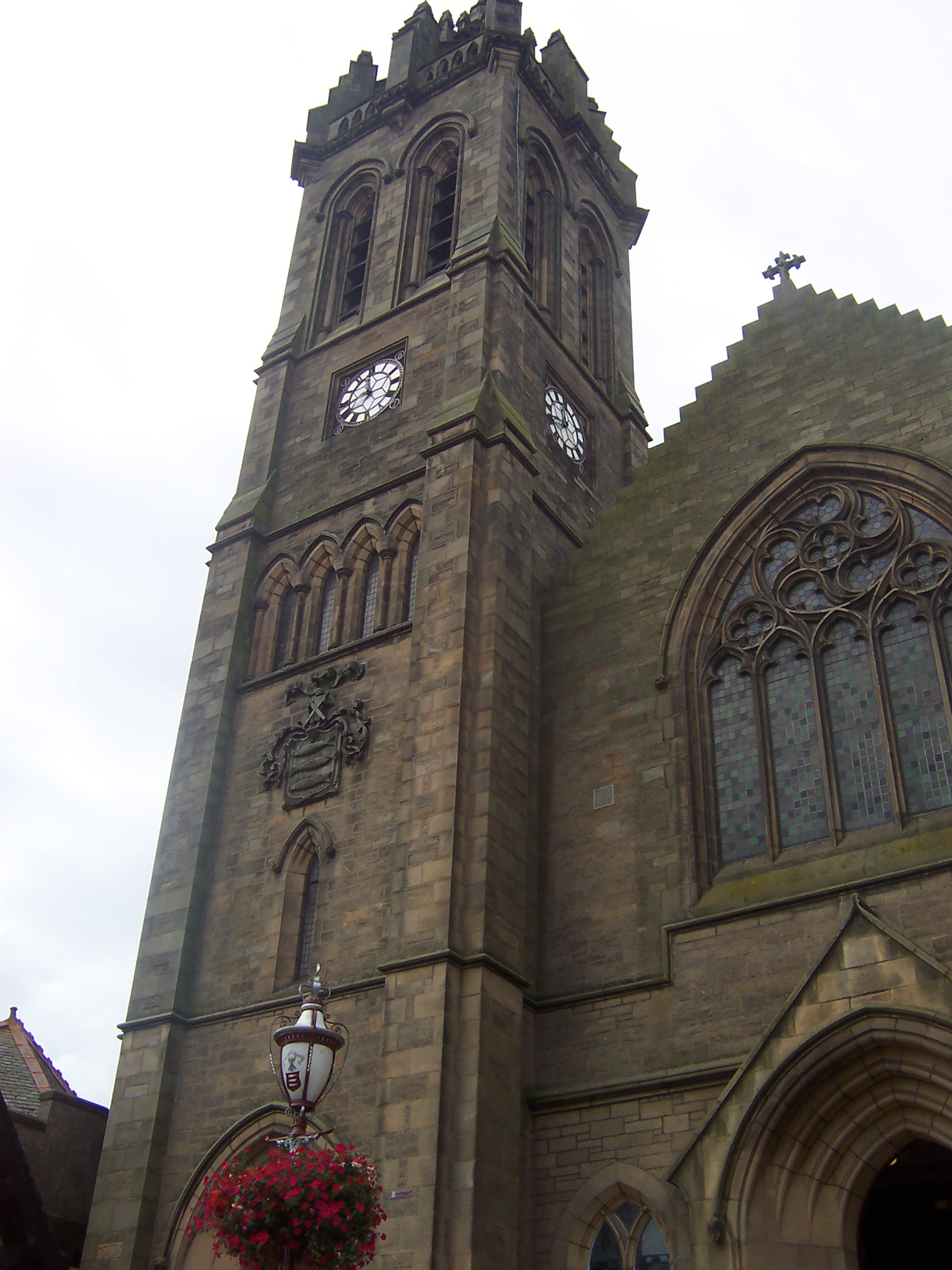
The Clock Tower of the Old Parish Church of Peebles

The Old Parish Church of Peebles is one of several Christian churches in Peebles, Borders, Scotland. It is a congregation of the Church of Scotland. Dedicated on 29 March 1887, it lies at the end of the High Street.

The church was constructed between 1885 and 1887 at a cost of £9,500. It includes some features from an earlier parish church built on the site in 1784. The architect was William Young of London who designed the church in a Gothic style.

The church is a member of Peebles Churches Together.
