= Watch Water =

River in Scottish Borders, Scotland

Coordinates: 55°48′00″N 2°32′32″W

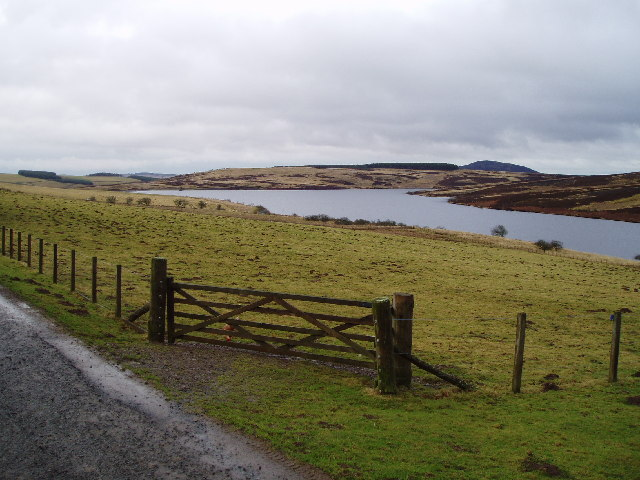
Watch Water Reservoir in the Lammermuir Hills

The Watch Water is a river in the Scottish Borders area of Scotland. It rises in the Lammermuir Hills, around 8 kilometres (5.0 mi) west of Longformacus, and flows generally eastward to its confluence with the Dye Water, around 700 metres (2,300 ft) west of Longformacus. The Dye Water flows into the Whiteadder Water, which in turn is a tributary of the River Tweed.

== Watch Water Reservoir ==
Watch Water Reservoir is a man-made reservoir, located approximately halfway along the river's course, around 3 kilometres (1.9 mi) from Longformacus and 12 kilometres (7.5 mi) from Duns. It extends to 49 hectares (120 acres), and is formed by an earthen dam. The Southern Upland Way, a Long Distance Route which runs across southern Scotland, skirts the northern edge of the reservoir, and the Sir Walter Scott Way from Moffat to Cockburnspath also passes by it. The partial ruins of a peel tower survive as part of Old Scarlaw Cottage, also on the northern edge of the reservoir.

== John Dippie's Well ==
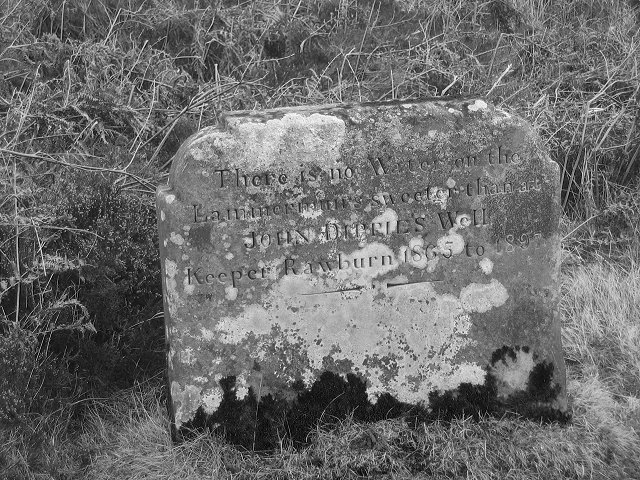
John Dippie's Well, near Twinlaw Ford where the Southern Upland Way crosses the Watch Water

Close to where the Southern Upland Way crosses the Watch Water is John Dippie's Well. This natural spring is marked by a carved stone erected in 1869, inscribed "There is no water in the Lammermuirs sweeter than that at John Dippie’s Well." The remains of an 18th-century farmstead, traditionally the home of the well's keeper, are nearby.

The reason for the sweetness of the water, according to family sources, was that John would go ahead of his shooting party to add some whisky to the water.

== See also ==
- List of places in the Scottish Borders
