= Garvald, South Lanarkshire =

Village in South Lanarkshire, Scotland, UK

Coordinates: 55°43′42″N 3°26′16″W

Garvald (Scottish Gaelic: An Garbh Allt, meaning the rough burn) is a small settlement on the boundary between the Scottish Borders and South Lanarkshire, Scotland.

Garvald home farm is a community farm and residential social enterprise site established in 1987 for adults, some with learning difficulties and managed by the Garvald Trust.

The area has a former sand and gravel quarry that is now restored for other uses.

== See also ==
- Garvald, East Lothian
- Garvald, Scottish Borders
- The geographic coordinates are from the Ordnance Survey.
