= List of places in the Tayside region of Scotland =

The following is a list of places in the Tayside region of Scotland.

== A ==
- Aberfeldy
- Alyth
- Arbroath
- Auchterarder

== B ==
- Balnaboth
- Birnim
- Blairgowrie
- Brechin
- Bridge of Cally

== C ==
- Carnoustie
- Comrie
- Crieff

== D ==
- Dundee
- Dunkeld

== E ==
- Edzell

== F ==
- Ferryden by Montrose
- Forfar

== G ==
- Glencarse
- Glendoick
- Glenfarg

== K ==
- Kinloch Rannoch
- Kinross
- Kirriemuir

== L ==
- Letham

== M ==
- Monifieth
- Monikie
- Montrose

== P ==
- Perth
- Pitlochry
