= Craigierig =

Village in Scottish Borders, Scotland

Coordinates: 55.498°N 3.256°W

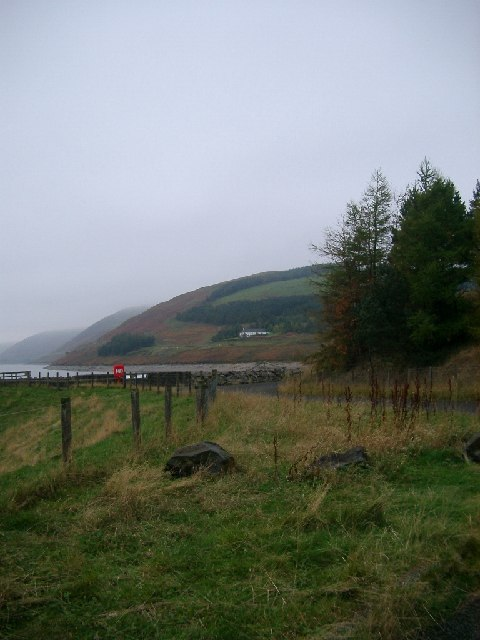
Craigierig on the Megget Reservoir

Craigierig is a village on the Megget Reservoir, in the Scottish Borders area of Scotland, in the former Selkirkshire.

Places nearby include the Glengaber Burn, Henderland, St Mary's Loch, the Tibbie Shiels Inn, and Yarrow Water.

== See also ==
- List of places in the Scottish Borders
- List of places in Scotland
