= Leithen Water =

River in Scottish Borders, Scotland

Coordinates: 55°37′N 3°04′W

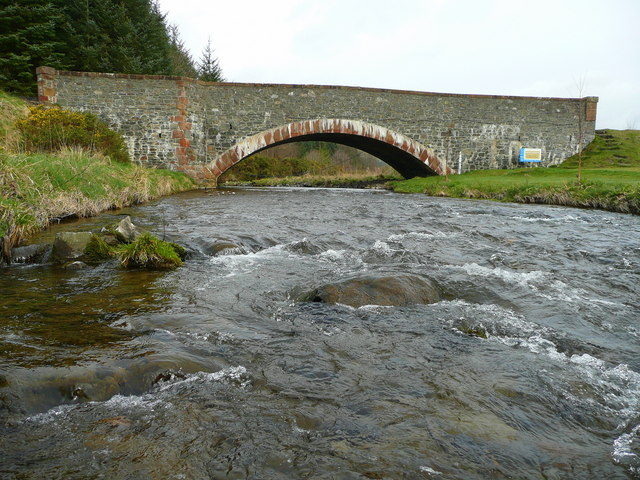
- Native name: Leithean (Scottish Gaelic)

Physical characteristics
- Length: 18 km (11 mi)
- Basin size: 57 km^{2} (22 sq mi)

Basin features
- Tributaries
  - left: Craighope Burn; Williamslee Burn; Glentress Water; Glentress Burn

Leithen Water (Scottish Gaelic: Leithean or Abhainn Leithean) is a tributary of the River Tweed in Scotland. It rises in the Moorfoot Hills and joins the Tweed at the south end of the town of Innerleithen, whose name comes from the Scottish Gaelic inbhir, meaning a confluence, and anglicised as "inner" or "inver". The Brythonic equivalent is "Aber". "Leithen" is a Celtic name meaning grey in colour (cf. Welsh llwydion).

In Innerleithen the river is about 6–7 metres across and is not deep enough to swim. Leithen Water is a local favourite for the children who wade, 'guddle' fish (catch fish with hands) and play about in it. In the summer months, local children build small dams to deepen it to facilitate swimming, especially at the Cauld (a fish ladder near Innerleithen Golf Course) and at Leithen Bridge. The latter is an old stone bridge, erected in 1799 using funds from a stipend, to enable easy access for townsfolk to attend church on the west side of the Leithen Water.

The river flooded in 1949, 2002, and 2005.

Leithen Water is usually cool and clear, however following heavy rain it can become quite murky.

The river lends its name to the character Sir Edward Leithen in a number of novels by John Buchan.
