= List of places in Scotland =

This list of places in Scotland is a complete collection of lists of places in Scotland.

- List of burghs in Scotland
- List of census localities in Scotland
- List of islands of Scotland
  - List of Shetland islands
  - List of Orkney islands
  - List of Inner Hebrides
  - List of Outer Hebrides
  - List of outlying islands of Scotland
  - List of freshwater islands in Scotland
- List of rivers of Scotland
- List of lochs in Scotland
- Waterfalls of Scotland
- List of Munros
- Extreme points of Scotland

== Lists of places within Scottish local authorities ==
- List of places in Aberdeen
- List of places in Aberdeenshire
- List of places in Angus
- List of places in Argyll and Bute
- List of places in Clackmannanshire
- List of places in Dumfries and Galloway
- List of places in Dundee
- List of places in East Ayrshire
- List of places in East Dunbartonshire
- List of places in East Lothian
- List of places in East Renfrewshire
- List of places in na h-Eileanan Siar (Western Isles)
- List of places in Edinburgh
- List of places in Falkirk (council area)
- List of places in Fife
- List of places in Glasgow
- List of places in Highland
- List of places in Inverclyde
- List of places in Midlothian
- List of places in Moray
- List of places in North Ayrshire
- List of places in North Lanarkshire
- List of places in Orkney
- List of places in Perth and Kinross
- List of places in Renfrewshire
- List of places in the Scottish Borders
- List of places in Shetland
- List of places in South Ayrshire
- List of places in South Lanarkshire
- List of places in Stirling (district)
- List of places in the Tayside region of Scotland (historical region)
- List of places in West Dunbartonshire
- List of places in West Lothian

== See also ==
- Scottish toponymy
- Counties of Scotland
- Lieutenancy areas of Scotland
- List of generic forms in British place names
- Subdivisions of Scotland
- United Nations Group of Experts on Geographical Names
- Shieling
