= List of castles in the Scottish Borders =

This is a list of castles in the Scottish Borders in Scotland.

== List ==
Name	Type	Date	Condition	Ownership	Location	Notes	Picture
Ayton Castle			Occupied		NT9291061382		
Billie Castle	Courtyard castle		Ruin		NT85065964		
Borthwick Castle	L-plan castle		Site		Near Duns		
Branxholme Castle	Tower house		Occupied		NT4643711647		
Cessford Castle			Ruin		NT7394523849		
Corsbie Castle		16th century	Ruin		Near Gordon, Scottish Borders		
Cranshaws Tower			Occupied				
Cavers Castle	Tower	1200	Ruin				
Drochil Castle			Ruin		NT1619943506		
Dryhope Tower			Ruin		NT2673524732		
Duns Castle			Occupied		NT7778154380		
Edrington Castle			Ruin		NT9412153399		
Evelaw Tower	L-plan	16th century	Ruin				
Fast Castle	courtyard castle		Ruin	Hall family open: free	Coldingham; NT860709		
Fatlips Castle			Undergoing restoration		NT5819120887		
Ferniehirst Castle			Occupied		NT6524317981		
Floors Castle	house	1721	Occupied	Duke of Roxburghe	Kelso; NT7110634681	ruins of Roxburgh castle in the grounds	
Fulton Tower	L-plan castle	16th century	Ruin				
Greenknowe Tower			Ruin		NT639428		
Hermitage Castle	keep		Ruin	Historic Scotland	Newcastleton; NY495960		
Hume Castle			Ruin		Greenlaw; NT7047541399		
Jedburgh Castle			demolished 1409		Jedburgh; NT6476920180	Replaced by a baronial-style jail	
Kirkhope Tower			Occupied		NT3788125055		
Lamberton Castle			No remains				
Lanton Tower	Tower House	16th century	Occupied		55.485938°N 2.605958°W		
Lauder Tower	Tower House	15th century	No remains				
Mangerton Tower	Tower House	16th century	Ruin				
Mervinslaw Pele	Pele tower		Ruin				
Muircleuch Tower			Ruins				
Neidpath Castle	keep	14th century	Semi-ruinous	private ownership; open regularly	Peebles; NT236405	Extensively remodelled in 16th century	
Newark Castle			Ruin		NT4215029450		
Nisbet House	House	1630	Restoration	Private	Duns; NT7950551230	West Tower added 1774	
Old Lauder Castle		11th Century	No remains				
Old Thirlestane Castle			Ruins				
Peebles Castle		12th century	No remains		Peebles; NT2500040398		
Posso Tower		16th century	Ruin		NT2001433243		
Roxburgh Castle			Ruin		NT7132033735		
Smailholm Tower				Historic Scotland	NT637346		
Thirlestane Castle			Occupied		NT5338847926		
Traquair House	fortified house		occupied	private ownership; open regularly	NT3307635483		Traquair House in 1814
Tushielaw Tower	Tower house	16th century	Ruin		NT3002617192		
Venlaw			Occupied		NT2528041238		
Wallace's Tower	L-plan castle	16th century	Ruin		NT7001630477		
Wedderburn Castle			Occupied		NT8083852853		
Whitslaid Tower			Ruin		NT5576244563		

== See also ==
- Castles in Scotland
- List of castles in Scotland
- List of listed buildings in the Scottish Borders
