= Scheduled monuments in the Scottish Borders =

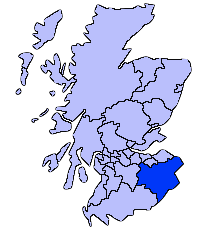
Scottish Borders shown within Scotland

A scheduled monument in Scotland is a nationally important archaeological site or monument which is given legal protection by being placed on a list (or "schedule") maintained by Historic Environment Scotland. The aim of scheduling is to preserve the country's most significant sites and monuments as far as possible in the form in which they have been inherited.

The process of scheduling is governed by the Ancient Monuments and Archaeological Areas Act 1979, which aims "to make provision for the investigation, preservation and recording of matters of archaeological or historical interest". The term "scheduled monument" can apply to the whole range of archaeological sites which have been deliberately constructed by human activity but are not always visible above ground. They range from prehistoric standing stones and burial sites, through Roman remains and medieval structures such as castles and monasteries, to later structures such as industrial sites and buildings constructed for the World Wars. Some buildings or structures which were both scheduled and listed have had their listing designations removed to reduce the duplication.

In 2017 there were 8,238 scheduled monuments in Scotland.

== Notable Scheduled Monuments in the Scottish Borders ==
Name	Location	Description	Ref No	Image
White Meldon	Peebles	Prehistoric hill fort	SM114	
Old Bonkyl Kirk	Bunkle and Preston	Remains, especially the apse, of late medieval parish church	SM381	
St Helen's Kirk, Cockburnspath	Cockburnspath	Ruined Norman church	SM382	
Coldingham Priory cloisters	Coldingham	Remains of medieval cloisters	SM383	
Hume Castle	Hume	Late 12th- or early 13th-century castle of enceinte	SM387	
Drochil Castle	Newlands	Large unfinished ruined castle	SM1495	
Northshield Rings	Eddleston	Prehistoric hill fort	SM731	
Yarrow Stone	Yarrow	Inscribed stone	SM1727	
Kirkhope Tower	Kirkhope	Tower and barmkin	SM1728	
Newark Castle	Selkirk	Large, ruined tower house in grounds of Bowhill House	SM1729	
Bonkyll Castle	Bunkle and Preston	Traces of medieval fortress	SM2407	
Milkieston Rings	Eddleston	Prehistoric hill fort	SM2416	
Torwoodlee Broch	Caddonfoot	Prehistoric broch	SM2448	
Black Meldon	Peebles	Prehistoric hill fort	SM2703	
Stow Old Bridge	Stow	Old bridge	SM2855	
Fatlips Castle	Minto	Renovated Pele tower	SM2881	
Dreva Craig	Stobo	Prehistoric hill fort	SM2895	
Soutra Aisle	Fala	Remains of a medieval hospital including a rebuilt portion of the associated church	SM3067	
Old Thirlestane Castle	Lauder	Remains of 13th- to 15th-century castle	SM4035	
Blanerne Castle	Bunkle and Preston	Remains of a 16th-century fortified residence	SM4216	
Fast Castle	Coldingham	Ruined remains of coastal fortress	SM4328	
Dryhope Tower	Yarrow	Remains of a medieval tower house	SM6161	
Horsburgh Castle	Innerleithen	Remains of late medieval tower-house	SM6284	
Torwoodlee Tower	Caddonfoot	Remains of 17th-century tower-house	SM8687	
Jedburgh Abbey	Jedburgh	Augustinian Abbey founded as a priory around 1138	SM13126	
Greenknowe Tower	Gordon	Remains of L-plan tower-house	SM13590	
Dryburgh Abbey	Dryburgh	Ruined 12th-century abbey	SM90103	
Edin's Hall Broch	Duns	Prehistoric fort, broch and settlement	SM90134	
Foulden Old Tithe Barn	Foulden	18th-century tithe barn	SM90148	
Hermitage Castle	Castleton	Semi-ruined castle	SM90161	
Edrom Church Norman doorway	Edrom	Norman doorway to burial vault	SM90135	
Kelso Abbey	Kelso	12th-century Tironesian abbey	SM90177	
Melrose Abbey	Melrose	Ruined 14th- and 15th-century abbey	SM90214	
Wallace's Tower	Roxburgh	16th century tower house.	SM13812	

== See also ==
- List of Category A listed buildings in the Scottish Borders
