= List of listed buildings in Eddleston, Scottish Borders =

This is a list of listed buildings in the parish of Eddleston in the Scottish Borders, Scotland.

== List ==
Name	Location	Date Listed	Grid Ref. (Note: Sometimes known as OSGB36, the grid reference (where provided) is based on the British national grid reference system used by the Ordnance Survey. • "Guide to National Grid". Ordnance Survey. • "Get-a-map". Ordnance Survey.)	Geo-coordinates	Notes	LB Number (Note: Historic Environment Scotland assign a unique alphanumeric identifier to each designated site in Scotland, for listed buildings this always begins with "LB", for example "LB12345".)	Image
Cringletie House, Including Lodges, Walled Garden, Sundial And Dovecot				55°41′13″N 3°13′10″W	Category B	2035	Upload another image See more images
Harehope				55°41′04″N 3°16′25″W	Category B	2039	Upload Photo
Eddleston Bridge Eddleston				55°42′37″N 3°12′28″W	Category C(S)	2023	Upload another image
Portmore				55°43′37″N 3°11′42″W	Category A	2037	Upload another image
Summerhouse, Black Barony				55°42′47″N 3°13′10″W	Category B	2042	Upload another image
Eddleston Parish Church And Graveyard				55°42′44″N 3°12′18″W	Category B	2020	Upload another image See more images
Entrance Gateway And Lodge, Portmore				55°43′27″N 3°12′17″W	Category C(S)	2038	Upload another image
Moredun, And Adjoining 2 Cottages (Glen Nevis And Old School House)				55°42′45″N 3°12′21″W	Category B	2021	Upload Photo
Eddleston Village Nos. 1-23 And 2-22. Station Road				55°42′40″N 3°12′30″W	Category B	2022	Upload Photo
"Bellevue Temple" In Former Policies Of Black Barony				55°42′39″N 3°13′23″W	Category C(S)	2043	Upload another image
"The Horse Shoe Inn", Eddleston				55°42′44″N 3°12′23″W	Category C(S)	157	Upload another image
Black Barony Hotel				55°42′46″N 3°13′01″W	Category B	2040	Upload another image See more images
Ice House, Black Barony				55°42′49″N 3°12′59″W	Category B	2041	Upload another image

== Key ==
The scheme for classifying buildings in Scotland is:

- Category A: "buildings of national or international importance, either architectural or historic; or fine, little-altered examples of some particular period, style or building type."
- Category B: "buildings of regional or more than local importance; or major examples of some particular period, style or building type, which may have been altered."
- Category C: "buildings of local importance; lesser examples of any period, style, or building type, as originally constructed or moderately altered; and simple traditional buildings which group well with other listed buildings."

In March 2016 there were 47,288 listed buildings in Scotland. Of these, 8% were Category A, and 50% were Category B, with the remaining 42% being Category C.
