= Kirkhope Tower =

Castle in Scottish Borders, Scotland

- Ettrick Valley, Selkirkshire, Scotland
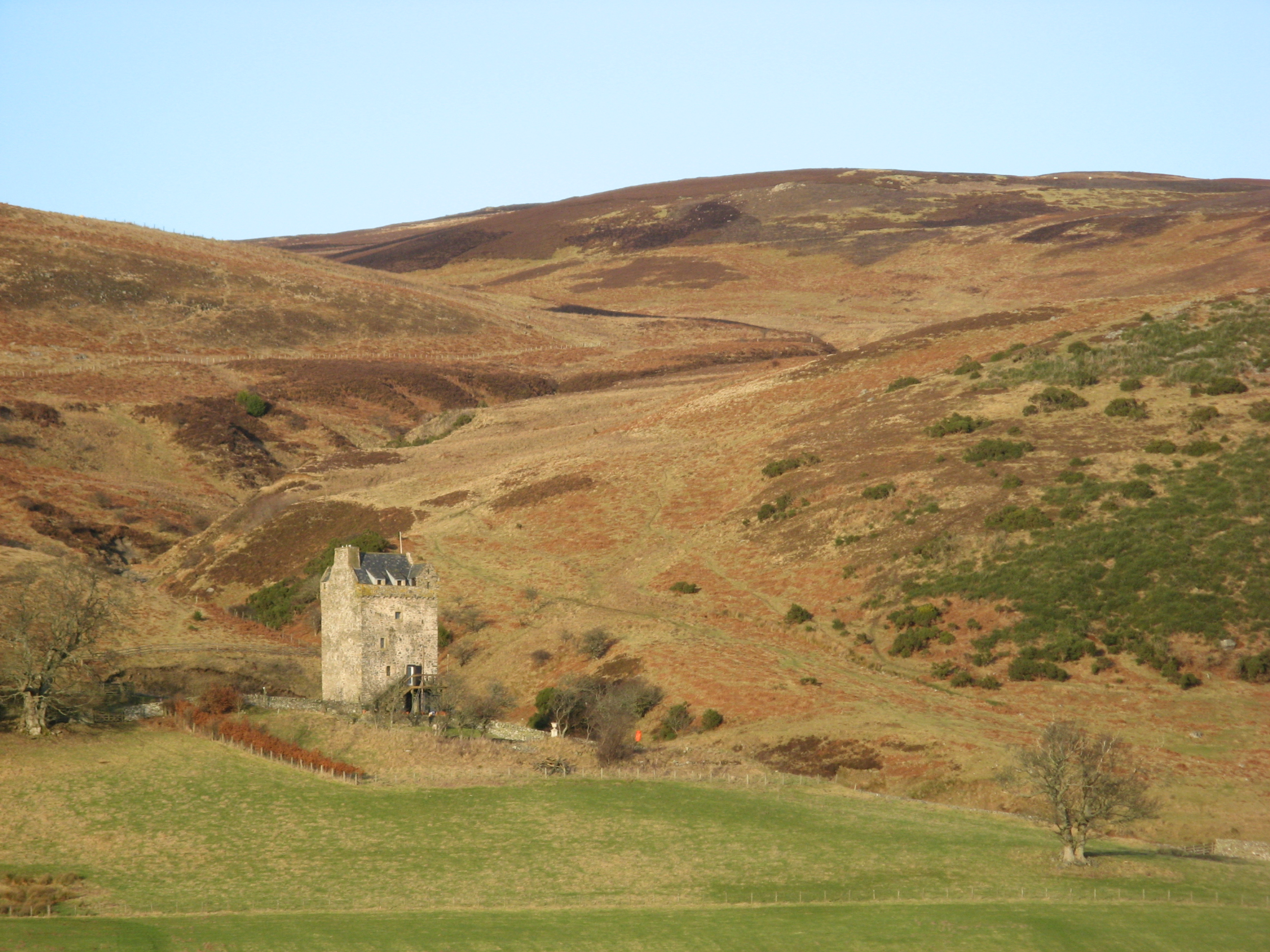
- Kirkhope Tower beneath Kirkhope Hill

Site information
- Type: Pele tower with Barmekin
- Owner: Private
- Open to the public: No
- Condition: Occupied as a residence

Location
- Coordinates: 55°30′55″N 2°59′07″W

Site history
- Built: early 16th century
- Built by: Walter Scott of Harden
- In use: 16th century to present
- Materials: Stone

Kirkhope Tower is a Scottish Pele, located in the Ettrick Valley, in the historic county of Selkirkshire, now a division of the Scottish Borders. The tower lies a mile to the north west of Ettrickbridge, and seven miles (11 km) from the Burgh of Selkirk.

== Construction ==
=== Overview ===
A remote and austere building, Kirkhope Tower is of a square footprint and constructed from local stone. It consists of four main floors and a garret floor above the parapet. Its small windows are constructed with simple relieving arches and stand with the exception of the light into the Ground floor at heights of over thirty feet. It stands on rough ground that slopes steeply away to the valley below.

=== Ground floor ===
The ground floor is of vaulted construction and is accessible through a small door that could be easily barricaded by use of an iron yett. The room was lit by an oblique light on the opposite wall to the entrance, affording no view or access to within the chamber from potential attackers. Access to the upper floors was by use of a timber staircase that leads from the left of the entrance to the northeast angle of the building.

=== First floor ===
The first floor of the Tower would have housed the original Hall of the tower with access to the above floors only to be gained by crossing the room to the turnpike in the south east angle. Adjacent to the turnpike is the main entrance to the building, which in times of war could be accessed by a wooden stair or ladder that could be retracted within, the door on the ground being firmly secured.

=== Second and third floors ===
These levels provided accommodation for the Laird and his family with timber floors joisted with oak dividing them.

=== Parapet and garret ===
There are two rectangular turrets in the northwest and southeast angles of the parapet, the latter of which acts of the cap-house for the turnpike staircase rising from below. There are walkways within the parapet to the North, South and East, the western gable being taken up by the flues for the Fireplaces in the floors below. The parapet is supported by simple Corbels. The addition of the covered turrets rather than simple Bartizans suggest a relatively late construction.

=== Exterior ===
There are remains of the Barmkin wall still extant. This originally formed a Bailey around the structure in which cattle and tenants could seek refuge in dangerous times.

== History ==
Although there are no records of its construction, Kirkhope was presumably constructed by the early part of the 16th century in accordance with an act of the Scottish Parliament, dated 1535 that required large landholders in the Borderlands to build barmkins of stone and lime, sixty square feet in area and with walls of one ell thickness and six ells in height "for the resett and defense of him, his tennents, and his gudis in troublous tyme". Furthermore "with ane toure in the samen for himself gif he thinks it expedient. And that all ather landit men of smaller rent and reuenew [revenue] big [build] pelis and greit strenthis as they please for the saifing of thaimselfs, &c.; and that the said strenthis, barmkynis, and pelis be biggit and completit within twa yeris under pane."

=== Rough Wooing ===
Kirkhope was burnt and its stock removed during the campaign of Charles Brandon, 1st Duke of Suffolk in the early stages of the Rough Wooing of Mary, Queen of Scots, by Henry VIII of England. The actual raiding itself was carried out by members of the cross border "Riding Family" of Armstrong.

=== Auld Wat Scott of Harden ===
Walter Scott of Harden was a notorious Border Reiver. The tower of Kirkhope was used as a residence of the eldest sons of the Scotts of Harden Castle, immediately to the west of Hawick. Young Wat Scott brought his bride and cousin Mary Scott of Dryhope, better known as the "Flower of Yarrow" back to Kirkhope prior to the death of his father William. Mary Scott was as renowned for her beauty as much as her mate was known for his belligerence. Wat Scott was later to be a supporter of Francis Stewart, 1st Earl of Bothwell, an unsuccessful warrant for his arrest was made in 1592 by James VI. Wat Scott, although the subject of many Border ballads is perhaps best remembered by his wife's reaction to empty stores, presenting him with his spurs on a platter for dinner – a signal to ready his men for a raid.

=== Later centuries ===
Kirkhope came into the possession of Anne Scott, 1st Duchess of Buccleuch, widow of the Duke of Monmouth in the early eighteenth century and from mid-nineteenth century it was allowed to fall into a state of decay.

By 1907 the tower was the poetic subject of eleven stanzas by Scottish Border poet and Australian bush balladeer Will H. Ogilvie (1869–1963), a romantic reflection of its former life contrasted to its present state:

I climb by the broken stairway; the great grey wall
Runs fair and free to the roof, uncrossed of beam;
And that that was lady's bower, and this that was hall
Where the strong men feasted, are one; and again I dream,

=== Today ===
Kirkhope Tower was rescued from ruin in the later part of the twentieth century and by 1996 it was again in use as a private residence. It is now owned by Peter Clarke, a former Conservative parliamentary candidate and landowner. Clarke was spokesperson for the Wild Beasts Trust, a movement to reintroduce numerous wild species back into the United Kingdom.

In 2007 Peter Clarke was interviewed and gave a tour of Kirkhope Tower on the BBC TV programme Castle in the Country, first aired on 16 July 2008, in episode 6 of the 4th series.

The tower and associated barmkin has been designated a scheduled monument and Category A listed building by Historic Environment Scotland.

As of April 2019, the tower is offered for sale.

== See also ==
- List of places in the Scottish Borders
- List of places in Scotland
- Scheduled monuments in the Scottish Borders
