= Darnhall (disambiguation) =

Darnhall may refer to:

- Darnhall, the village in Cheshire
- Darnhall Mains, the farm and settlement near Eddleston in the Scottish Borders
- A name used historically for the tower house Black Barony near Eddleston in the Scottish Borders
