= Bow Castle Broch =

Bow Castle
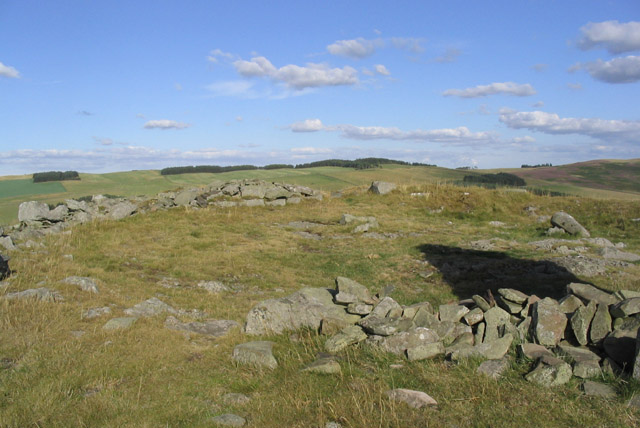

- Location within Scottish Borders
- 55.665942°N 2.857845°W
- Type: Broch
- Periods: Iron Age
- Location: Stow of Wedale

Scheduled monument
- Designated: 28 February 1924
- Reference no.: SM1162

Bow Castle is the remains of an iron-age broch near the Gala Water, in the Scottish Borders area of Scotland, in the parish of Stow. It is a scheduled monument.

== Description ==
Bow Castle (grid reference NT46134171) stands on level ground on the edge of a steep slope southwest of the valley of the Gala Water. The broch has a wall 4.1 metres thick, enclosing an area 9.7 metres in diameter.

The broch is one of only three remaining in the Borders; the other two are Torwoodlee Broch, and Edin's Hall Broch.

== Excavations ==
It was excavated in 1890 when pottery, including some 2nd-century Roman amphora fragments, were found. In 1922 a 2nd-century Roman enamelled bronze brooch in the form of a cockerel was found among the ruins of the wall.

Information concerning the dating and use of the broch is limited due to the lack of modern excavations. However, Torwoodlee Broch, two miles to the north, was built and destroyed during the Roman occupations of southern Scotland and it is likely that Bow Castle shared a similar history.

== Conservation and heritage status ==
Bow Castle Broch is protected as a scheduled monument under the Ancient Monuments and Archaeological Areas Act 1979, the main legislation used in the United Kingdom to safeguard nationally important archaeological sites. The monument was first scheduled on 28 February 1924 in recognition of its significance as one of the few surviving brochs in the Scottish Borders.

The site is recorded and monitored by Historic Environment Scotland. The designation protects both the visible remains of the broch and the surrounding ground where buried archaeological deposits may survive. Because of this status, any excavation, construction, or other disturbance requires official consent under heritage protection law.

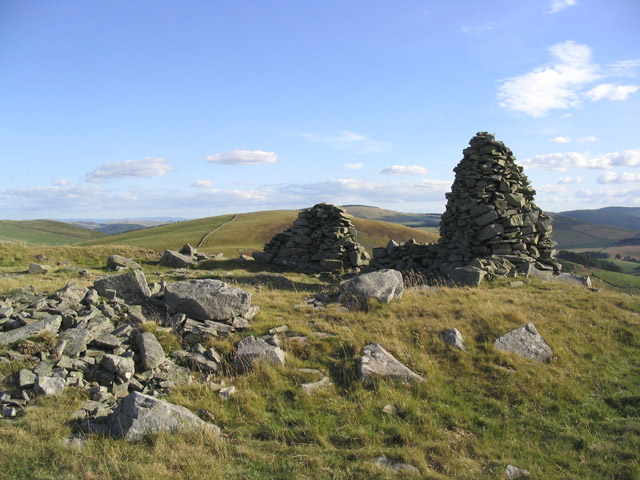
Cairn and the remains of Bow Castle Broch. One of only three brochs in the Scottish Borders, alongside Torwoodlee Broch near Galashiels and Edin's Hall Broch near Abbey St Bathans.

Today, the broch survives mainly as low turf covered stonework marking the circular wall of the tower. The remains stand on open ground overlooking the valley of the Gala Water. Like many rural monuments in Scotland, the site is preserved through legal protection and land management rather than reconstruction.

Bow Castle is one of only a few brochs known in the Scottish Borders, alongside Torwoodlee Broch and Edin's Hall Broch. These sites help archaeologists understand how broch building spread beyond its northern Scottish heartlands into communities living near the Roman frontier during the Iron Age.

The monument lies within farmland near Stow of Wedale and can be reached on foot across the surrounding landscape. It has no visitor facilities, but the circular outline of the broch can still be seen in the ground.
