= Tinnis Castle (Yarrow) =

Scottish tower house or castle in Yarrow, Scottish Borders

Tinnis Castle or Tynnis Castle was formerly a Scottish tower house or castle at Old Tinnis in the parish of Yarrow, Scottish Borders, or former county of Selkirkshire.

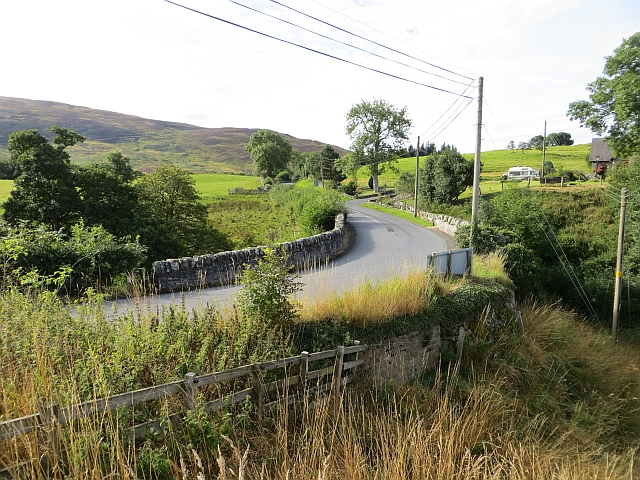
Bridge at Old Tinnis

There is also a "Tinnis Castle" at Drumelzier.

Tynnis in Yarrow was part of the dower lands of Ettrick Forest given to Scottish queens. It was used as the house of the royal forest official, the Ranger or Master Currour of Yarrow in the 15th century.

A property charter shows there was a tower at Tinnis and ruins of another tower remain at nearby Deuchar. In December 1520, Margaret Tudor, the widow of James IV of Scotland who had married the Earl of Angus, granted the forest stead lands of Tynnis and the tower and place of Tynnis, with the adjacent forest stead of Deuchar to Lady Agnes Stewart, Countess of Bothwell, for nine years.

The lands of Tinnis in Ettrick continued to provide an income for Mary, Queen of Scots.

In July 1592, James VI of Scotland gave orders to William Stewart of Traquair to demolish the "place and houssis of Tynneis", and also ordered the demolition of Harden and Dryhope. James Stewart of Tinnis and Walter Scott of Harden had joined in the rebellion of Francis Stewart, 5th Earl of Bothwell at the Raid of Falkland. It is not clear if this was "Tinnis" in Yarrow or the castle in Drumelzier, and in the next year Lord Home sold Tinnis tower in Yarrow to John Home, a royal servant and brother of the Laird of Manderston. He sold the tower and lands to James Pringle.

The former site of "Tynneis", as marked on early maps, was between the Yarrow Water and the Lewenshope Burn.
