= Redscarhead =

Village in Scottish Borders, Scotland, UK

Coordinates: 55.6841°N 3.2105°W

Redscarhead is a village in the Scottish Borders area of Scotland, off the A703, by the Eddleston Water, and close to Cringletie.

In the village is a memorial to George Meikle Kemp, the architect who designed the Scott Monument in Edinburgh.

== See also ==
- List of places in the Scottish Borders
- List of places in East Lothian
- List of places in Midlothian
- List of places in West Lothian

== Gallery ==
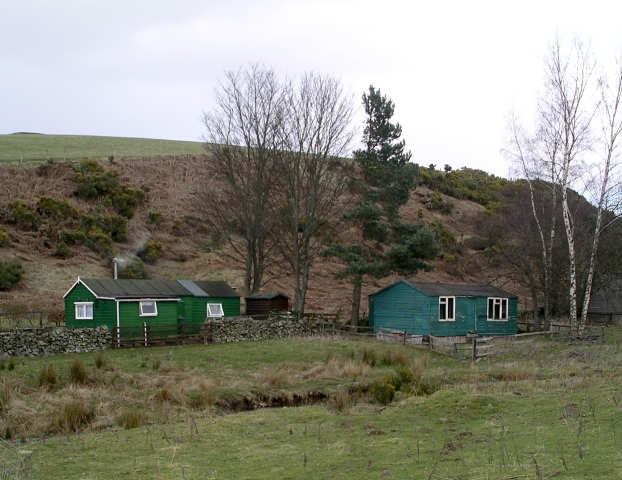
Holiday cottages

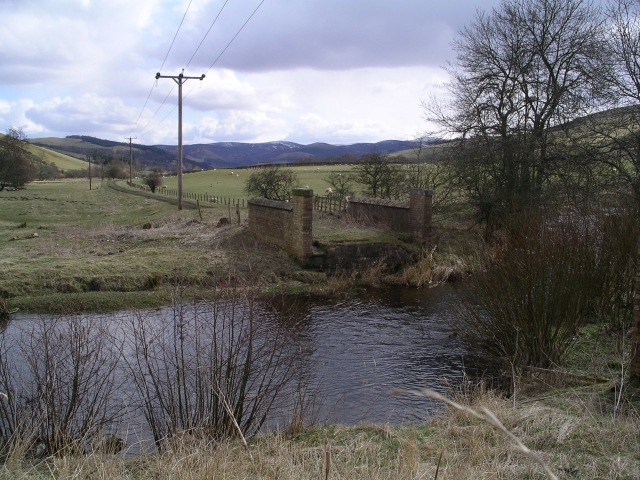
Disused railway line, Redscarhead

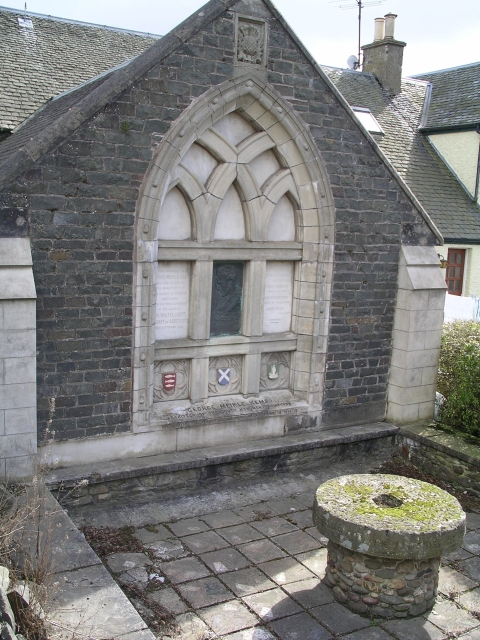
Monument to George Meikle Kemp

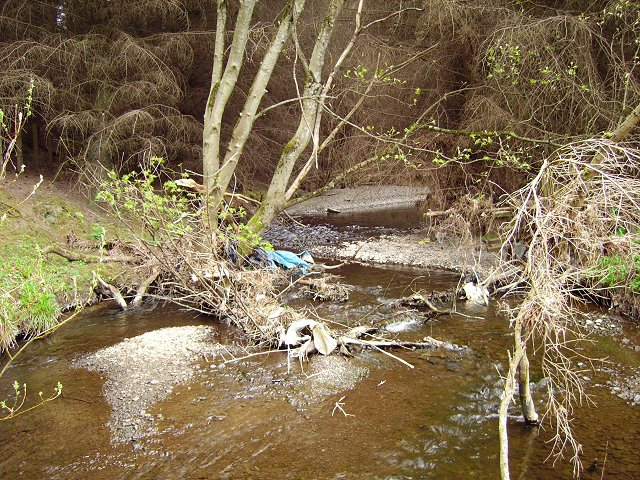
Eddleston Water
