= Tom Scott (painter, born 1854) =

Scottish painter (1854–1927)

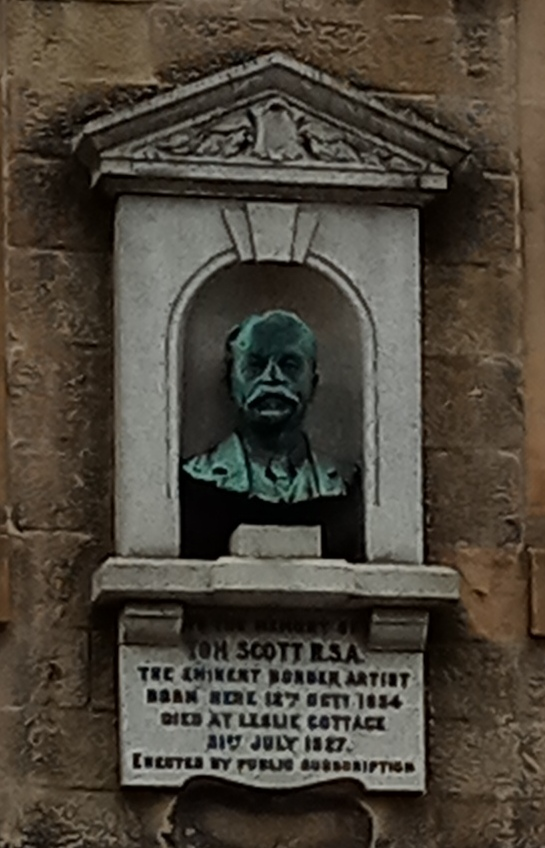
- Bust of Scott at 51 High Street, Selkirk, Scotland
- Born: 27 October 1854; Selkirk, Scotland
- Died: 21 July 1927 (aged 72); Selkirk, Scotland
- Occupation: Painter

Thomas Scott RSA RSW (27 October 1854–21 July 1927) was a Scottish painter, primarily a watercolourist. He was born in Selkirk in the Scottish Borders, on 27 October 1854 and died on 21 July 1927.

== Selection of Scott's work ==
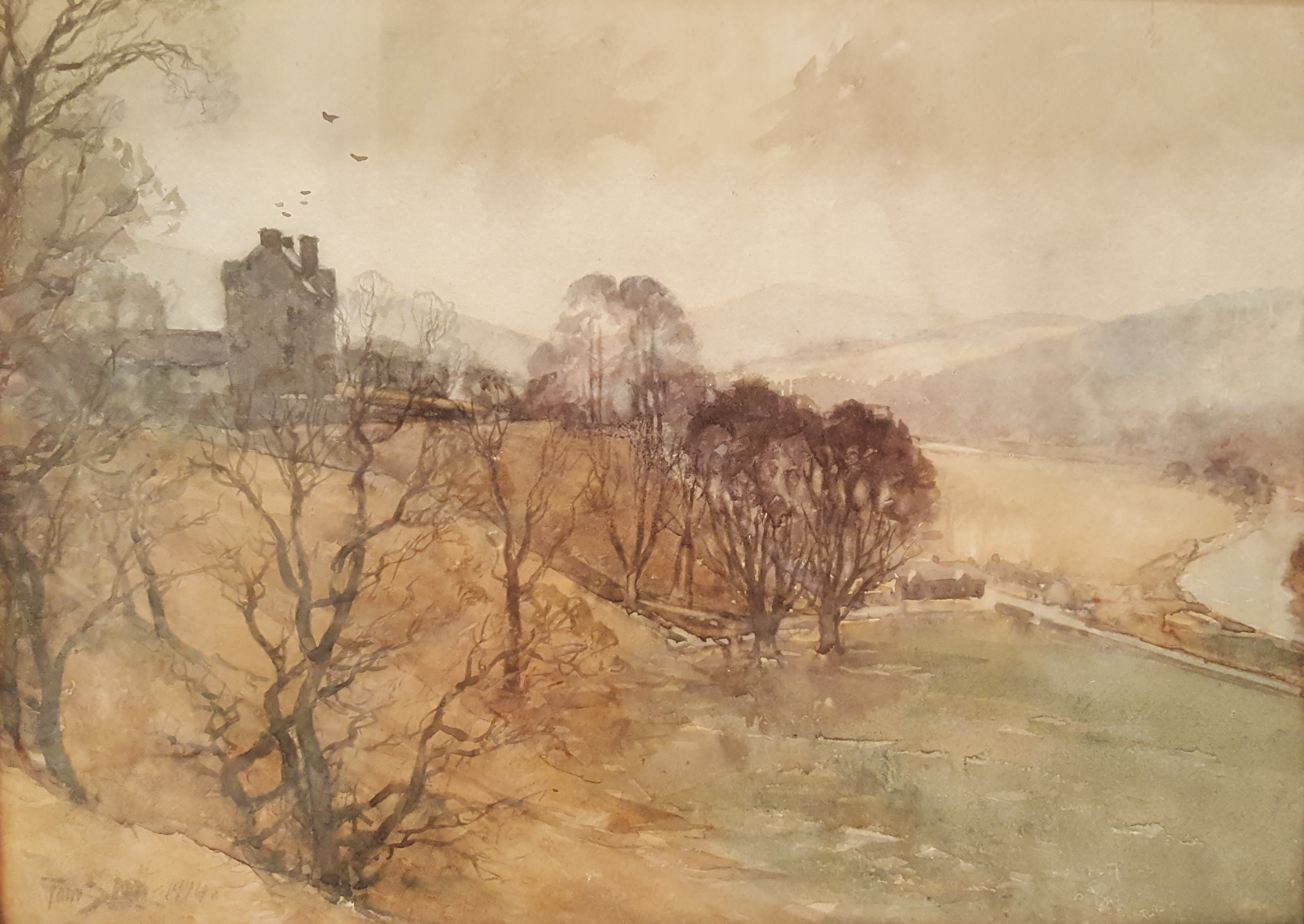
Aikwood Tower, Selkirk (1914)

Auld Wat of Harden

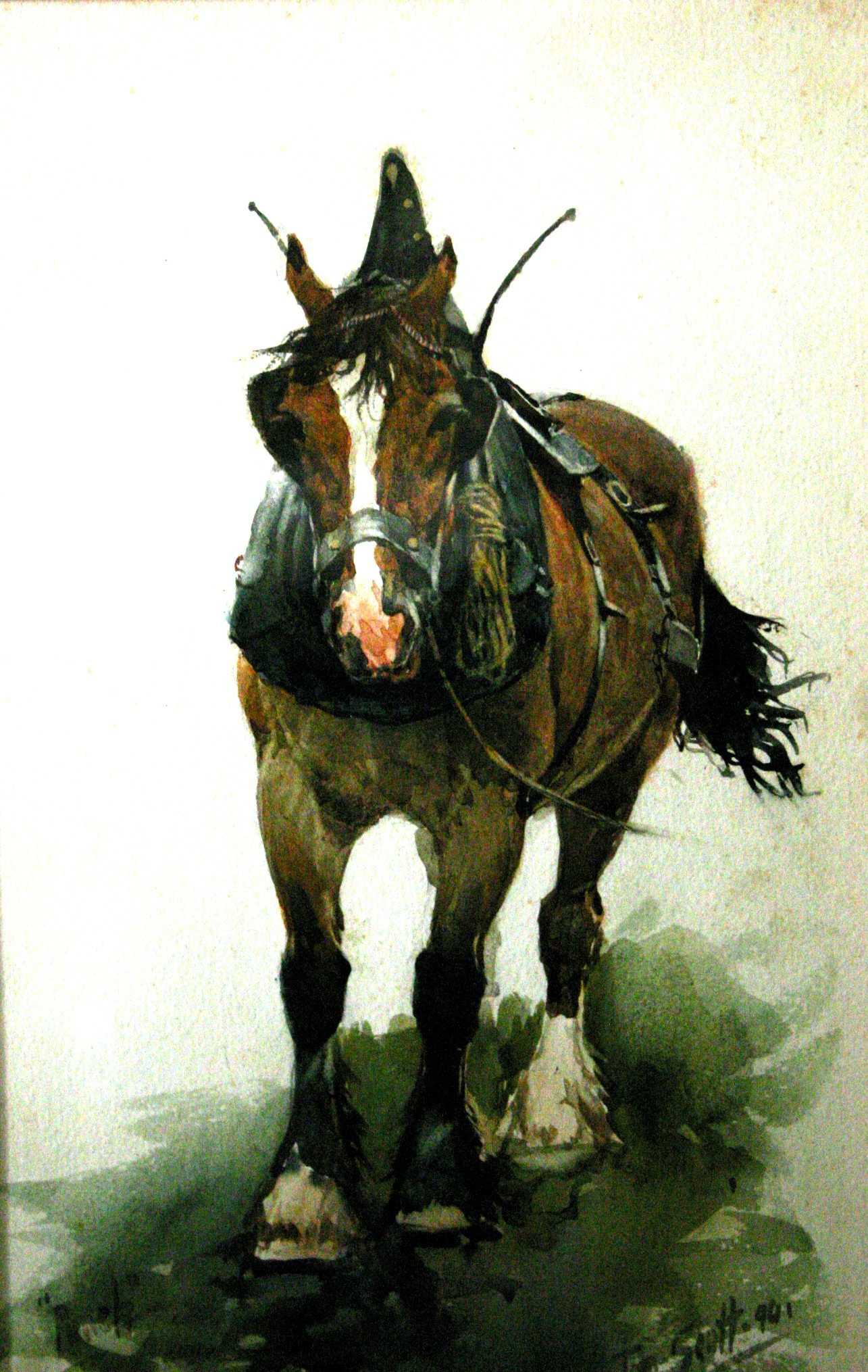
Horse (1890)
