= Cringletie =

House in the Scottish Borders, Scotland

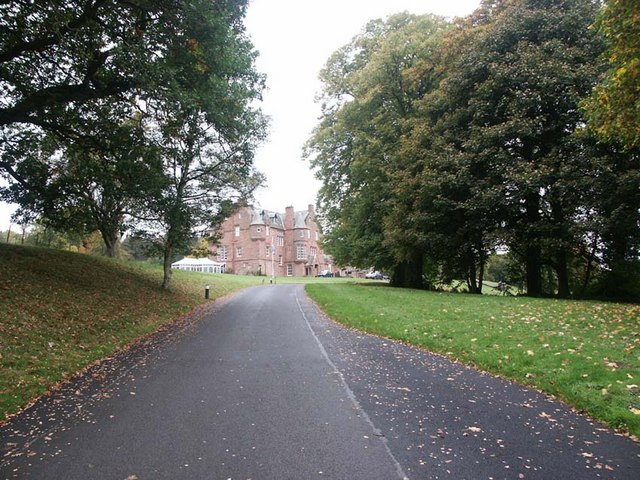
- Cringletie House

- Location in the Scottish Borders

General information
- Type: Scottish Baronial house
- Location: Near Eddleston, Scottish Borders, Scotland
- Coordinates: 55°41′17″N 3°13′07″W
- Completed: 1861

Design and construction
- Architect: David Bryce

Cringletie is a Scottish Baronial house by the Eddleston Water, around 3 kilometres (1.9 mi) south of Eddleston in the Scottish Borders area of Scotland, in the former Peeblesshire. Designed by David Bryce and built in 1861, the house is a Category B listed building. Since 1971 it has been operated as a country house hotel.

== History ==
A "tower and manor place" at "Cringiltie" are mentioned in a charter of 1633. The lands of Cringletie were purchased in 1666 by Alexander Murray of Black Barony, another nearby estate. Murray built a house on the site, which forms the core of the present building. Captain Alexander Murray (1715–1762), an officer of the British Army who saw service in the Seven Years' War, was born here. The house belonged to the Murray, later Wolfe Murray, family until 1941. In 1971 it was first converted into a hotel, and has since changed ownership on more than one occasion.

The grounds of the house include a walled garden and an 18th-century doocot.

== See also ==
- List of places in the Scottish Borders
- Historic houses in Scotland
