= Darnhall Mains =

Village in Scotland

Coordinates: 55.72092°N 3.21108°W

Darnhall Mains is a farm and settlement off the A703, near Eddleston and the Eddleston Water in the Scottish Borders area of Scotland, in the former Peeblesshire.

Nearby is a tower house with alternative names: Darnhall, Darn Hall, Black Barony or Barony Castle. It is now the Barony Castle Hotel.

== See also ==
- List of places in the Scottish Borders
- List of places in Scotland
