= Dryhope =

Village in Scottish Borders, Scotland

Coordinates: 55.50908°N 3.16196°W

Dryhope is a village in the Scottish Borders area of Scotland, by St. Mary's Loch, on the A708. Known for its rolling green hills and ample walking paths. Also home of St Mary's Loch, the largest natural loch in the Scottish Borders.

== See also ==
- Dryhope Tower
- List of places in the Scottish Borders
- List of places in Scotland
