= Old Thirlestane Castle =

Castle in Scotland

- Thirlestane, Scottish Borders, Scotland
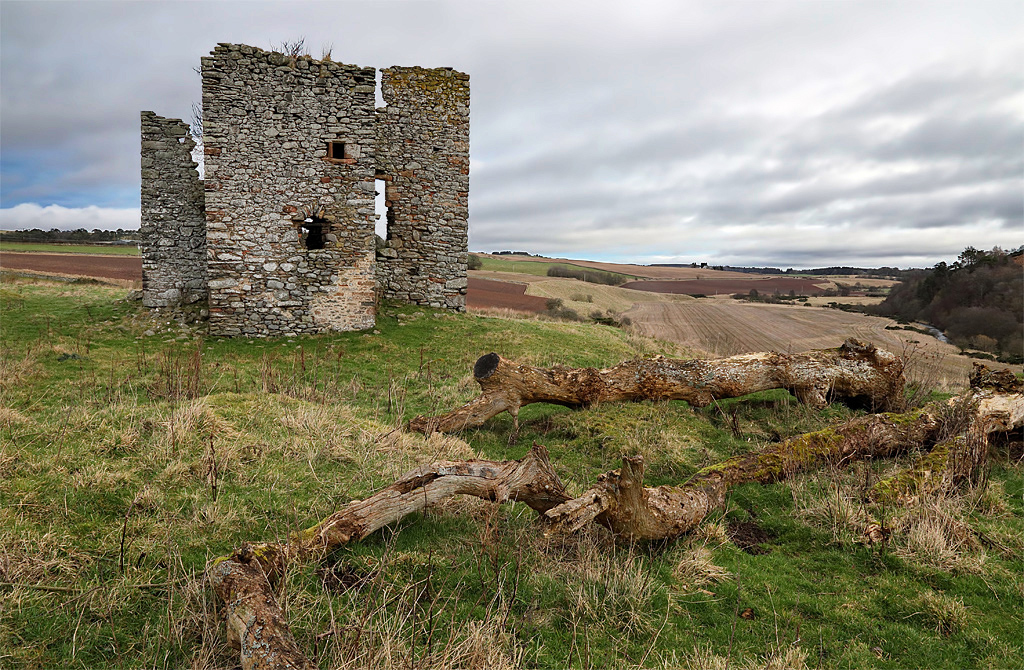
- Old Thirlestane Castle in 2020

Site information
- Condition: Ruins

Location
- Coordinates: 55°43′05″N 2°41′39″W

Old Thirlestane Castle was a castle located at Thirlestane, Scottish Borders, Scotland.

== History ==
The castle was inherited by the Maitland family, via the marriage of Richard Mautalent and Avicia, daughter of Thomas de Thirlestane in the 13th century. It lays near the Boondreigh Water.

Held by the Maitland family until the late 16th century when they moved to the new castle constructed at Lauder, by the Earl of Lauderdale, now known as Thirlestane Castle.

The castle lies in ruins in the countryside.

== Bibliography ==
- Coventry, Martin (2008). Castles of the Clans: the strongholds and seats of 750 Scottish families and clans. Musselburgh.
