= White Meldon =

Hillfort in Scottish Borders, Scotland

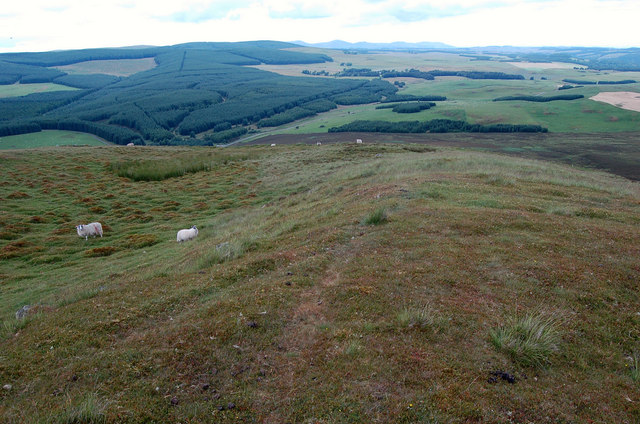
- Part of a rampart on the north-east side of the summit

- Location within Scottish Borders
- 55°40′22″N 3°14′34″W
- Type: Hillfort
- Periods: Iron Age
- Location: Near Lyne, Scotland
- OS grid reference: NT 219 428

Site notes
- Elevation: 427 m (1,401 ft)

Scheduled monument
- Reference no.: SM114

White Meldon is a prehistoric site, a hillfort near the village of Lyne and about 4 miles (6 km) west of Peebles, in the Scottish Borders, Scotland. It is a Scheduled Monument.

The hillfort on the neighbouring hill Black Meldon is about 1 mile (1.6 km) to the west, on the other side of Meldon Burn.

== Description ==
The hill has elevation 427 metres (1,401 ft), and it is a Marilyn; it is a large hill, overlooking to the west the valley of Meldon Burn. The fort has four concentric lines of defence. The inner two are incomplete; the third, a continuous wall in a ruined state, is about 3.5 metres (11 ft) wide, measuring 260 metres (850 ft) north–south by 167 metres (548 ft) west–east, enclosing an area of about 2.9 hectares (7.2 acres). Inside this area, the remains of at least 29 round-houses have been discerned, some of which are well-defined platforms.

There are fragments of an outermost rampart, which may not have been finished. The fort may have been built in stages, expanding from the innermost defence, the incomplete outer defence being the last stage; but the sequence of building has not been definitely established.

At the foot of the western slope of White Meldon, at grid reference NT 2140 4290, is a fortified enclosure, on a shelf above the eastern bank of Meldon Burn. It is oval, about 68 metres (223 ft) north–south and 52 metres (171 ft) west–east, the single rampart being up to 2.1 metres (6 ft 11 in) high. More than half of the interior is occupied by a later settlement, with a wall that on the west side incorporates the earlier construction. The enclosure is a scheduled monument, no. SM3165.

There is a group of nine house platforms on the north-western slope of the hill, at grid reference NT 2183 4357; they have diameter 11–18 metres (36–59 ft). The group is a scheduled monument, no. SM2712.
