= Mervinslaw Pele =

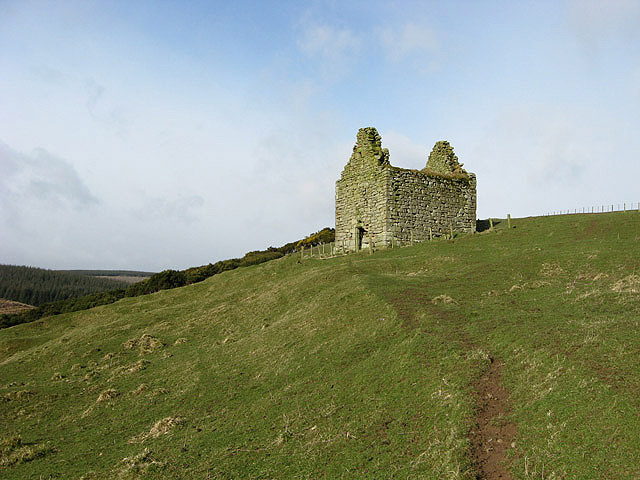
- Interactive map of Mervinslaw Pele
- Type: Castle
- Location: Scottish Borders, Scotland
- OS grid reference: NT 67177 11754

History
- Built: 16th century

Listed Building – Category A
- Official name: PELE-HOUSE, MERVINSLAW
- Designated: 16 March 1971
- Delisted: 29 Oct 2015
- Reference no.: LB13886

Scheduled monument
- Official name: Mervinslaw Tower
- Designated: 28 Feb 1948
- Reference no.: SM1717

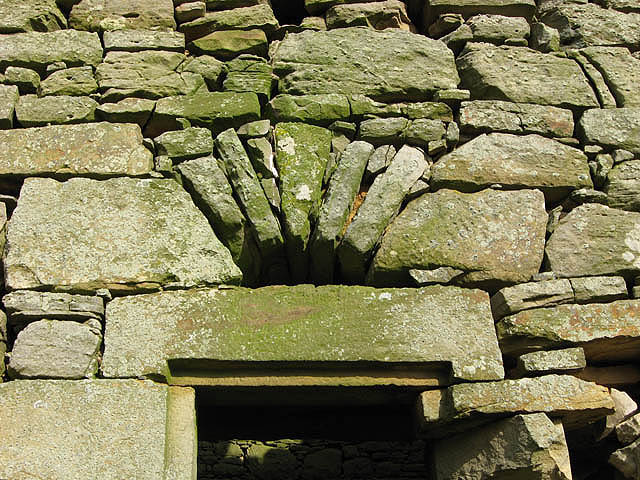
Lintel and stonework at Mervinslaw pele house

Mervinslaw Pele, also known as Mervinslaw Tower, is a 16th-century castle in the Scottish Borders. It is mostly intact except for its roof.

It is 7.77 metres (25.5 ft) by 6.5 metres (21 ft) with walls about 1.2 metres (3 ft 11 in) thick. It is two storeys tall, plus a garret. There are no stairs, and access was thought to be via ladders. There is no fireplace, but there is evidence of a hearth. There is evidence of other buildings existing nearby.

It belonged to the Olivers.

== See also ==
- Peel tower
