= Edin's Hall Broch =

2nd-century broch near Duns in the Borders of Scotland

Edins Hall Broch
- Edinshall Broch
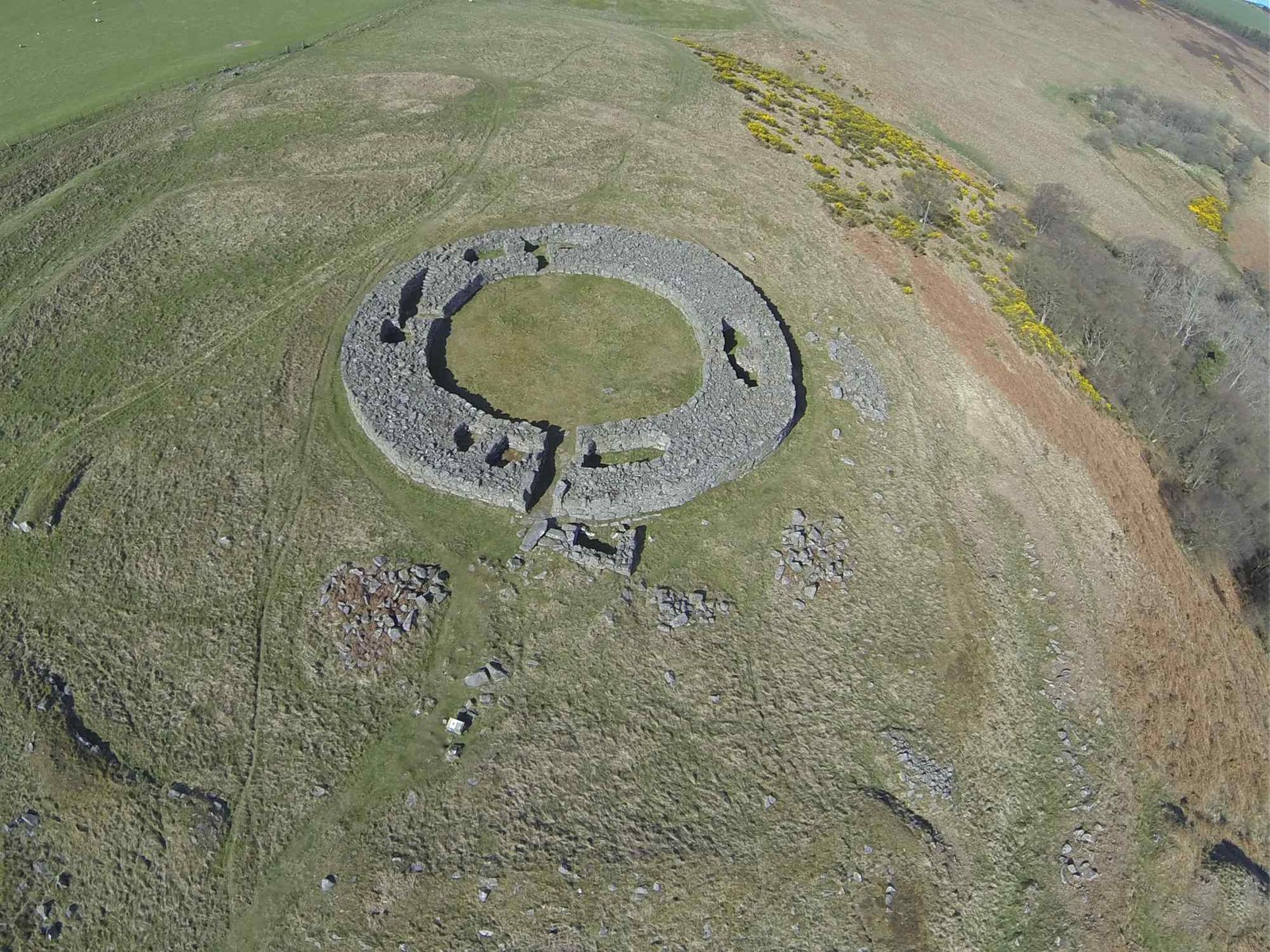
- Edin's Hall Broch, aerial photograph
- Interactive map of Edins Hall Broch
- 55.835506°N 2.364856°W
- Type: Broch
- Periods: Iron Age
- Location: Duns

Site notes
- Owner: Historic Scotland
- Public access: Yes

Edin's Hall Broch (also Edinshall Broch; Woden's Hall Broch) is a 2nd-century broch near Duns in the Borders of Scotland. It is one of very few brochs found in southern Scotland. It is roughly 28 metres in diameter.

== Name ==
In the late 18th century this site was called "Woden's Hall or Castle" (Woden being the chief god from Anglo-Saxon mythology). Its later name change apparently recalls the legend of the three-headed giant The Red Ettin known in tales and ballads.

== Location ==
Edin's Hall Broch is one of the most southerly broch survivals, which are more typically associated with Northern Scotland. It is 4 miles north of the town of Duns. It stands on the northeast slope of Cockburn Law just above a fairly steep slope down to the Whiteadder Water.

The broch stands in the northwest corner an Iron Age hillfort which presumably pre-dates the broch. The hillfort consists of a double rampart and ditches, enclosing an oval area some 135 metres by 75 metres. The entrance was on the west side. A large circular structure (roundhouse) in the centre of the fort, close to the broch, may have been the most important building before the broch's construction.

== Construction and dating ==
Edin's Hall Broch rises within the remains of an earlier Iron Age hillfort on the northeast slope of Cockburn Law, overlooking the valley of the Whiteadder Water. Long before the tower appeared, this hilltop was already fortified. Double ramparts and ditches enclosed an oval area measuring roughly 135 by 75 m (443 by 246 ft), creating a defended settlement that likely belonged to the pre-Roman Iron Age.

At some point later, the character of the site changed. A massive circular stone tower, the broch, was built into the northwest corner of the hillfort. Its builders cut partly through the earlier defences to make room for the structure, transforming the interior of the fort rather than abandoning it. The broch itself is unusually large, measuring about 28 m (92 ft) in diameter, making it one of the biggest examples of its kind in southern Scotland.

Pinning down the exact date of the tower is difficult. In the 19th century the site was cleared by antiquarians who removed rubble and collected artefacts but did not record the soil layers and deposits that archaeologists use to reconstruct a site's history. Because those layers were disturbed before modern excavation methods existed, much of the evidence that might have dated the broch has been lost.

Instead, archaeologists estimate the date by comparing Edin's Hall with similar sites in the region. Brochs in southern Scotland are generally thought to belong to the Roman Iron Age. Excavations at Torwoodlee Broch in the Scottish Borders showed that the tower there was built and destroyed during the 2nd century AD, in the turbulent years between two periods of Roman occupation in southern Scotland. Since Edin's Hall stands in the same frontier landscape and shares similar architectural features, it is usually interpreted as belonging to this same phase of broch construction.

The broch therefore represents a later chapter in the life of the hillfort. Across the interior of the enclosure, the outlines of smaller buildings can still be traced as low stone footings in the grass. Some of these houses lie across the earlier ramparts, showing that the settlement continued to change long after the hillfort was first built and possibly after the broch itself had fallen out of use.

== Description ==
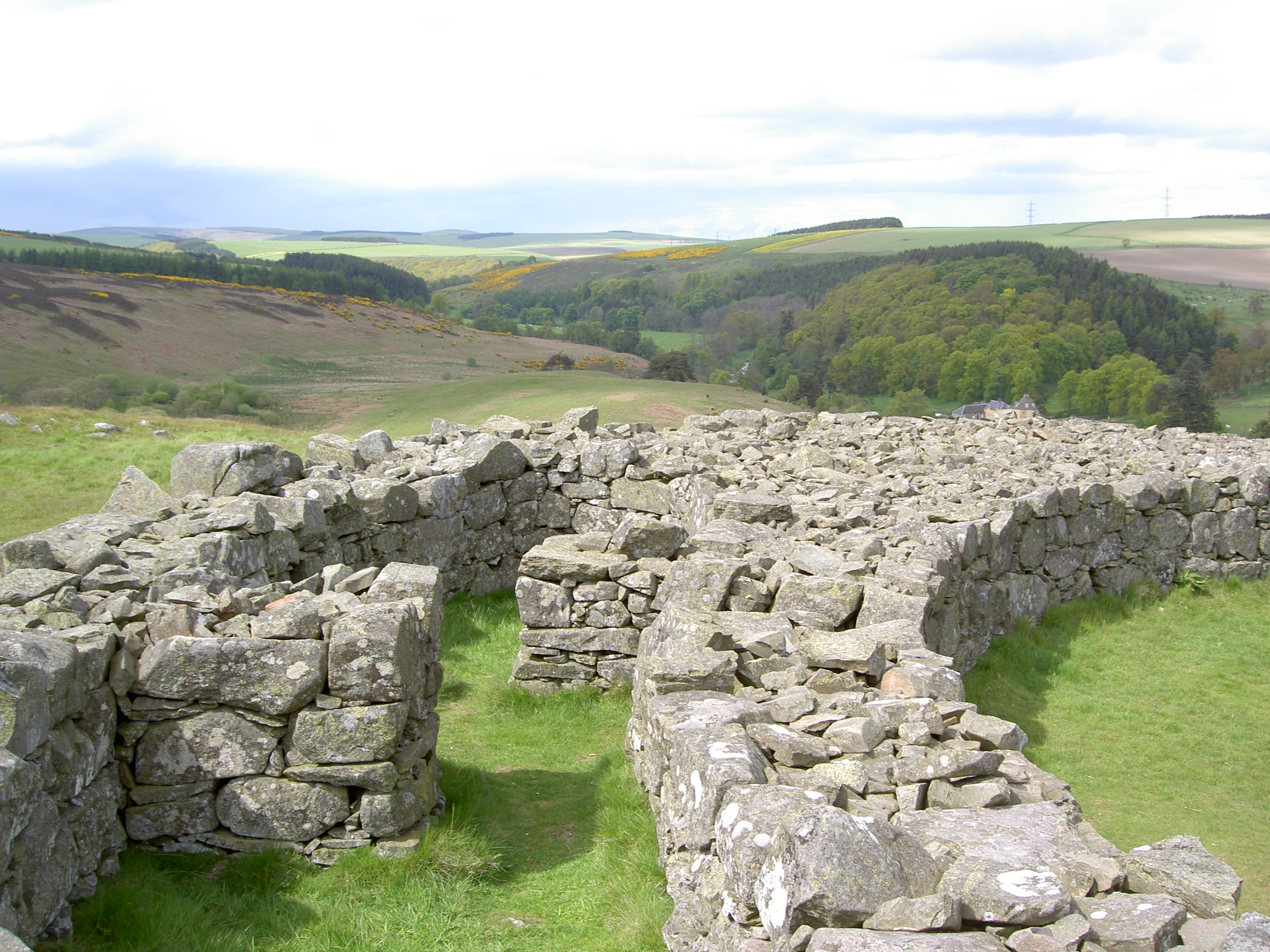
Edin's Hall Broch, showing intramural chambers

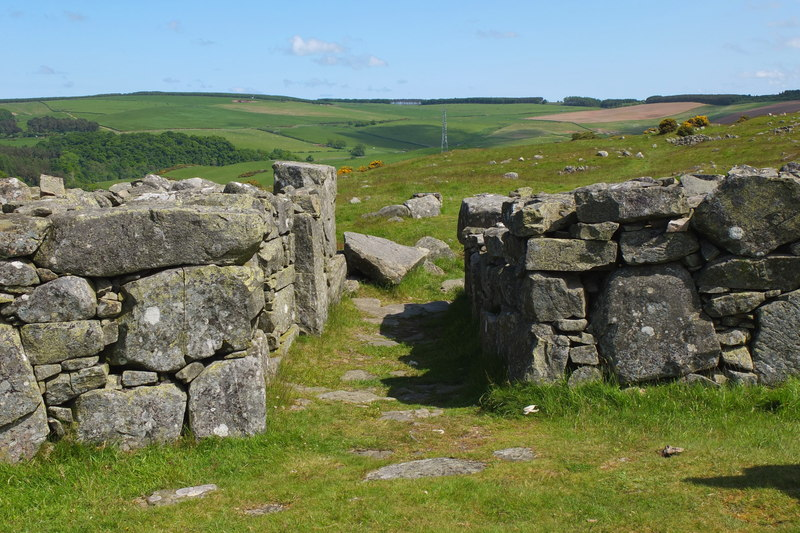
Entrance passage

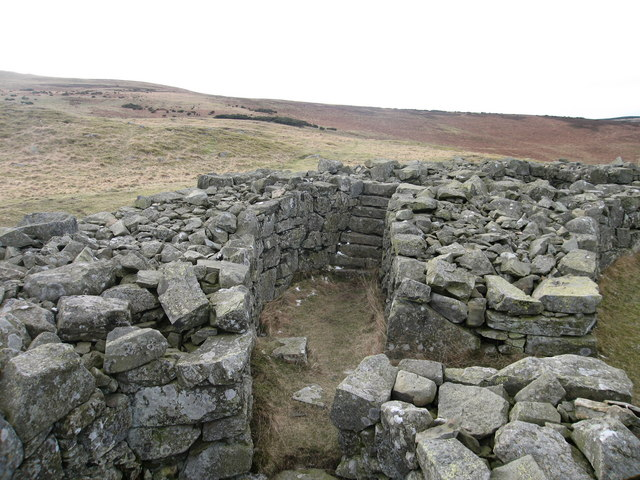
Stairs in the south wall of the broch

The broch has an external diameter of 28 metres, and an internal diameter of 17 metres. This is unusually large compared with a typical Highland broch and suggests that it may not have been as tall as the northern brochs. The walls of the broch survive to a height of between 1.0 and 1.8 metres. The entrance passage is on the east side and has two guard chambers flanking the doorway. The interior of the broch has three intramural cells which are all approximately dumb-bell shaped. The cell on the south side has the remains of a stone stairway at its north end which presumably rose to the wallhead.

The broch lies within a rectangular enclosure measuring about 58 by 54 metres.

== Excavations ==
Edin's Hall was "cleared" by antiquarians in the 19th century. The relics recovered were donated to the National Museum of Scotland. These included a stone spindle whorl, a piece of a jet ring, an amber bead, bones, an oyster shell, and a fragment of a glass bracelet.

Two copper ingots, one of which is now in the National Museum, were apparently found with a metal detector inside the broch in 1976. The ingots were derived from local copper mines and may have been an important source of wealth for the inhabitants.

An archaeological survey and sample excavation was conducted in 1996. A few artefacts including coarse pottery and a stone spindle whorl were recovered.
