= Lanton Tower =

Scottish castle

Location
- Coordinates: 55.485938°N 2.605958°W

Site history
- Built: 16th century

Lanton Tower is a 16th-century tower house, about 2.0 miles (3.2 km) northwest of Jedburgh, Scottish Borders, Scotland, at Lanton.

== History ==
In 1513 the tower was sacked. By 1627 is belonged to the Cranstons. Douglas of Cavers had acquired it by 1627. It has been altered, with a modern mansion, attached, and restored in 1989.

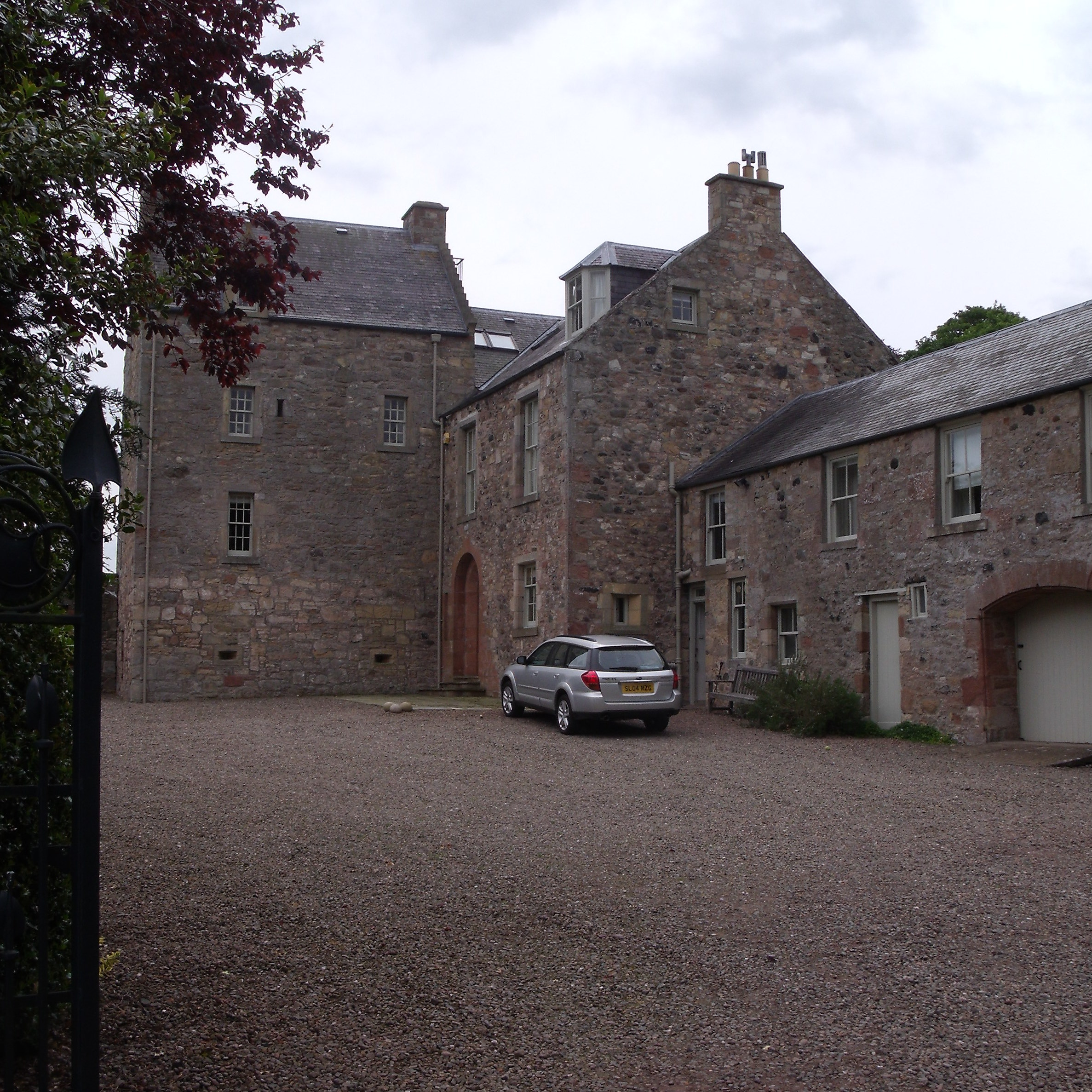
Lanton Tower (geograph 2481545)

== Structure ==
The tower is rectangular; it has three storeys, and a garret. The upper part has been altered, and many windows enlarged. It had a vaulted basement, with a hatch in the wall. There are two gun-loops, in the west wall.

Before alteration the tower may have been L-plan. Its dimensions are 26.25 feet (8.00 m) north to south, and 23 feet (7.0 m) east to west.

== See also ==
- Castles in Great Britain and Ireland
- List of castles in Scotland
