= Muircleuch Tower =

Castle in Scotland

- Muircleuch, Scottish Borders, Scotland

Site information
- Condition: Ruins

Muircleuch Tower was a peel tower house located near Muircleuch, Scottish Borders, Scotland.

== History ==
Owned by the Lauder family, the castle once stood near the Muir Cleuch glen.

== Bibliography ==
- Smith, Jane Stewart (1898), The Grange of St. Giles, the Bass: And the Other Baronial Homes of the Dick-Lauder Family, OCLC 8999920
