= Wild Beasts Trust =

British conservation organisation

The Wild Beasts Trust is an endangered species enthusiast movement who, in September 2006, declared their intentions to reintroduce numerous nationally extinct species back into the wild in the United Kingdom.

In part their actions were motivated by a desire to return the British countryside to its original setting. Although woodlands were returning, The Wild Beasts Trust saw the picture as half complete without their original inhabitants. The group wanted increased hunting and food potentials for the countryside. Spokesperson for The Wild Beasts Trust Peter Clarke, a landowner and former Conservative Party candidate, wrote that, "Our candidate species for rebuilding the habitat range from the grey whale to the dormouse, carnivore to herbivore. We include the wolf, the lynx, the bear, the wolverine, the beaver, the elk, the boar, the walrus, the bison, the mouflon, the lemming and one non-mammal - the sturgeon."

The initial areas for reintroduction appeared to be in Northumberland forests, and the borders region of Scotland. When it was revealed that six lynx and several wolves were being secretly held for reintroduction, the police became involved in the matter. They publicly warned the group that they would be committing a serious offence, also stating that a specific exotic animal licence was required to own any big cat. Richard Dodd, of the Countryside Alliance, said the plan had been a "ludicrous idea... Wolves are dangerous animals. What happens if they start killing children or farmer's livestock?" UK Government department DEFRA further denounced the plans, claiming the reintroductions could be "devastating" to the countryside. Spokesperson Peter Clarke's public defence was that, "Everyone has Little Red Riding Hood in their mental furniture, but that is far from the reality."

== Other attempts at reintroduction in the UK ==
In April 2007 research ecologists at Aberdeen University, led by Dr David Hetherington, made similar claims to those made by The Wild Beasts Trust.

On 18 April 2008, elk and boar, imported from Sweden, were reintroduced by Scottish landowner Paul Lister. He has further plans for lynx and wolves.
