= Milkieston Rings =

Hillfort in Scottish Borders, Scotland

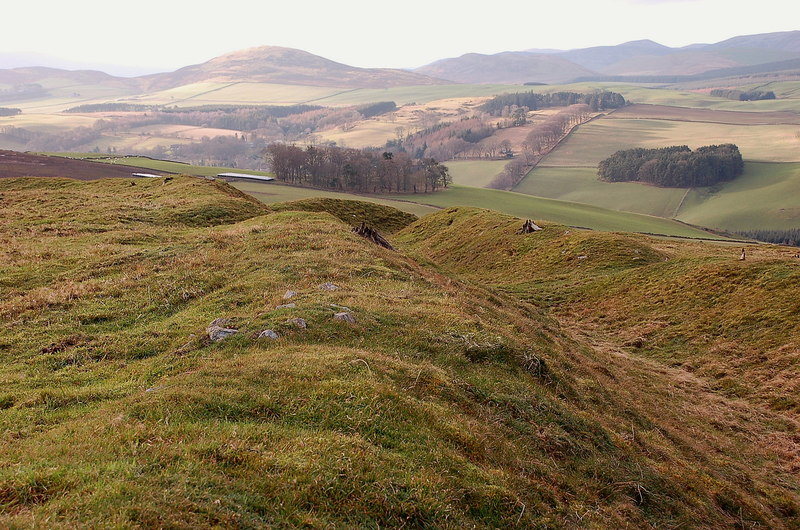
- The ramparts, looking south-west

- Location within Scottish Borders
- 55°42′4″N 3°11′53″W
- Type: Hillfort
- Periods: Iron Age
- Location: Near Eddleston, Scotland
- OS grid reference: NT 248 459

Scheduled monument
- Reference no.: SM2416

Milkieston Rings is a prehistoric site, a hillfort near the village of Eddleston and about 3 miles (5 km) north of Peebles, in the Scottish Borders, Scotland. It is a Scheduled Monument.

== Description ==
The fort is on Milkieston Hill, a broad spur projecting north-west from Cavarra Hill. There has been quarrying and stone-robbing of the site, such that interpretation is difficult; two or three phases of construction have been suggested.

There are two inner ramparts, which are now low stony banks; the innermost encloses a space about 49 metres (161 ft) north-north-west to south-south-east by 37 metres (121 ft), an area of 0.13 hectares (0.32 acres). About a quarter of the interior of the fort has been severely damaged by quarrying; there are traces of two probable house-platforms in the remaining part. There are three or four outer ramparts, built subsequently.
