= Black Meldon =

Hillfort in Scottish Borders, Scotland

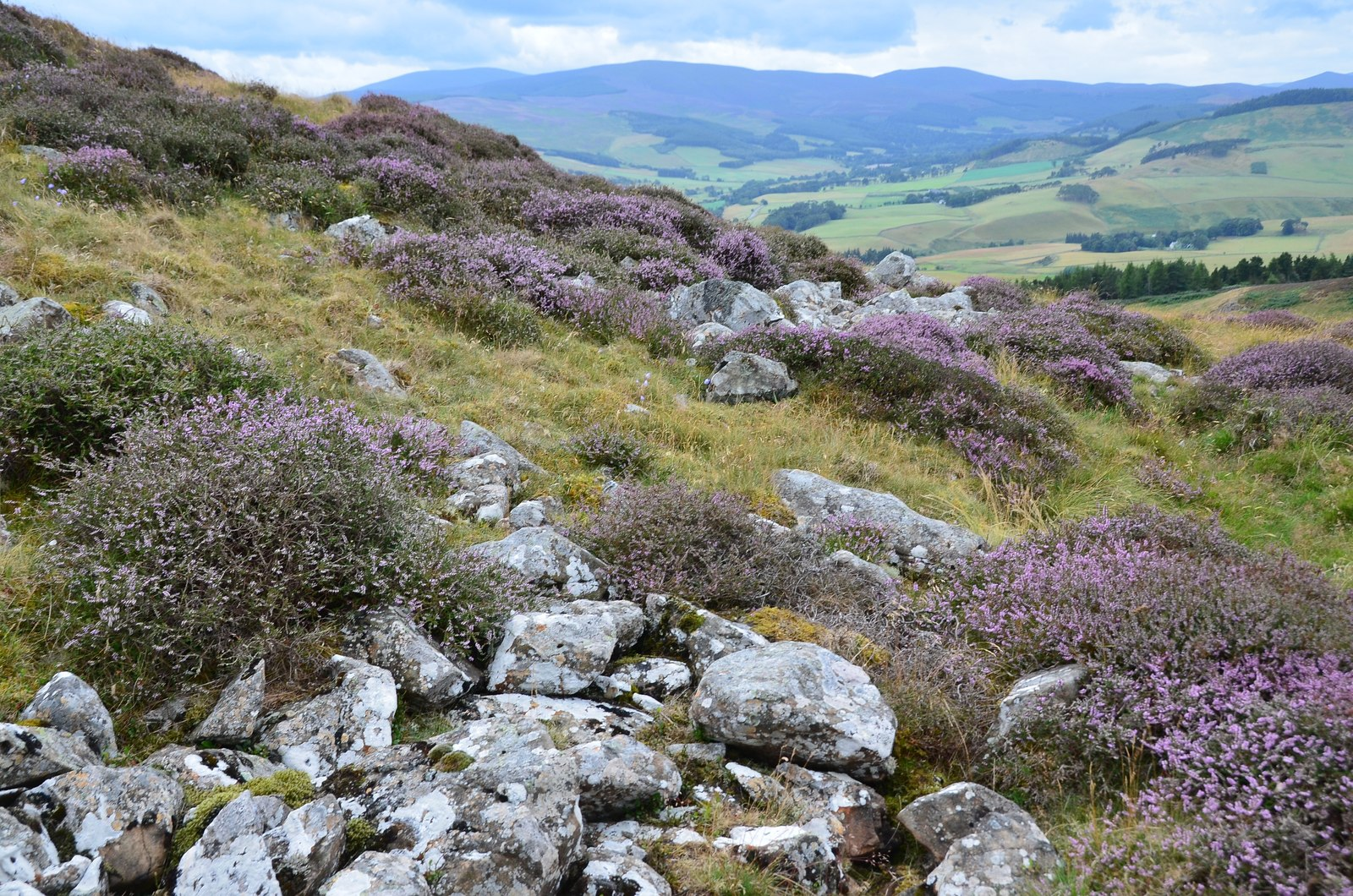
- Remains of the boundary wall of the fort

- Location within Scottish Borders
- 55°40′10″N 3°15′48″W
- Type: Hillfort
- Periods: Iron Age
- Location: Near Lyne, Scotland
- OS grid reference: NT 206 425

Site notes
- Elevation: 407 m (1,335 ft)

Scheduled monument
- Reference no.: SM2703

Black Meldon is a prehistoric site, a hillfort near the village of Lyne and about 4 miles (6 km) west of Peebles, in the Scottish Borders, Scotland. It is a Scheduled Monument.

The hillfort on the neighbouring hill White Meldon is about 1 mile (1.6 km) to the east, on the other side of Meldon Burn.

== Description ==
The hill has elevation 407 metres (1,335 ft). There is a gentle slope from the summit on the west side, steeper on other sides. The roughly oval fort on the summit is 73 metres (240 ft) north–south and 40 metres (130 ft) west–east, defined by a boundary wall, which is now a band of debris about 3 metres (10 ft) wide. On the north, west and south sides there is the debris of an outer wall.

Within the fort, at least seven ring-groove houses exist, five lying in a straight line along the north-south axis, ranging from 7m to 10m in diameter. The feature is a Scheduled Ancient Monument.
