= Borthwick Castle, Scottish Borders =

Tower house, now demolished, in Scottish Borders, Scotland

Coordinates: 55.7828°N 2.3677°W

Borthwick Castle, Scottish Borders was a 16th-century L-plan tower house, about 1 mile (1.6 km) north west of Duns, Scottish Borders, Scotland.

== History ==
The property belonged to the Clan Cockburn. It was destroyed by quarrying, having become ruinous, after 1970, although it had been excavated before demolition. Near the site stands a commemorative stone. It is thought that it was a watchtower and small residence, rather than a place of strength.

== Structure ==
Borthwick Castle had a courtyard surrounding the 16th-century buildings and a later house. There was a corbelled-out stair-tower in the re-entrant angle of the L-plan tower. The vaulted basement had a scale-and-platt staircase to the first floor. The tower’s dimension were about 17 metres (56 ft) by 11 metres (36 ft), with walls 2.4 metres (7 ft 10 in). Apart from narrow brick in the fireplace and window openings the building was constructed from mortared stone.

== See also ==
- Castles in Great Britain and Ireland
- List of castles in Scotland
