= Eddleston Water =

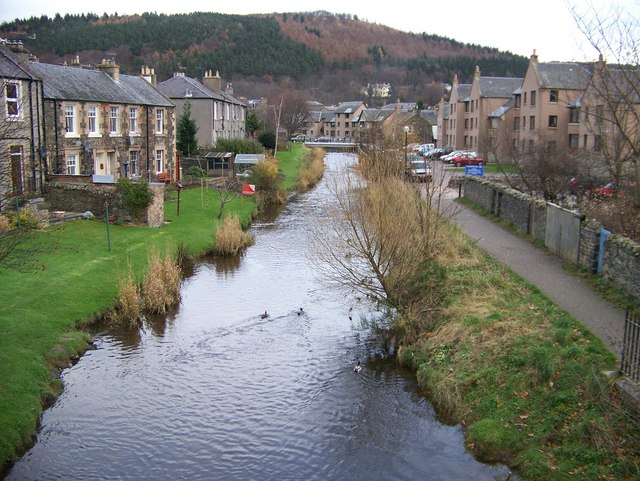
- Nickname: The Cuddy

Location
- Country: Scotland
- Council area: Scottish Borders
- Settlements: Eddleston, Redscarhead and Peebles

Physical characteristics
- Source: Howgate
  - location: Herbertshaw Farm
  - coordinates: 55°48′06″N 003°11′25″W
- Mouth: River Tweed
  - location: Peebles
  - coordinates: 55°39′03″N 003°11′43″W
- Basin size: 69 km^{2} (27 sq mi)

Basin features
- Progression: River Tweed→ Solway Firth→ Irish Sea
- River system: Solway Tweed
- Tributaries
  - left: Longcote Burn
  - right: Middle Burn; Shiplaw Burn

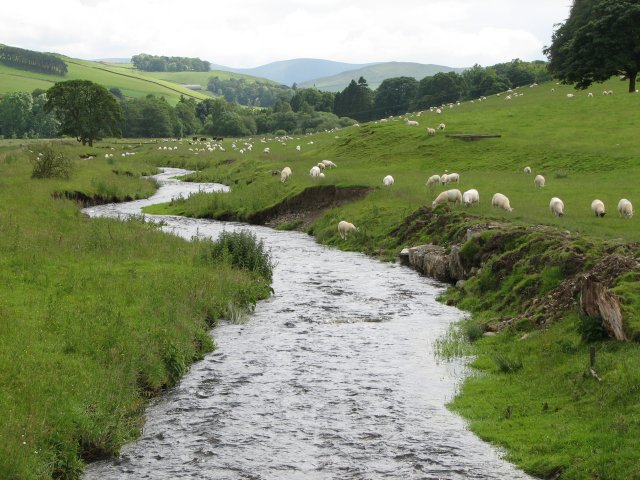
View south from the bridge to Darnhall Mains

Eddleston Water is a small river north of Peebles, in the Scottish Borders area of Scotland which joins the River Tweed at Peebles. It is also known locally as "The Cuddy".

== Course ==
Eddleston Water rises near Mount Lothian and passes through Waterheads, Eddleston, Milkieston, Redscarhead, along the route of the A703, and into Peebles past crossburn, and Dalatho, where the Tree Bridge, on an old drove road, and the Cuddy Bridge (just by brown brothers and squeaks old bit) cross it. The original bridge was constructed in the 15th century but was replaced in 1857 by the current bridge.

When the Edinburgh to Peebles railway was built in the middle of the 19th century the river was straightened for much of its course which adversely affected the wildlife habitat and increased the speed of flow. As a result, the river is liable to flooding.

== Flood management ==
In August 2009 the University of Dundee was invited to carry out an initial study on how Eddleston Water could be restored to provide a better habitat for wildlife and to reduces the risk of flooding in Peebles and Eddleston. Known as natural flood management (NFM) it involves re-meandering, tree planting and other measures, including "leaky dams" where logs are placed across a stream in such a way that the normal flow passes under but, as the water rises, the logs slow the passage of the water. This has been shown to be more effective at reducing flooding than the introduction of bends though the latter has led to an increase of biodiversity along the river.

== See also ==
- Darnhall Mains
- List of places in the Scottish Borders
- List of places in Scotland
- List of rivers of Scotland
