= Northshield Rings =

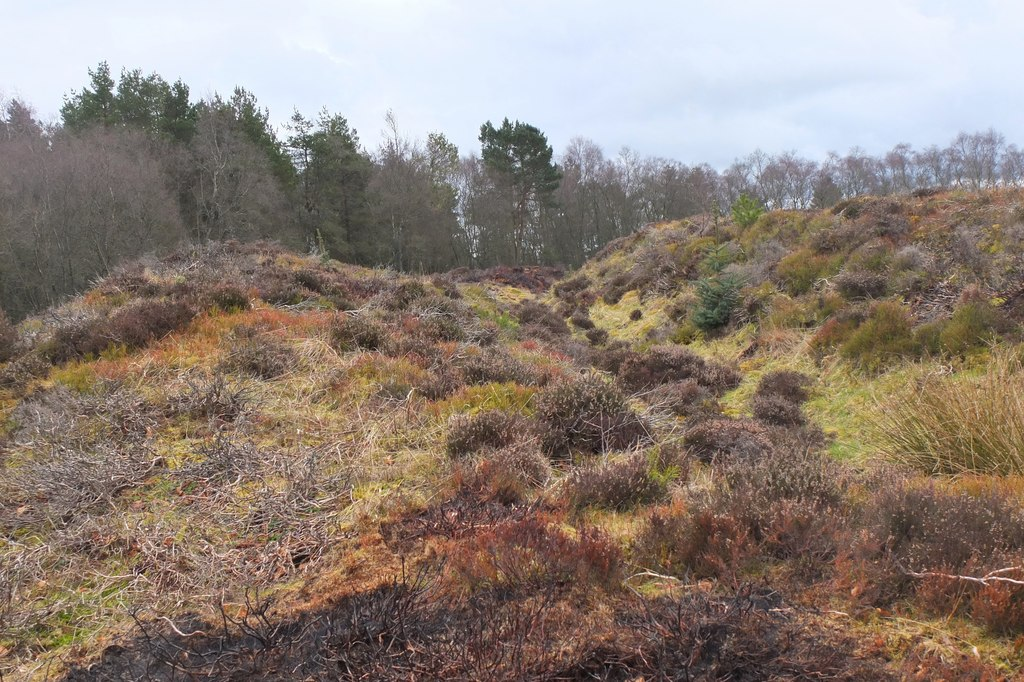
- Ramparts of the fort

- Location within Scottish Borders
- 55°43′54″N 3°11′4″W
- Type: Hillfort
- Periods: Iron Age
- Location: Near Eddleston, Scotland
- OS grid reference: NT 257 493

Site notes
- Area: 0.35 hectares (0.86 acres)

Scheduled monument
- Reference no.: SM731

Northshield Rings is a prehistoric site, a hillfort near the village of Eddleston and about 6 miles (10 km) north of Peebles, in the Scottish Borders, Scotland. It is a Scheduled Monument.

== Description ==
The fort, on a rounded hill a short distance south of Portmore Loch, has well-preserved defences. There is an inner rampart, 73 metres (240 ft) north-north-west to south-south-east by 64 metres (210 ft), enclosing an area of 0.35 hectares (0.86 acres). There are two ramparts outside this. There are three entrances, in the north-west, south and south-east. Within the inner enclosure, seven slight depressions have been found, of diameter 6–9 metres (20–30 ft), thought to be the sites of timber round-houses.

The inner rampart rises up to 0.5 metres (1 ft 8 in) above the interior, and 1.5 metres (4 ft 11 in) above an external ditch. The outer ramparts are more substantial, with external quarry-ditches, providing a defence up to 20 metres (66 ft) deep. It is thought that there were at least two phases of construction; it has been supposed, since the space between the inner rampart and the outer defences is up to 8 metres (26 ft) wide, which would not be there if defences had been strengthened working outwards, that the outer ramparts were built earlier.
