= Posso Tower =

Scottish castle

Location
- Coordinates: 55.586233°N 3.2705239°W

Site history
- Built: 16th century

Posso Tower is a 16th-century tower house, about 6.0 miles (9.7 km) south and west of Peebles, Scottish Borders, Scotland, and west of Manor Water.

== History ==
This was a tower house of the Bairds, which was acquired by the Naesmiths. A new house was built nearby by 1775, by which time the tower was ruined.

Clan member crest badge - Clan Baird

== Structure ==
The tower itself stood towards the north west corner of the site. Its dimensions were 30.75 feet (9.37 m) by 24.5 feet (7.5 m). The walls were over 4.0 feet (1.2 m) at first floor level. While the west wall rises reaches to a little above second-floor level other walls do not go above a single storey. Another building, probably not attached to the tower, lay to the south. Its dimensions were 35.0 feet (10.7 m) by 24.0 feet (7.3 m). A more extensive range, with dimensions 68.0 feet (20.7 m) by 20.5 feet (6.2 m) lay east of the tower; from the centre of its west wall a small wing projected – this may have been a stair tower. There are extensive traces of earth-works, perhaps remnants of garden and orchard, to the south There are five terraces which measure about 95.0 feet (29.0 m) in length, but the breadth varies from 10.0 feet (3.0 m) to 45.0 feet (13.7 m). To the south the remains of an enclosure dyke bound the site, in part running above the north bank of the Tower Burn.

== See also ==
- Castles in Great Britain and Ireland
- List of castles in Scotland
