= Tushielaw Tower =

Scottish castle

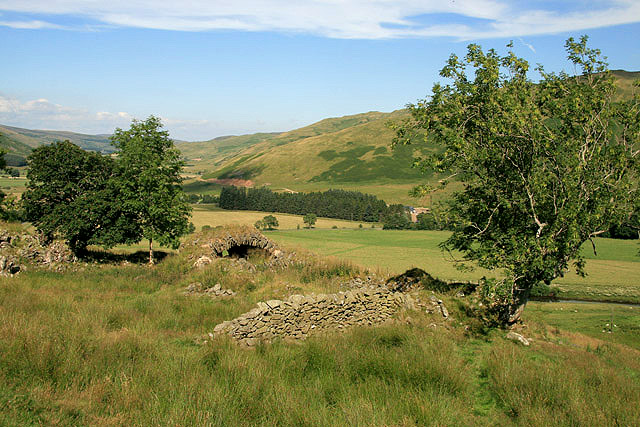
- Remains of Tushielaw Tower

Location
- Coordinates: 55.443579°N 3.1076625°W

Site history
- Built: 16th century

Tushielaw Tower is a 16th-century tower house, about 2.5 miles (4.0 km) north and east of Ettrick, Scottish Borders, Scotland, and west of Ettrick Water.

== History ==
Adam Scott, known as the king of the Borders, or the king of thieves, built the tower in 1507, having received a feu charter from James IV of Scotland. He was beheaded by order of James V of Scotland in 1530, for "theftuously taking Black-maill". A version of the ballad The Dowie Dens of Yarrow may originate in the murder of Walter Scott, son of Robert Scott of Thirlestane by John Scott of Tushielaw.

== Structure ==
Only a basement, fragments of a courtyard, and a ruined outbuilding remain. The basement, which is lit by roughly formed slits in its four walls, has its entry to the west. In the north gable there is an ambry.

== See also ==
- Castles in Great Britain and Ireland
- List of castles in Scotland
