= Wallace's Tower =

Scottish castle

Wallace’s Tower
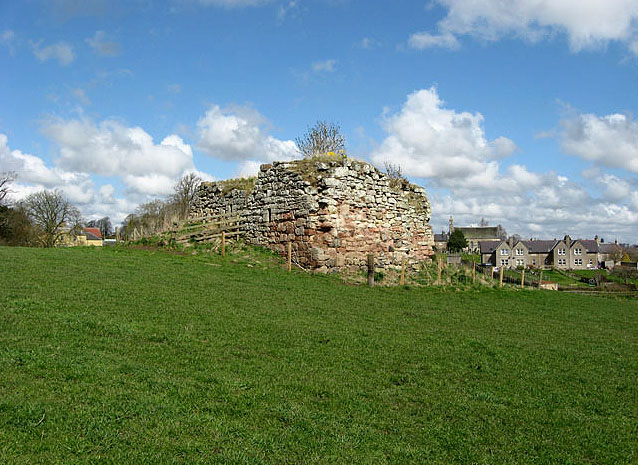
- Wallace's Tower remains

Site information
- Owner: Clan Kerr
- Condition: ruined

Location
- Coordinates: 55.56705°N 2.477074°W

Site history
- Built: 16th century
- Materials: rubble

Scheduled monument
- Official name: Wallace's Tower
- Type: Secular: enclosure; tower
- Designated: 9 December 2025
- Reference no.: SM13812

Wallace's Tower is a ruined 16th-century L-plan tower house, about 3 miles (4.8 km) south west Kelso, Scottish Borders, Scotland, in Roxburgh, west of the River Teviot.

== History ==
The property belonged to the Kerrs of Cessford. A charter of 1543, which confirmed Walter Ker of Cessford as owner of the lands of the East Mains of Roxburgh, mentions the tower. It has been suggested that it formed part of a chain of signal towers created to warn of English incursions.

== Structure ==
The tower comprised a main block, with a vaulted basement, and a stair wing, with a tower added at a corner. The main tower was rectangular, with the wings on its north. One vaulted cellar, which measured 28.5 feet (8.7 m) by 16.5 feet (5.0 m), had two aumbries in the north west wall. There was a service-stair to the north tower, and a door into a vaulted chamber (measuring almost 12 feet (3.7 m) by over 11 feet (3.4 m) with an aumbry in the south west gable) the lowest storey of the south wing. The tower is constructed of freestone rubble. Its windows, which are small, have rounded arises.

== See also ==
- Castles in Great Britain and Ireland
- List of castles in Scotland
- Scheduled monuments in the Scottish Borders
