= Walter Scott of Harden =

Scottish landowner, border reiver and outlaw

Auld Wat of Harden, by Tom Scott

Walter Scott of Harden (1550 – 1629) was a notorious border reiver along the Anglo-Scottish border in the 16th century. He was better known as Auld Wat to distinguish him from his son also named Walter Scott.

== Life ==
The son of William Scott of Harden, Wat was born in 1550, when he was recognised as his father's heir by precept of clare constat, by Alexander Home, 5th Lord Home, his father's feudal superior.

An infamous freebooter, Wat led raids across the border and against his fellow countrymen. In 1592, he was one of those charged with taking part in an attempt to capture King James VI at Falkland Palace, led by the Earl of Bothwell, and was declared a rebel and outlaw.

Scott also participated in the rescue of Kinmont Willie Armstrong, under his chief, Walter Scott of Buccleuch, from Carlisle Castle in 1596.

In 1567, Wat Scott contracted to marry Mary Scott, daughter of John Scott of Dryhope, and known as the "Flower of Yarrow". When supplies were low she allegedly presented a set of spurs on a platter instead of meat, implying that the Scotts should ride out and replenish them from their neighbours' herds.

On 28 June 1592, Wat joined the Earl of Bothwell to attack James VI of Scotland at Falkland Palace. James ordered his house at Harden to be demolished, along with the houses of Tinnis and Dryhope.

Wat married again in 1598 to Margaret Edgar, widow of William Spottiswoode of that ilk, and daughter of John Edgar of Wedderlie.

== Issue ==
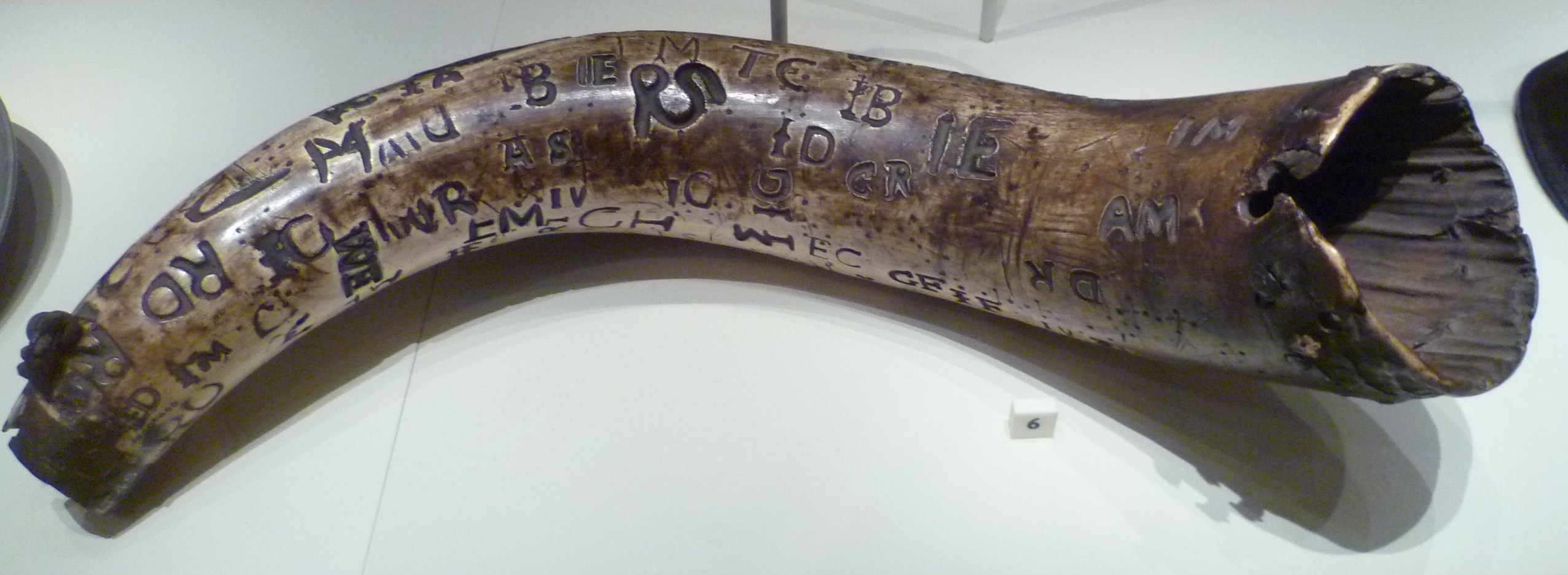
Wat o' Harden's horn in the National Museum of Scotland

Wat Scott had eight legitimate children by his two wives.

By his wife Mary Scott:

- Sir William Scott
- Hugh Scott
- Walter Scott
- Francis Scott
- Margaret Scott
- Esther Scott
- Janet Scott

By his wife Margaret Edgar:

- Margaret Scott

He is also said to have had three illegitimate daughters.
