= Dryhope Tower =

Castle in Scottish Borders, Scotland

Coordinates: 55°30′39″N 3°09′42″W

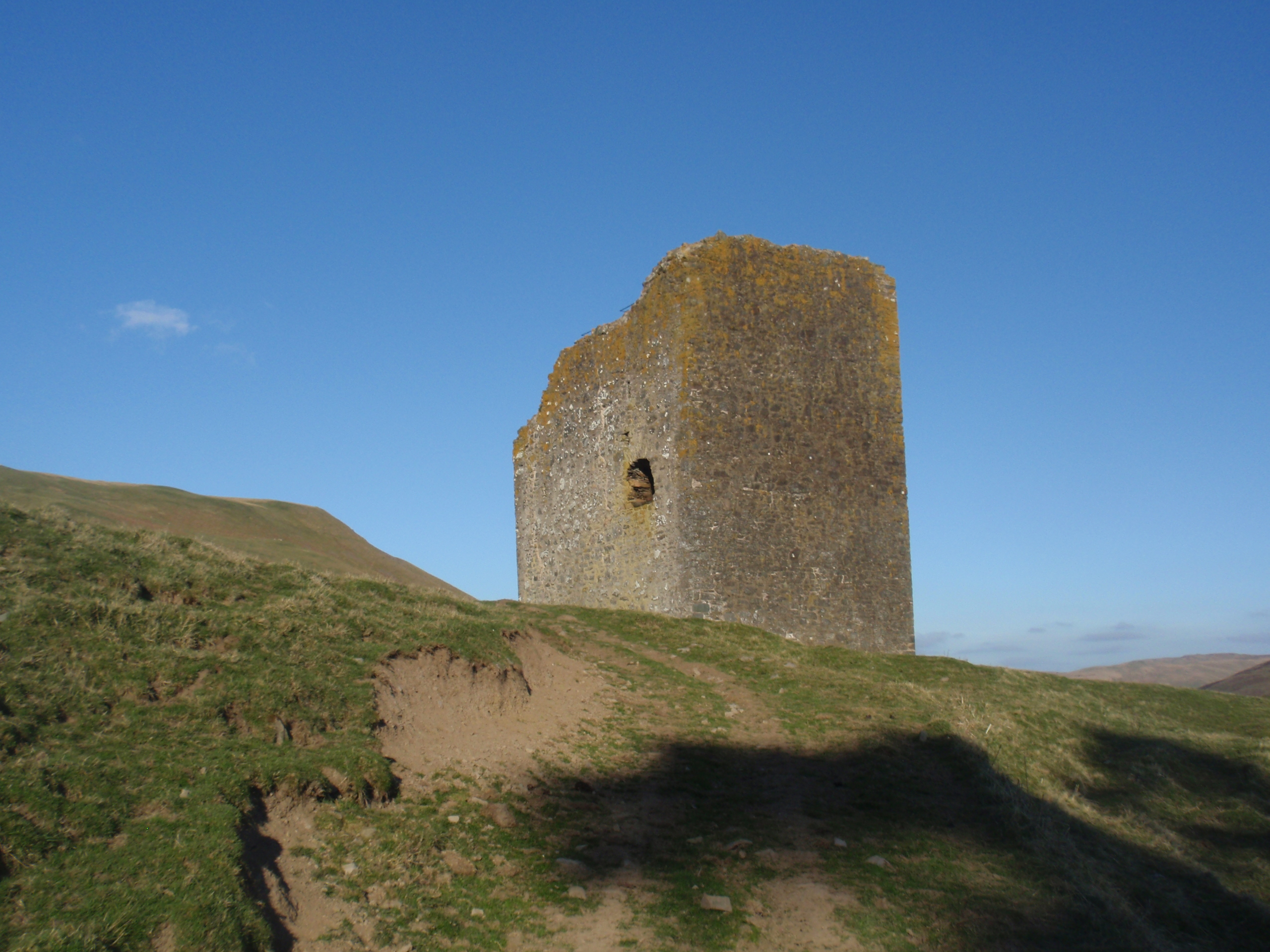
Dryhope Tower

Dryhope Tower is a ruined Scottish peel tower in the valley of the Yarrow Water, in the historic county of Selkirkshire, now part of the Scottish Borders. It lies approximately equidistant between the burghs of Moffat and Selkirk, and defended the north eastern end of St Mary's Loch. The site itself was protected on two sides, to the east by the Dryhope Burn and to the west by the Kirkstead Burn.

== Construction ==
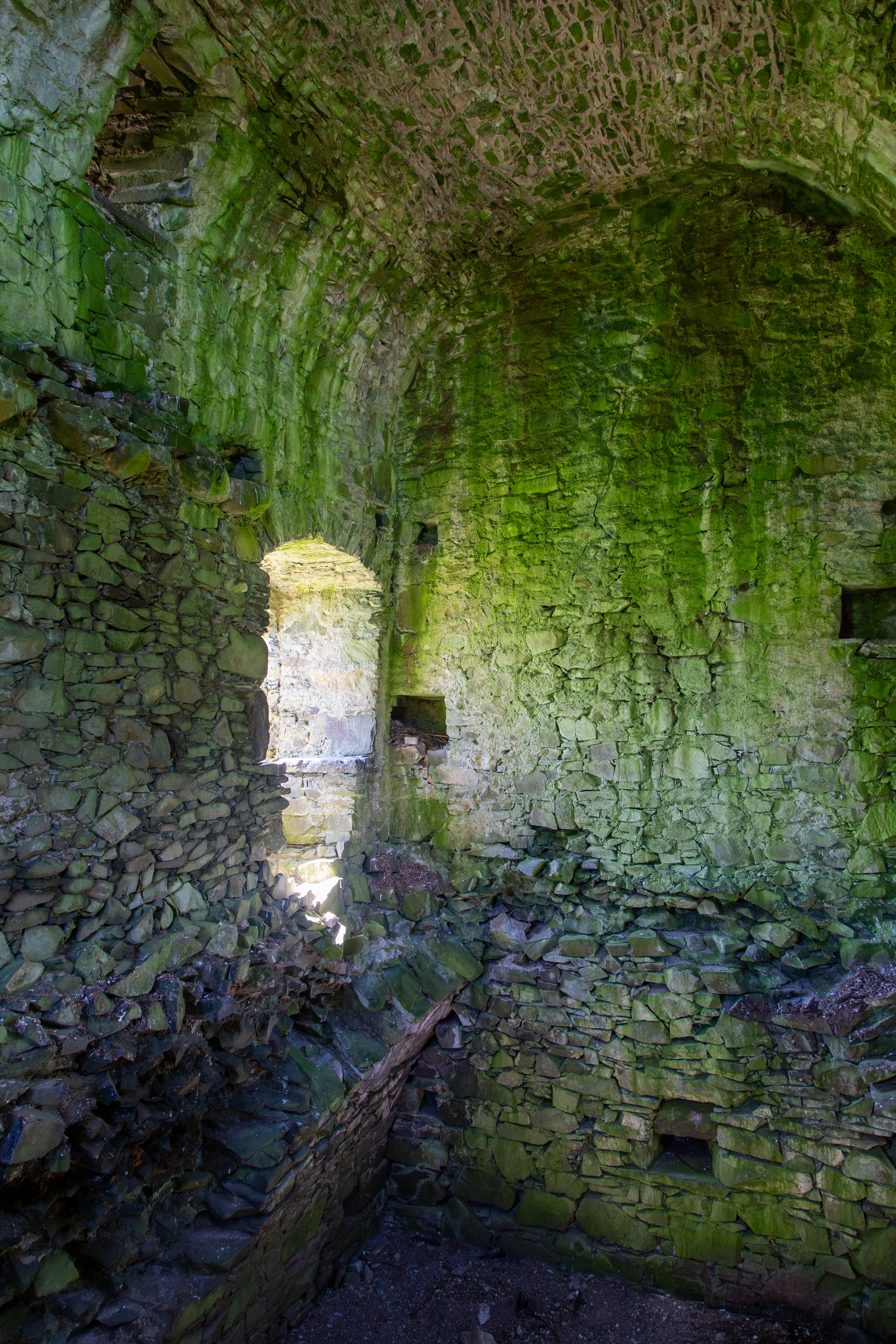
The vault of the basement partially survives, so that the ground floor and first floor can be viewed at the same time.

Built of local stone, Dryhope Tower was originally a four storey building, with the first two storeys of vaulted construction. The tower rests within the remains of a barmkin which also contained other buildings.

== History ==
The tower was likely to have been raised according to a statute of the Parliament of Scotland in 1535, that required large landholders in the Borderlands to build barmkins of stone and lime, sixty square feet in area and with walls of one ell thickness and six ells in height for the resett and defense of him, his tennents, and his gudis in troublous tyme.

The castle belonged to the Scotts of Dryhope, and a daughter of the House, Mary Scott was known as the "Flower of Yarrow" and was also an ancestor of Sir Walter Scott. Mary was given in marriage to Wat Scott of Kirkhope, a notorious Border Reiver. The property passed to Wat Scott's family, the Scotts of Harden, and Scott took possession of Dryhope following his marriage. However, in 1592, Wat Scott fell out of favour with King James VI due to his association with Francis Stewart, 1st Earl of Bothwell, and involvement in an attack on Falkland Palace. King James levied an army and proceeded through the forest and slighted many houses of his opponents. Wat Scott did not get off lightly and Dryhope was amongst Scott of Harden's fortalices that were slighted. The tower seems to have been rebuilt by 1613. The castle fell into terminal decay in the latter part of the 17th century and was acquired by the senior branch of the Scotts, the Dukes of Buccleuch.

Dryhope Tower today belongs to the Philiphaugh Estate, and has recently been undergoing stabilisation work. It has been designated a scheduled monument by Historic Environment Scotland.

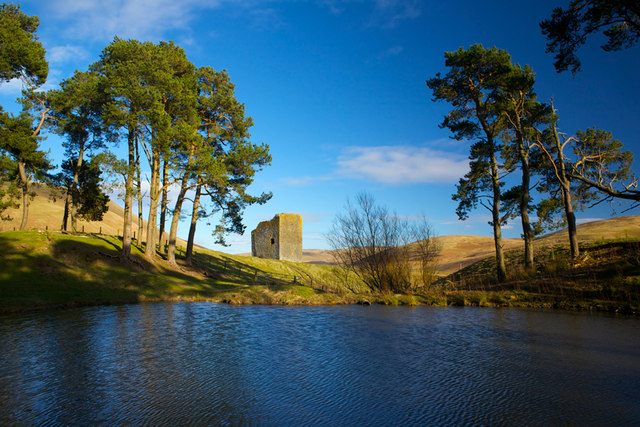
Dryhope Tower in the Landscape; view from Duck Pond

== See also ==
- Cappercleuch, Dryhope
- St Mary's Loch
- List of places in the Scottish Borders
- List of places in Scotland
- Scheduled monuments in the Scottish Borders
