= Evelaw Tower =

Tower house in Scottish Borders, Scotland

Coordinates: 55.7652°N 2.2516°W

Evelaw Tower is a ruined 16th century tower house in Scotland, about 2.5 miles (4.0 km) north west of Westruther, and about 1.5 miles (2.4 km) east of Wedderlie, south of Eve Law.

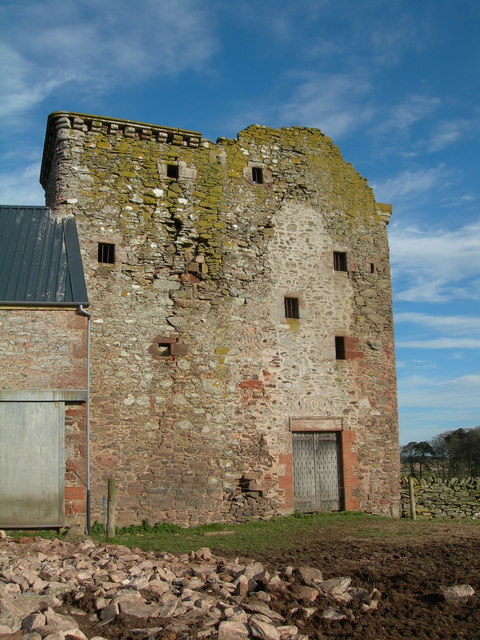

== History ==
The castle belonged to the abbey of Drylaw, but in 1576 it was purchased by the Douglases; subsequently to the Sinclairs of Longformacus acquired it by marriage. In 1731 it was sold to the Smiths.

== Structure ==
Evelaw Tower is an L-plan castle, comprising a main block and a small stair-tower. It has three storeys and a garret. There are wide-splayed gunloops and small windows with iron yetts. The basement of the main block, which contained the kitchens, and the upper floor of the stair-wing, are vaulted. The hall was accessed by a wide turnpike stair from the basement, while access to the private upper rooms was by the turret. The angles are rounded, but corbelled out to square at the level of the eaves. The towers is relatively complete, but there is a large breach in the re-entrant angle. The main block lies east to west; the north wing projects about 3 metres (9.8 ft) from the north west corner. There is a corbel table around the eaves of the main block and the north projecting wing. The construction is of red/purple rubble bonded with lime mortar, with red sandstone dressings. The dimensions are 10.7 metres (35 ft) by 9.7 metres (32 ft). A later entrance has been cut in the wall to the west.

== See also ==
- Castles in Great Britain and Ireland
- List of castles in Scotland
