= Peebles Castle =

Castle in Scottish Borders, Scotland

Coordinates: 55.6513°N 3.1934°W

Peebles Castle was a 12th-century castle built near Peebles, Scotland. Peebles was created a royal burgh by King David I of Scotland in the 12th century. The castle, once a royal castle, was built as a motte-and-bailey castle. Nothing remains above ground.
