= Eddleston =

Village in the Scottish Borders, Scotland

Coordinates: 55.71198°N 3.20651°W

Eddleston: Scottish Gaelic: Baile Ghille Mhoire; Scots: Eddleston
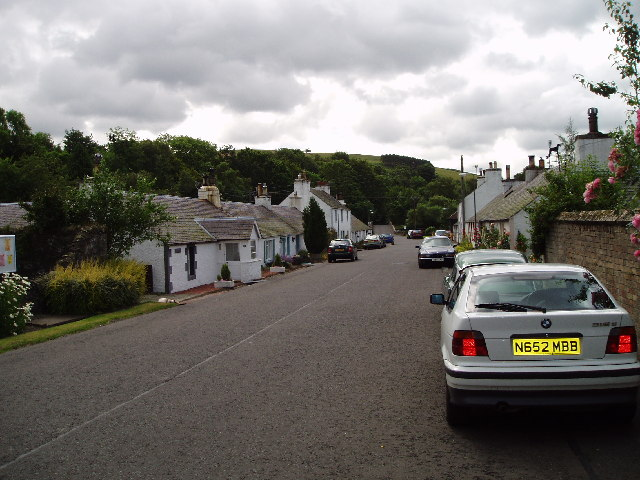
- Population: 550
- Council area: Scottish Borders
- Country: Scotland
- Sovereign state: United Kingdom
- Postcode district: EH45
- Police: Scotland
- Fire: Scottish
- Ambulance: Scottish
- UK Parliament: Dumfriesshire, Clydesdale and Tweeddale
- Scottish Parliament: Midlothian South, Tweeddale and Lauderdale.

Eddleston (Scottish Gaelic: Baile Ghille Mhoire) is a small village and civil parish in the Scottish Borders area of Scotland. It lies 4 miles (6.4 km) north of Peebles and 9 miles (14 km) south of Penicuik on the A703, which passes through the centre of the village. Nearby is the Great Polish Map of Scotland, a large terrain map. The Eddleston Water runs through the village.

According to the 2001 census, there were 129 households, with a population of 335 people, 47% male and 53% female. Eddleston contains a few farms outside of the village centre. Barony Castle (also known by its earlier name of Black Barony), in the village, dates back to the 16th century, and was the property of the Murray Baronets, as was nearby Cringletie, which is now a hotel.

== Etymology ==
Eddleston's earliest recorded name was Penteiacob, in Old Welsh or Brittonic, and meant "headland of James's house". The Anglo-Gaelic of Gillemorestun of the 12th century AD meant "town of St Mary's lad", and gave rise to the current Gaelic name for the village, Baile Ghille Mhoire. It became Edulfstun in 1189 when it was granted to Eadwulf, son of Uhtred. This became Edoluestone (circa 1200) and Edwylstone (circa 1305), and was eventually fully Anglicised to Eddleston by the 14th century.

== The Great Polish Map of Scotland ==
The Great Polish Map of Scotland is a three-dimensional concrete map in the grounds of the Barony Castle Hotel. It was constructed by Polish geographers in the mid-1970s. The map was conceived partly in recognition of the hospitality afforded to Polish soldiers during the Second World War. The idea for the map originated with Jan Tomasik who was the proprietor of the hotel from 1968 to 1981. It was constructed over a three-year period from 1974. In September 2012 the Scottish Culture Secretary announced that the map had been awarded category B listed status.

== Eddleston Primary School ==
Eddleston primary school has been put in abeyance in 2022 following a significant drop in attendance; there is no secondary school, with pupils normally moving on to attend Peebles High School. The school moved to its current building in 1992.

== Film record ==
The Cinema Museum in London holds several home movies shot by Dr. A.G.W. Thomson in the village in the late 1930s, Ref HM154-163

== See also ==
- Darnhall Mains
- Milkieston Rings
- Northshield Rings
- List of places in the Scottish Borders
- List of places in Scotland
- List of rivers of Scotland
