= Harden Castle =

16th century tower house in Scotland

Coordinates: 55.4248°N 2.8715°W

Harden Castle is a 16th-century tower house, about 3.5 miles (5.6 km) west of Hawick, Scottish Borders. It is alternatively known as Harden House or Harden Tower.

The castle is situated strongly, above a deep ravine.

== History ==
The castle, which succeeds an earlier tower which was destroyed about 1590, belonged to the Homes, but was purchased by the Scotts in 1501.

Walter Scott of Harden, known as Auld Wat of Harden, was one of this family. He was a Border Reiver, who married Mary, or Marion, Scott, known as ‘The Flower of Yarrow’, the events surrounding her being retold in the ballad The Dowie Dens o Yarrow.

In the 18th century the family moved to Mertoun; the house was used as a farmhouse. It was restored and reoccupied during the 19th century.

It became the seat of Lord Polwarth.

== Structure ==
The castle incorporates a three-storey tower house; it was extended between 1680 and 1690, with internal changes also, and again when it was reoccupied. The additions were added on the north; so they have not changed the appearance of the south front.

The original block was 74.25 feet (22.63 m) (east to west) by 18.25 feet (5.56 m); the castle was extended 26.66 feet (8.13 m) east in the refurbishment of 1680.

Internal features include plaster ceilings, and fireplaces.

In the grounds there is a bowling green, possibly dating from the 17th century, to the west of the house. And there is a sundial, originally at Dryburgh House, 4 feet (1.2 m) high, with a square dial stone, a twisted shaft, and a moulded base.

It is a category A listed building.
