= Torwoodlee Broch =

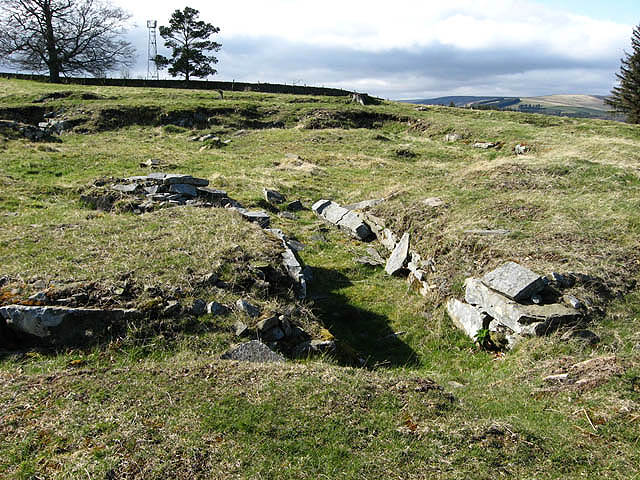
- Torwoodlee broch, entrance

- Location within Scottish Borders
- 55.63688°N 2.850537°W
- Type: Broch
- Periods: Iron Age
- Location: Galashiels

Torwoodlee Broch is the remains of an iron-age broch located near the town of Galashiels in the Scottish Borders.

== Name and etymology ==
No recorded prehistoric name for the broch survives. The monument takes its modern name from the surrounding place-name Torwoodlee, preserved in the landscape of the Scottish Borders near Galashiels.

The first element, tor, derives from a word used in the Brittonic languages of early Britain meaning a rocky hill, peak, or prominent outcrop. The element survives widely in British place-names and is typically used to describe hills crowned with exposed rock or rising prominently from the surrounding landscape. The broch and earlier hillfort occupy a raised ridge above the surrounding ground, making the use of this element consistent with the local topography.

The remaining elements reflect later Old English place-naming. Wudu (modern wood) referred to woodland or forest, while lēah (modern lea or lee) meant a clearing, meadow, or open ground within woodland. The compound name Torwoodlee can therefore be interpreted as "the woodland clearing beside the rocky hill".

As with many archaeological monuments in Britain, the Iron Age structure itself was not originally known by this name. Instead, the broch is identified using the later historic place-name attached to the surrounding estate and landscape.

The term broch derives from the Scots word brough, meaning a fortified place or stronghold, and is used in archaeology to describe the distinctive drystone tower structures built in northern Scotland during the Scottish Iron Age.

== Description ==
Torwoodlee Broch (grid reference NT46553847) is situated on the site of an earlier hillfort on the shoulder of a ridge near Galashiels in the Scottish Borders. The hillfort is irregularly oval in shape, measuring about 137 by 136 metres (137 by 136 m (449 by 446 ft)). The broch itself lies on the southwest side of the fort and partly on top of its defences.

The broch is circular in plan, with an external diameter of about 23.2 m (76 ft). Its outer wall measures approximately 5.2 m (17 ft) in thickness at the base, enclosing a central court about 12 m (39 ft) in diameter. Like other broch towers, it was built from large local stones arranged in a double-wall construction. Two concentric stone walls form a hollow cavity between them, allowing for internal stairs, guard chambers and galleries within the wall thickness while giving the structure considerable stability.

The broch entrance survives as a stone-lined passage running through the thickness of the wall and opening into the central court. Such passages were typically narrow and roofed with stone lintels, allowing entry to be controlled and defended. Similar architectural features can be seen in well-preserved broch towers such as the Broch of Mousa in Shetland.

Torwoodlee forms part of a wider landscape of broch sites in the region. The monument lies about 3.2 km (2.0 mi) south of Bow Castle Broch, suggesting that this part of the Scottish Borders once contained a network of fortified Iron Age settlements positioned to watch over movement through the surrounding valleys.

Today the monument appears as a low circular mound of collapsed masonry within the earthworks of the earlier hillfort. The surviving foundations mark the footprint of what was once a substantial stone tower dominating the ridge.

== Excavations ==
The broch was first cleared out by James Curle in 1891 at which time much Roman pottery and glass, together with a 1st-century AD coin were found inside it.

It was systematically excavated in 1950 by Stuart Piggott. More Roman pottery and glass was found beneath the wall of the broch. The broch appears to have been built soon after the Romans withdrew from Scotland in about 100 AD, and was thrown down again shortly afterwards, perhaps by a Roman expedition preparing for the reoccupation of 140 AD. The many fragments of Roman material found in the broch might be explained as loot from the nearby legionary fort at Newstead (Trimontium).
