= Black Barony =

Hotel in the Scottish Borders

Coordinates: 55°42′46″N 3°13′01″W

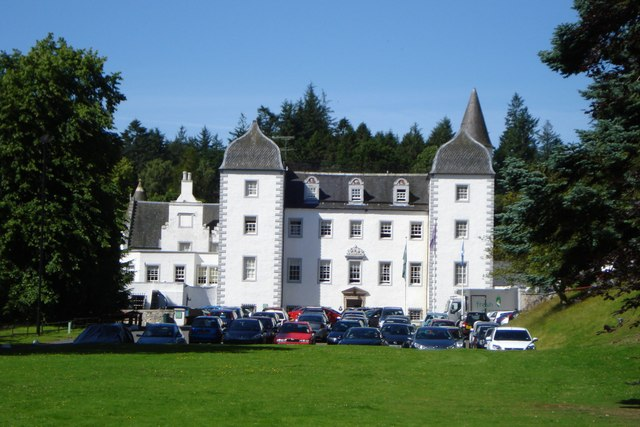
Barony Castle

Barony Castle, also known as Black Barony, and formerly as Darnhall, is a historic house at Eddleston in the Scottish Borders. The house is currently operated as a hotel, under the name of Barony Castle Hotel, and is protected as a Category B listed building. Situated within the grounds lies the Great Polish Map of Scotland, a large relief model of Scotland, the largest of such in Europe.

== History ==
The remains of a 16th-century tower house, built by the Murrays of Blackbarony, form the oldest part of the building. Sir Alexander Murray, 2nd Baronet, purchased the nearby estate of Cringletie in 1666. Sir Archibald Murray, 3rd Baronet (died c. 1700) was a soldier and from 1689 served as "Sole Master of Work, Overseer, and Director-General of their Majesties' buildings" to King William II and Queen Mary II, filling the post which had been vacant since Sir William Bruce's dismissal in 1678.

The house was extended in the 18th century, resulting in the present facade. In 1771 Black Barony passed to the Murrays of Elibank, who retained ownership until 1930. Further enlargements were made in the 19th century, and in the first half of the 20th century the house was converted to hotel use.

In 1843 James Gillespie Graham was commissioned to replace the whole structure with a new mansionhouse, but this was never progressed. Instead smaller extensions were made in the late 19th century under the 9th and 10th Lord Elibank.

During the Second World War, Black Barony at Eddleston near Peebles was requisitioned for military use and in 1942 became The Polish Higher Military School used for staff officer training. Poland had been invaded by Nazi Germany, Soviet Russia and Slovakia. Many Polish military personnel escaped via Romania to France and the United Kingdom. After the Fall of France in May 1940, many more Polish forces arrived in the UK. Most Polish land forces were deployed to Scotland and so Black Barony and other sites were requisitioned for the use of the Polish forces stationed in Scotland. These included the 10th Armoured Cavalry Brigade commanded by General Stanisław Maczek, which formed the nucleus of the 1st Polish Armoured Division organised in February 1942. Polish forces were initially deployed throughout Scotland for the defence of Scotland's East Coast against possible invasion by Nazi German forces in Norway and Denmark. The Poles provided the defence of many areas and vital services such as patrolling and guarding beaches, ports, estuaries, airfields and radar sites. They operated anti-aircraft guns and barrage balloons and installed tank obstacles.

=== Ice House ===
An underground, ovoid structure, dated 1789 was constructed 100 m to the north-east of the house by the 7th Lord Elibank.
