= Blackhope Scar =

Hill in Scotland

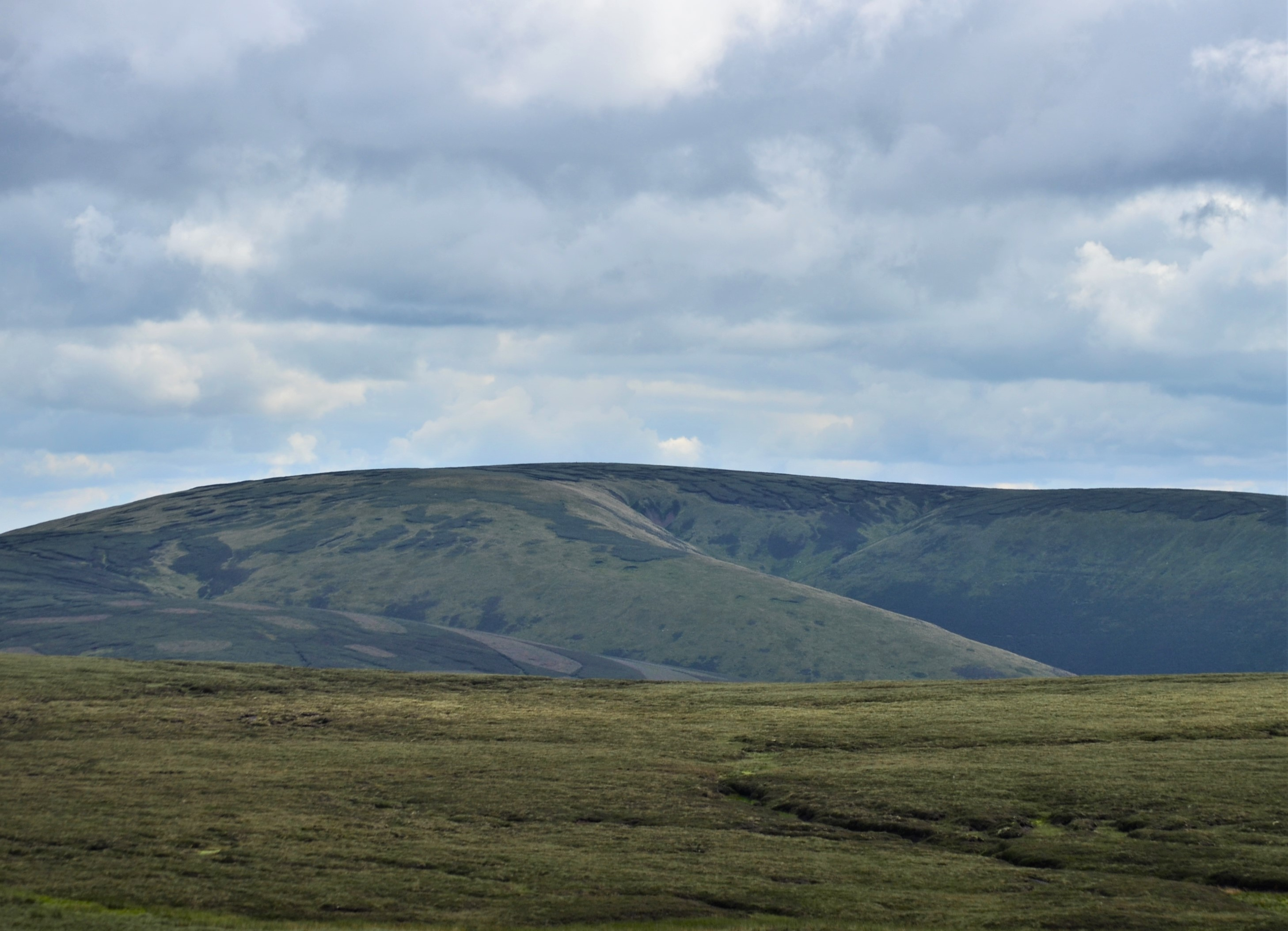

Highest point
- Elevation: 651 m (2,136 ft)
- Prominence: 282 m (925 ft)
- Listing: Ma,Hu,Tu,Sim, G, D,CoH,CoU,CoA,DN,Y)
- Coordinates: 55°43′25″N 3°05′30″W

Geography
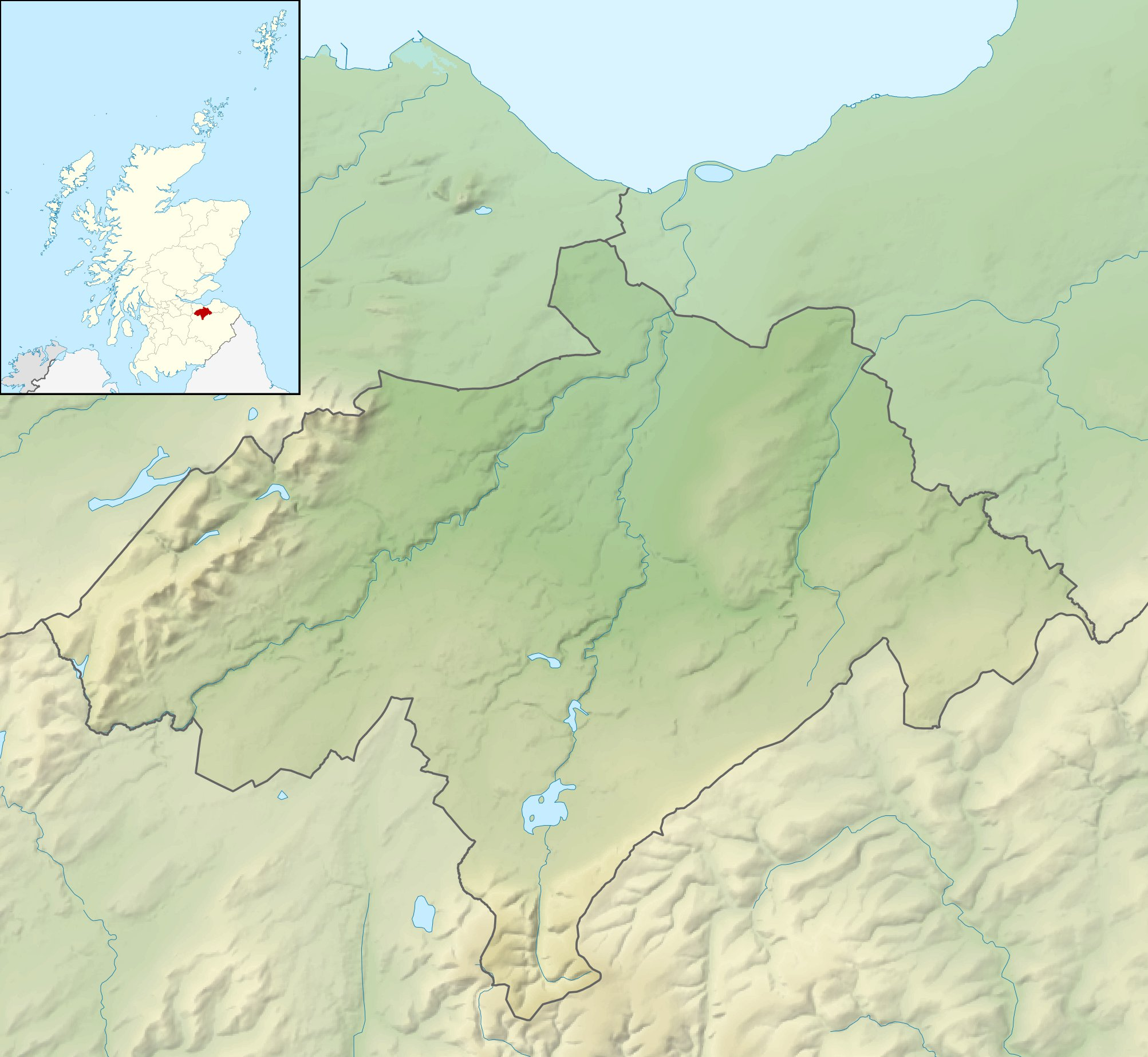
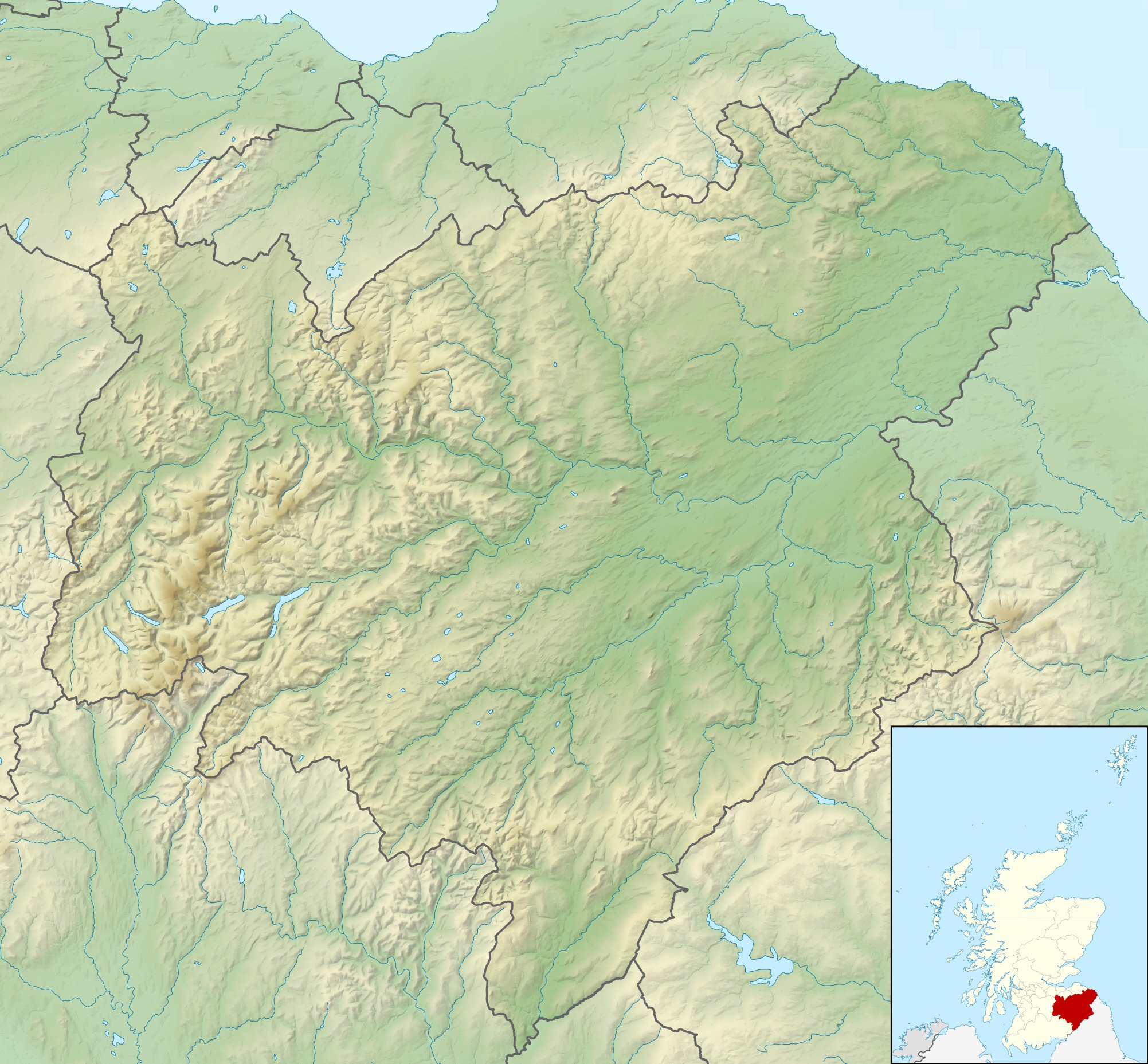
- Location within Midlothian Location within Scottish Borders Location within Scotland
- Location: Scottish Borders, Midlothian, Scotland
- Parent range: Moorfoot Hills, Southern Uplands
- OS grid: NT 31512 48324
- Topo map: OS Landranger 73

Blackhope Scar is a hill in the Moorfoot Hills range, part of the Southern Uplands of Scotland. It lies to the northeast of the town of Peebles and is the second highest of the Moorfoot Hills after Windlestraw Law.

A rough, boggy moorland hill, it is usually climbed from the Gladhouse Reservoir and offers fine views from its summit.
