= William Archer Porter Tait =

Scottish civil engineer (1866–1929)

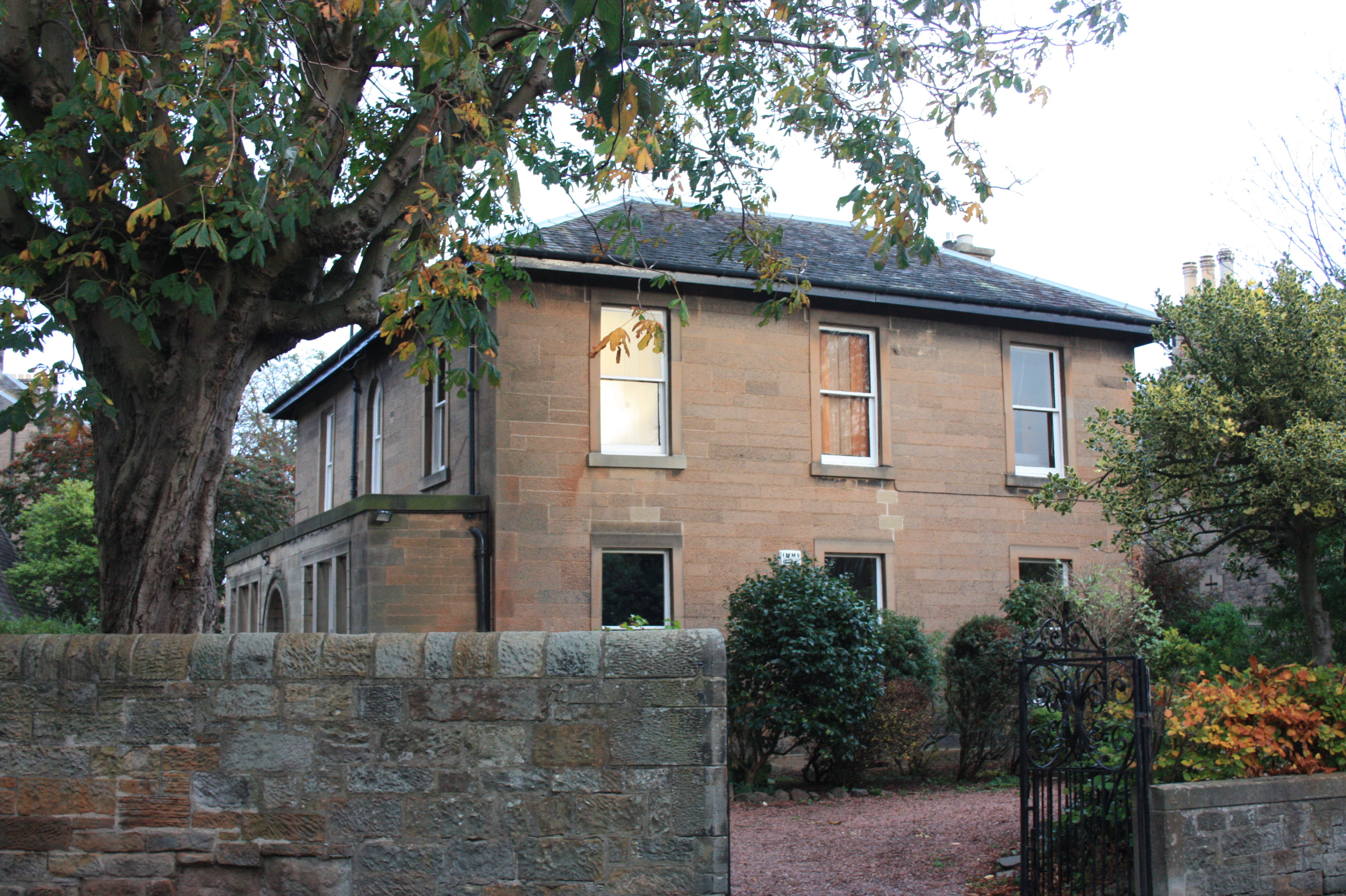
Tait's birthplace at 6 Greenhill Gardens, Edinburgh

William Archer Porter Tait FRSE FRMS MICE (1866–1929) was a 19th/20th century Scottish civil engineer, and part of the Guthrie Tait dynasty. He was Vice President of the Institute of Civil Engineers in 1929.

== Life ==
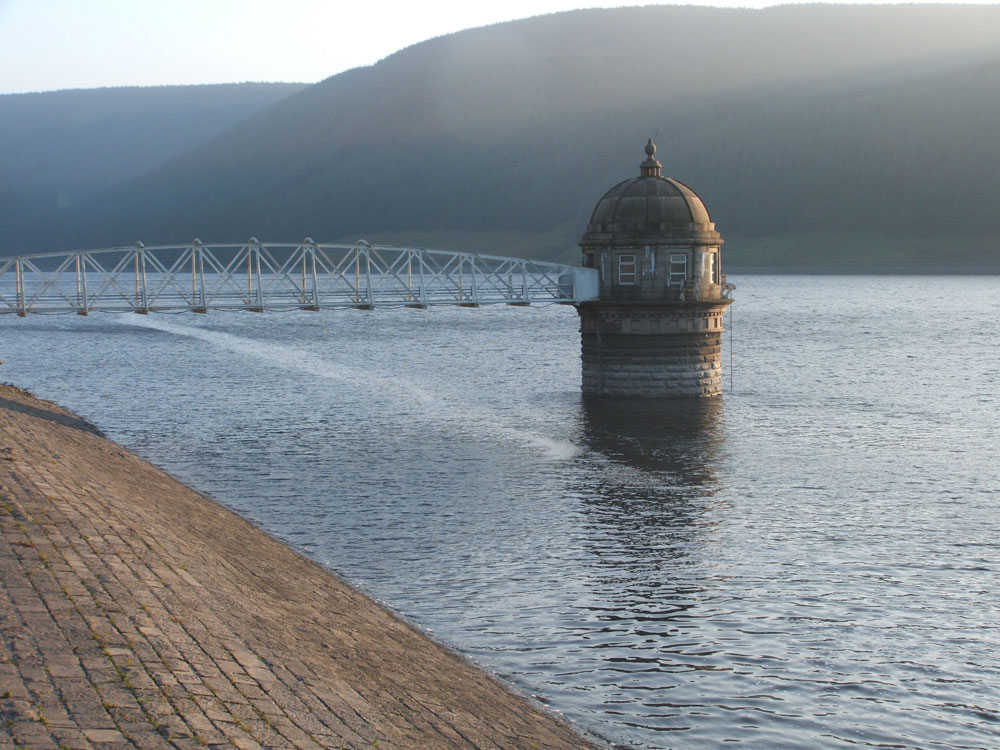
Talla Reservoir

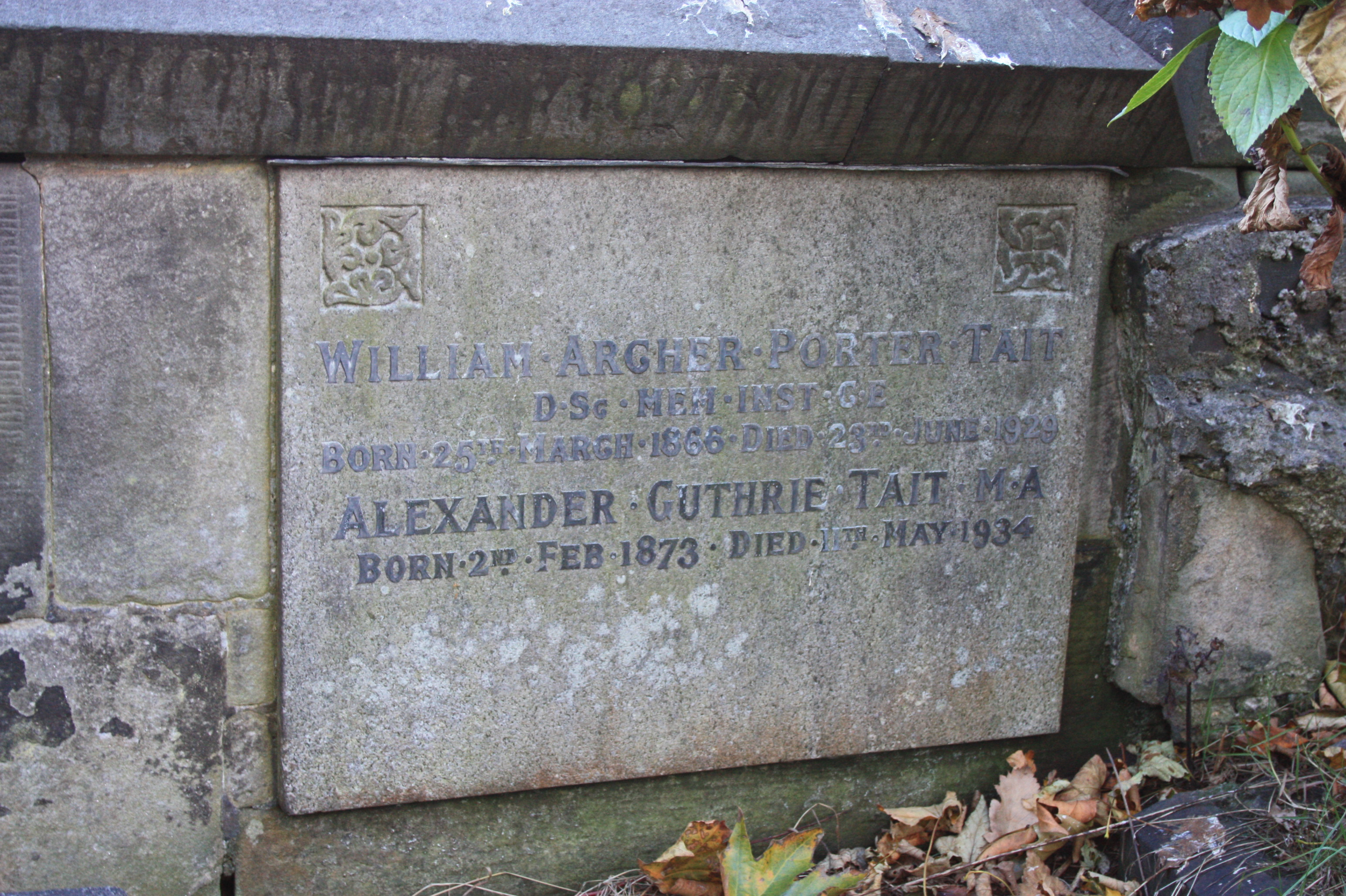
The grave of William Archer Porter Tait, St John's, Edinburgh

William Tail was born on 25 March 1866, at 6 Greenhill Gardens in south-east Edinburgh, the second son of Peter Guthrie Tait and his wife, Margaret Porter. He was named after his maternal uncle, William Archer Porter.

He was educated at Edinburgh Academy. From 1881, he studied engineering at Edinburgh University under Prof Fleeming Jenkin, graduating BSc in 1885. He was then apprenticed for a year at Brown Brothers Engineering on Broughton Road in Edinburgh. In 1886/7 he did work creating the Lanarkshire and Ayrshire Railway. In 1887 he was articled to Sir John Wolfe Barry then to Henry Marc Brunel. Here he worked on the foundations of Tower Bridge and on the Barry Docks. He continued with Wolfe Barry for three years after his articles were complete, and accompanied him on several court hearings

He returned to Scotland in 1891 as assistant engineer to the Glasgow Subway project under Charles de Neuville Forman. In August 1894 he joined Leslie and Reid alongside Alexander Leslie to replace Robert Carstairs Reid. His main project was Talla Reservoir on the Talla Water in the Scottish Borders which played a major role in serving Edinburgh and allowing its expansion.

In 1898, he was elected a Fellow of the Royal Society of Edinburgh. His proposers were William Thomson, Lord Kelvin, Charles Alexander Stevenson, George Barclay and John Sturgeon Mackay. He received an honorary doctorate (DSc) from the University of Edinburgh in 1910. He served as Vice President to the Society from 1921 to 1924.

In 1910, he had offices at 72 George Street in Edinburgh's First New Town and lived at 38 George Square.

Tait died in Edinburgh on 23 June 1929. He is buried with his parents and siblings in st John's churchyard at the west end of Princes Street in Edinburgh. The grave lies on one of the lower eastern terraces, behind a grey granite Celtic cross to his brother, Frederick Guthrie Tait.

He bequeathed his collection of legal books to the library at One Great George Street in London.

== Family ==
Tait's siblings included John Guthrie Tait and Frederick Guthrie Tait.

== Publications ==
- The Talla Water Supply of Edinburgh (1907)
