= Edgelaw Reservoir =

Reservoir in Midlothian, Scotland - correction, one mile west of Temple

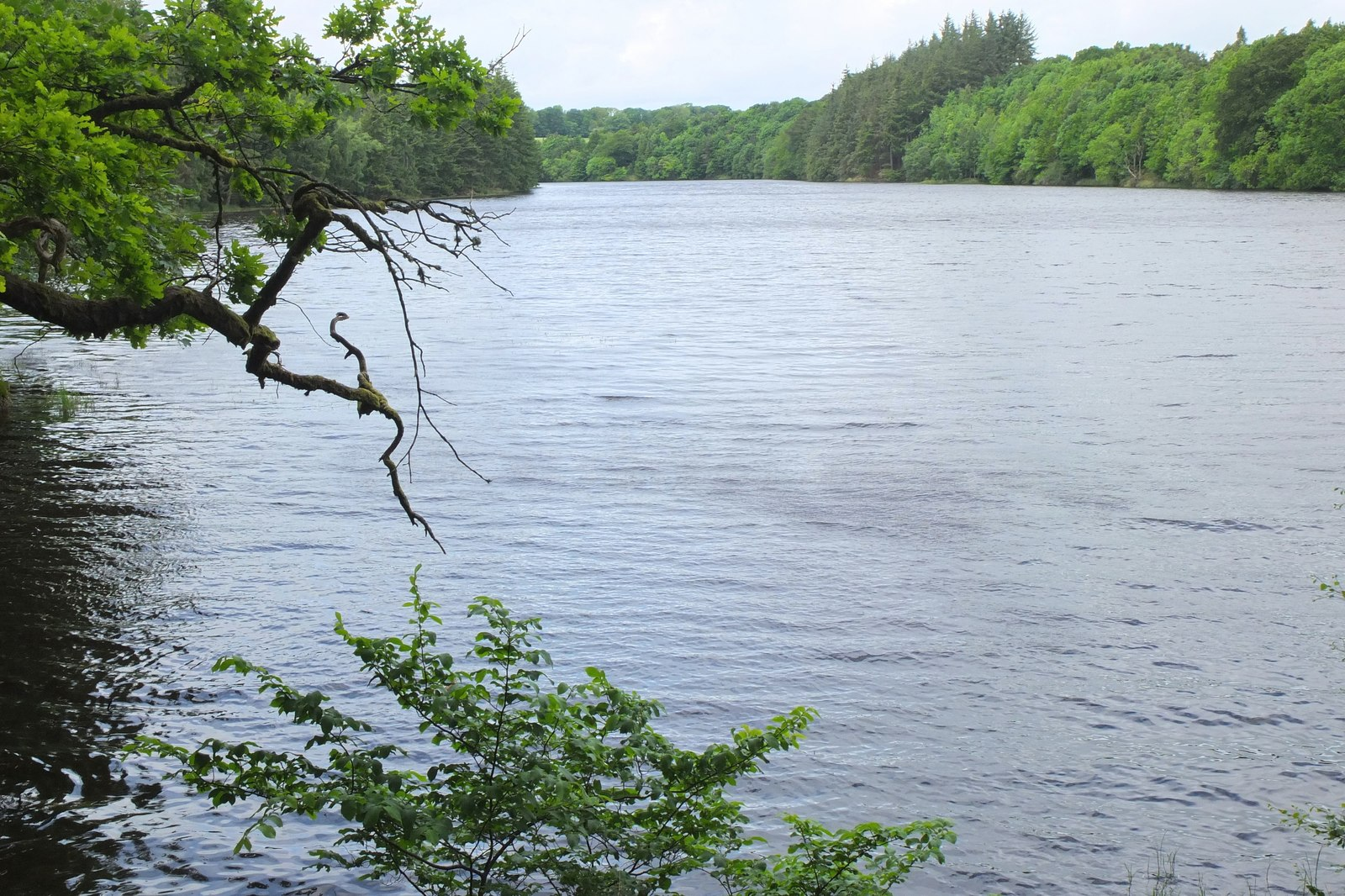

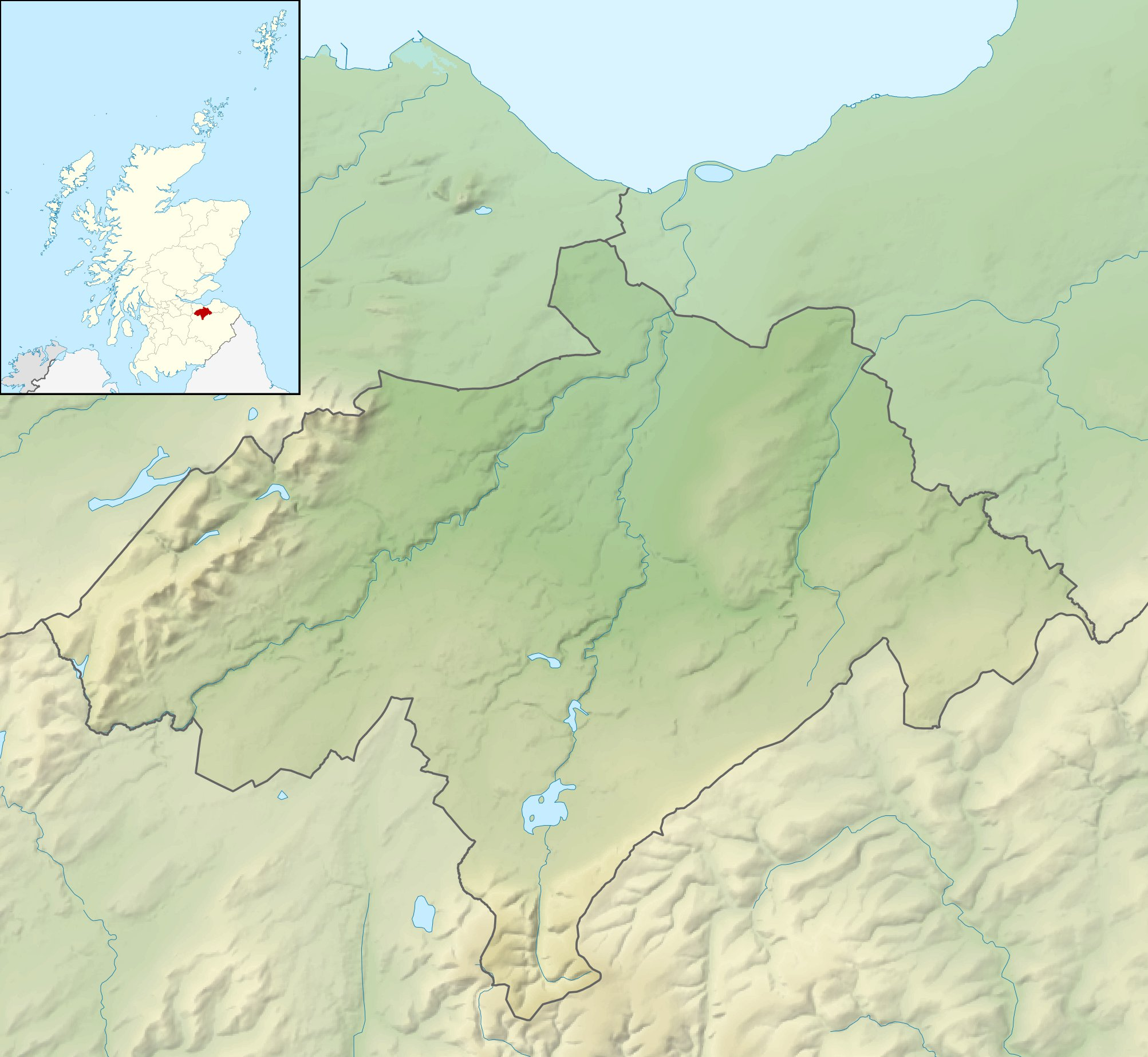
- Location within Midlothian
- Location: Midlothian, Scotland
- Coordinates: 55°48′43″N 3°7′9″W
- Type: reservoir
- Basin countries: United Kingdom

Edgelaw Reservoir is an artificial reservoir in Midlothian, Scotland, UK, four miles west of Temple.

It was created in 1880 by James Leslie and his son Alexander.

== See also ==
- Gladhouse Reservoir
- Glencorse Reservoir
- North Esk Reservoir
- Rosebery Reservoir
- List of reservoirs and dams in the United Kingdom
