= Dundreich =

Hill in the Southern Uplands of Scotland

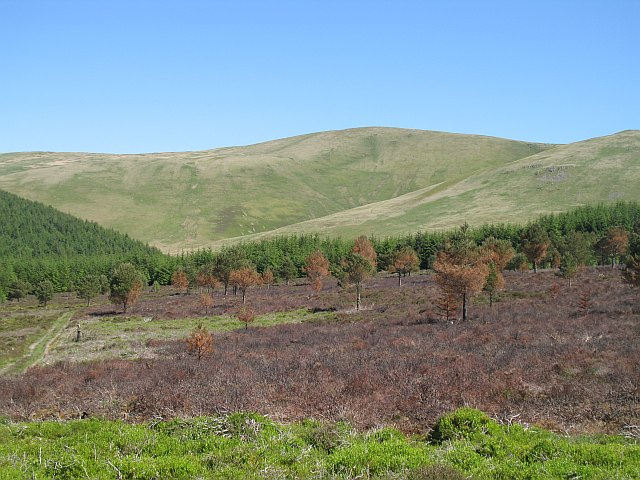

Highest point
- Elevation: 623 m (2,044 ft)
- Prominence: 67 m (220 ft)
- Listing: Tu,Sim,D,GT,DN

Geography
- Location: Scottish Borders, Scotland
- Parent range: Moorfoot Hills, Southern Uplands
- OS grid: NT 27465 49086
- Topo map: OS Landranger 73

Dundreich is a hill in the Moorfoot Hills range, part of the Southern Uplands of Scotland. Its close proximity to Edinburgh allows for an almost unimpeded view towards the city, as well as into the Pentland Hills and surrounding counties. Tied with Whitehope Law as the lowest Moorfoot Donald, it is most frequently climbed from the Gladhouse Reservoir to the north, often as part of a round of the neighbouring hills.
