= Moorfoot Hills =

Range of hills in east central Scotland

Coordinates: 55°44′N 3°05′W

View of the Moorfoots from the north

The Moorfoot Hills are a range of hills south of Edinburgh in east central Scotland, one of the ranges which collectively form the Southern Uplands.

== Etymology ==
The name Moorfoot was recorded as Morthwait in 1142. The second element is Old Norse þveit meaning "clearing, meadow, paddock". The first element may be Norse mór or Old English mōr, both meaning "moor, heath".

== Geology ==
The range is formed from three similar successions of wackes and siltstones known as the Portpatrick Formation, the Shinnel Formation and 'Gala Unit 2', the first two are sub-units of the Scaur Group, the last a sub-unit of the Gala Group. The Portpatrick Formation originated during the Caradoc age of the Ordovician period whilst the Shinnel Formation spanned the Caradoc and the succeeding Ashgill age. The Gala Group strata are of Rhuddanian age, i.e. earliest Silurian. It is the Portpatrick Formation which forms the main northwest facing scarp. There are also small fault-related intercalations of the Moffat Shales in places, particularly within the Shinnel Formation. A disused quarry which formerly exploited an isolated granite intrusion sits to the west of the B7007 road at Broad Law.

The scarp lies immediately to the southeast of the Lammermuir Fault, a Caledonoid fault with a downthrow to the northwest. To its southeast and parallel with it are three further NE-SW aligned reverse faults which are associated with the final stages of the closure of the Iapetus Ocean during the Caledonian orogeny, as are the sedimentary rocks which they affect. The southernmost is known as the Orlock Bridge Fault, a structure which can be traced southwest into Ireland and the northernmost of the three is the Fardingmullach Fault. Two strike slip faults are mapped affecting the rock sequence an disrupting the faults already noted; both can be tied with landscape features. The more westerly coincides with the north–south alignment of the upper course of the South River Esk, Lothian and continues south through the range. Further east, a similar fault defines the course of the Dewar Burn and continues north through Peat Hill to Whitelaw Cleugh near the northeastern end of the main scarp.

Since the last ice age, peat deposits have accumulated particularly around the plateau surfaces surrounding Blackhope Scar and Jeffries Corse.

== Hills ==
The range runs from Peebles in the Scottish Borders, in a north easterly direction to Tynehead near the A7 road in Midlothian. The highest point of the Moorfoot Hills is Windlestraw Law, at 659 metres. Parts of the Moorfoot Hills are designated a Special Area of Conservation. The hills in the range over 2000 ft are:

Summit	Height (m)	Listing
Dundreich	623	Tu, Sim, D, GT, DN
Jeffries Corse	613	xDT
Bowbeat Hill	626	Tu, Sim, D, GT, DN
Blackhope Scar	651	Ma, Hu, Tu, Sim, G, D, CoH, CoU, CoA, DN, Y
Whitehope Law	623	Tu, Sim, D, GT, DN
Bareback Knowe	656	DT, sSim
Windlestraw Law	659.2	Ma, Hu, Tu, Sim, G, D, DN, Y

The Hills are also home to Bowbeat Wind Farm which is owned by E.on. The site consists of 24 Nordex N60 turbines which lie between Bowbeat Hill, Blackhope Scar and Dundreich Hill. The wind farm was completed in September 2002 and at the time was Scotland's largest wind farm.

== See also ==
- Peatrig Hill
- List of places in the Scottish Borders
- List of places in Midlothian
- List of places in Scotland
