= Alexander Leslie (engineer) =

Scottish civil engineer

Alexander Leslie FRSE PRSSA (16 September 1844 – 7 December 1893) was a Scottish civil engineer. He served as President of the Royal Scottish Society of Arts from 1890 until his premature death in 1893. He specialised in harbour works and reservoirs.

== Life ==
Spillway, Edgelaw Reservoir

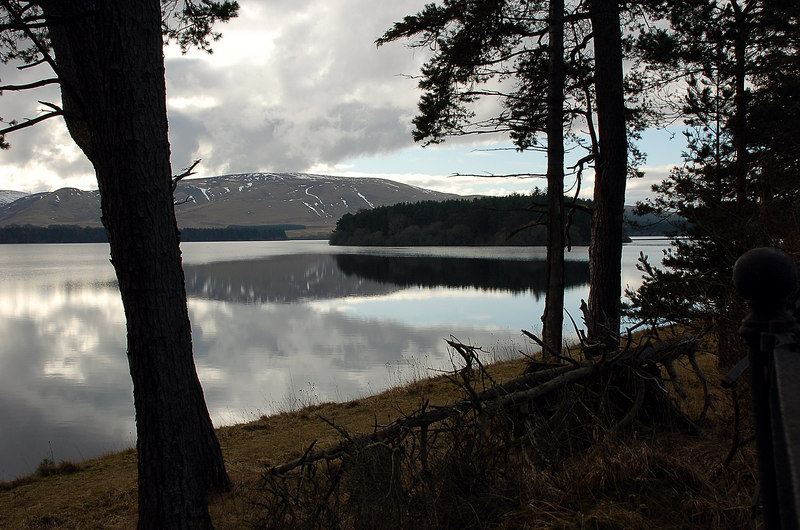
Gladhouse Reservoir

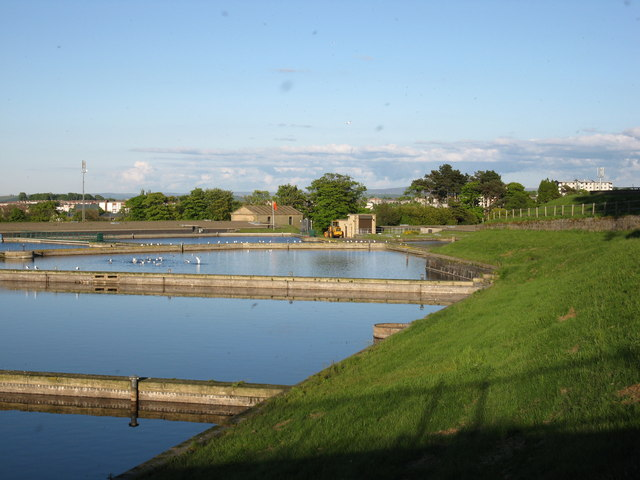
Alnwickhill Waterworks

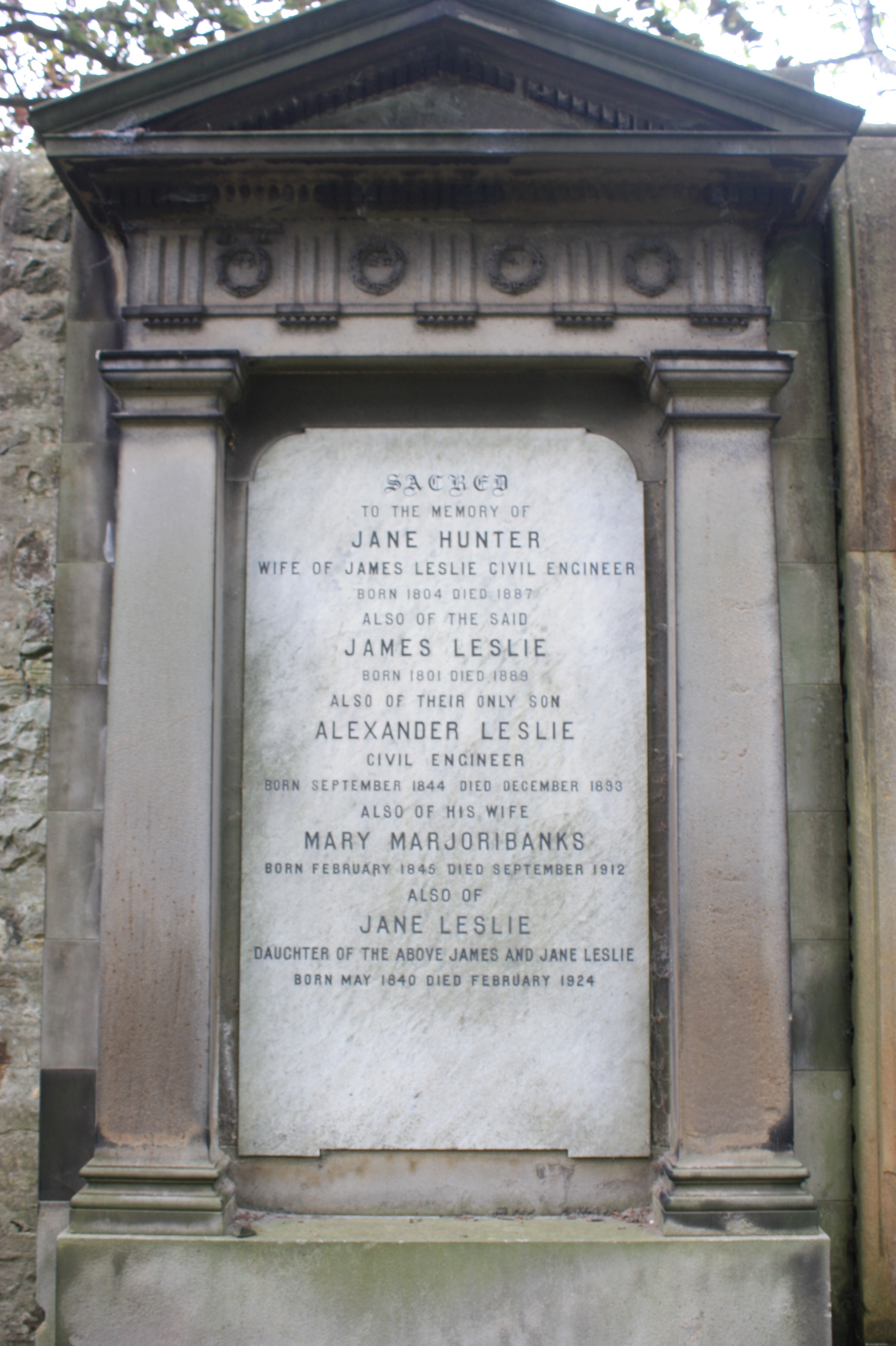
The grave of Alexander Leslie and his parents, Dean Cemetery, Edinburgh

He was born in Dundee on 16 September 1844 the son of the civil engineer James Leslie and his wife Jane Hunter (1804-1887).

He was educated at the Edinburgh Institution (now Stewarts Melville) then studied mathematics at the University of Edinburgh. In 1862 he joined the offices of David and Thomas Stevenson as a trainee lighthouse and harbour engineer. He worked here for three years and his projects included a new breakwater at Wick. He then briefly gained extra experience as a land surveyor with a Mr Macbey of Elgin before joining the firm of Morkle & Prodham working on the Blaydon and Conside Railway. From 1865 he was also partially employed in his father's office, and in 1871 he was created a Partner, and came to aid his father in several projects, the firm thereafter being called J & A Leslie.

In 1882 he was elected a Fellow of the Royal Society of Edinburgh his proposers being Thomas Stevenson and Peter Guthrie Tait.

In 1881, prior to his father's death (in 1889) a further partnership was created with his brother-in-law, Robert Carstairs Reid (1845–1894), to create Leslie & Reid. Robert had earlier been a school friend and probably through this connection met his sister, Charlotte Leslie (1846–1935). On Reid's death he took on William Archer Porter Tait.

He died on 7 December 1893 aged 49. He is buried with his parents in Dean Cemetery.

== Projects ==
- Alnwickhill Reservoir (1875) plus second phase in 1888
- Water Tower in Dalkeith (1879)
- Gladhouse Reservoir (1879)
- Edgelaw Reservoir (1880)
- Rosebery Reservoir (1880)
- Paisley water supply (1881)
- Williamwath Bridge, Dumfriesshire (1882)
- Reservoir on the Gask Burn in Perthshire (1887)
- Alnwickhill Reservoir (1888) created a listed building in 1996
- Reservoir serving Leven in Fife (1889)

== Family ==
He was married to Mary Marjoribanks (1845–1912).

His great uncle was the eminent mathematician John Leslie.
