= Robert Carstairs Reid =

Scottish civil engineer

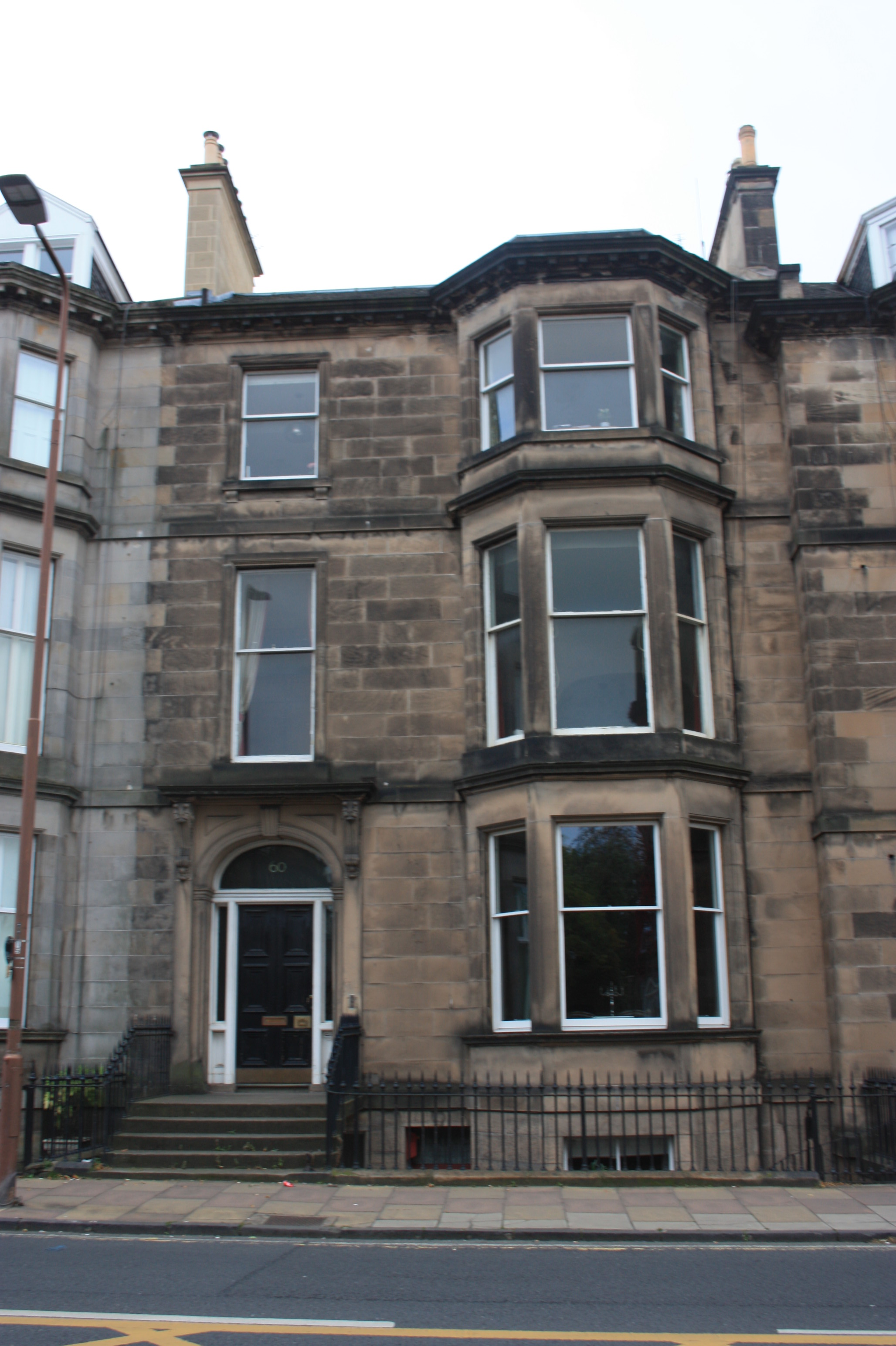
60 Palmerston Place, Edinburgh

Robert Carstairs Reid (6 December 1845–4 March 1894) was a 19th-century Scottish civil engineer. He specialised in harbour works and water supply.

== Life ==
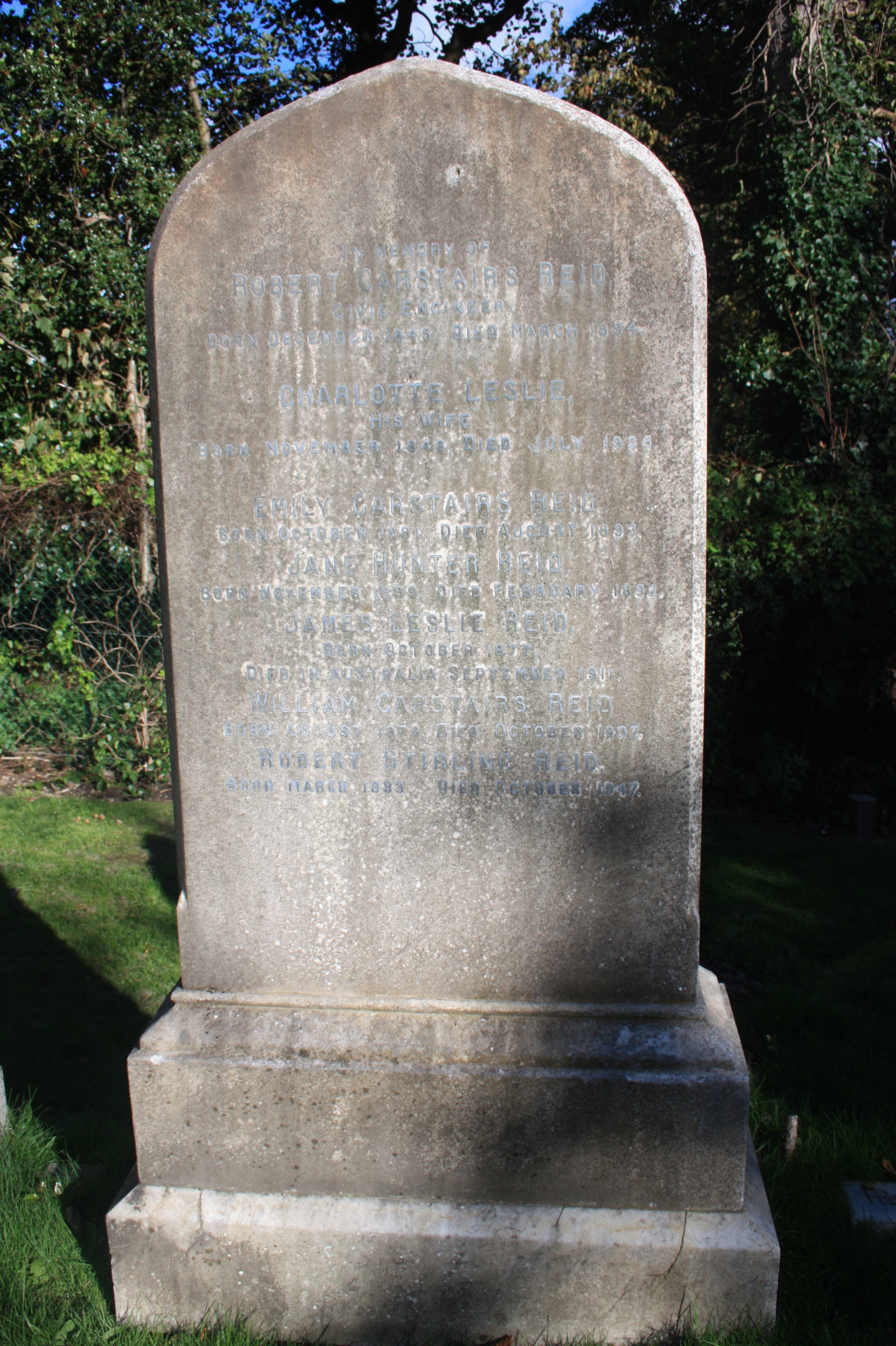
The grave of Robert Carstairs Reid, Dean Cemetery

He was born in Kettle, Fife on 6 December 1845, the second son of Amelia Carstairs (1818-1890) and her husband, Rev William Reid (1810-1884) the local minister.

He was educated at the Edinburgh Institution then studied civil engineering at the University of Edinburgh before joining the office of James Leslie. His first major project was Thornhill Waterworks. He then did various surveys before working on the Lintrathen Extension to Dundee's Waterworks and the Moorfoot Extension to Edinburgh's Waterworks.

In 1881 he became a partner with his friend, creating J & A Leslie & Reid, engineers. Their main work was upgrading Paisley's water supply.

He died at home, 60 Palmerston Place in Edinburgh's West End on 4 March 1894. He is buried in Dean Cemetery in western Edinburgh. The grave lies on the south side of the south-west spur.

== Family ==
In 1875 he married Charlotte Leslie (1846-1935) sister of his schoolfriend and later business partner Alexander Leslie. Their children included William Carstairs Reid FRSE (d.1937).
