= Bowbeat Hill =

Hill in the Southern Uplands of Scotland

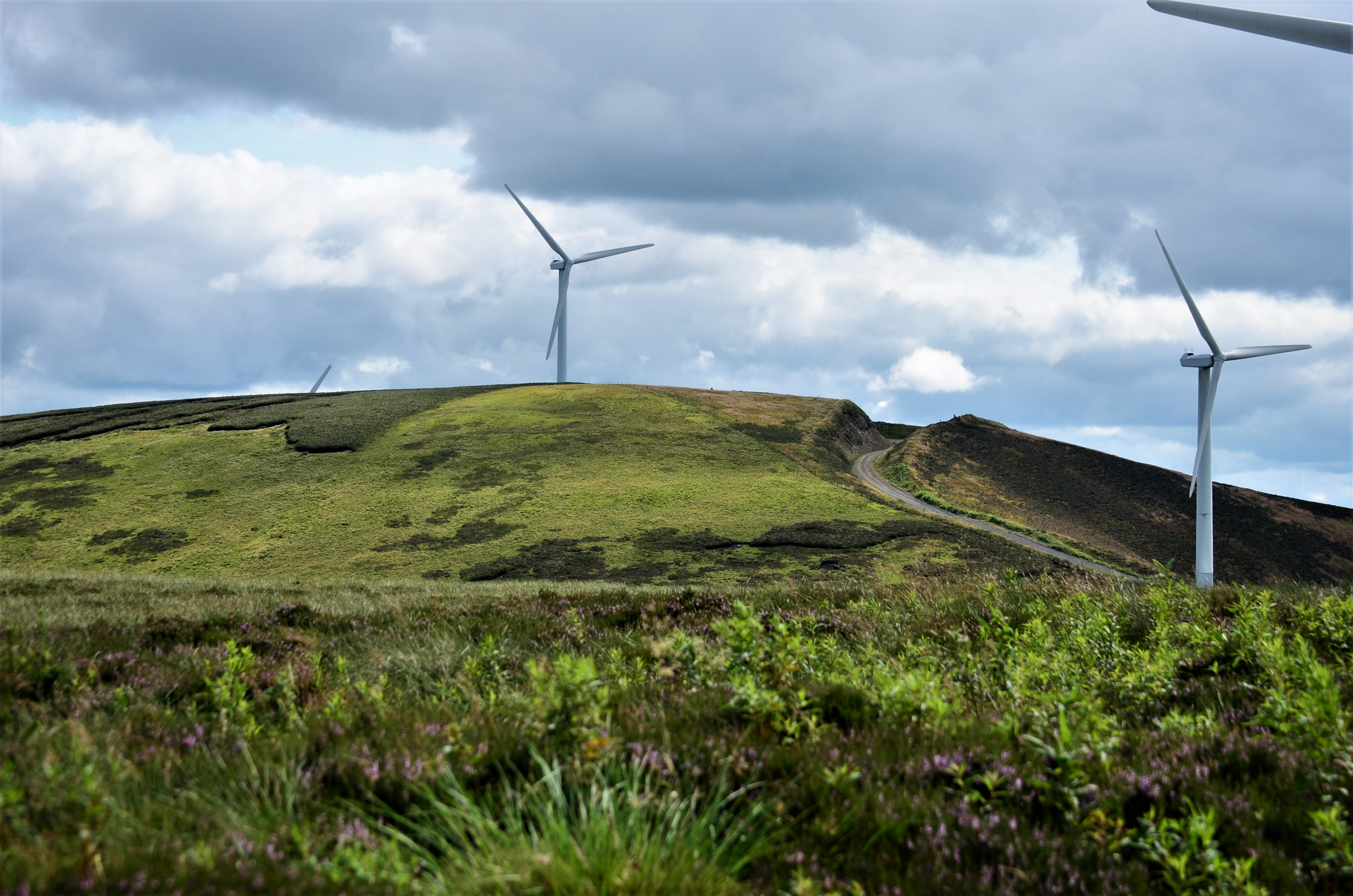

Highest point
- Elevation: 626 m (2,054 ft)
- Prominence: 79 m (259 ft)
- Listing: Tu,Sim,D,GT,DN
- Coordinates: 55°42′38″N 3°07′40″W

Geography
- Location: Scottish Borders, Midlothian, Scotland
- Parent range: Moorfoot Hills, Southern Uplands
- Topo map: OS Landranger 73

Bowbeat Hill is a hill in the Moorfoot Hills range, part of the Southern Uplands of Scotland. It lends its name to Bowbeat Onshore Wind Farm built on the hill and commissioned in 2003. The wind farm produces 31.2MW of power using 24 turbines. It is commonly ascended with its neighbouring hills from Gladhouse Reservoir to the north.
