= Gala Group (geology) =

Series of rock strata in Great Britain

- Stratigraphic range: Rhuddanian - Telychian Silurian
- Type: Group
- Underlies: bounds Orlock Bridge Fault
- Overlies: Moffat Shale Group (faulted boundary)
- Thickness: c6000m

Lithology
- Primary: turbidites

Location
- Country: Scotland, England

Type section
- Named for: Gala Water

The Gala Group is a Silurian lithostratigraphic group (a sequence of rock strata) in the Southern Uplands of Scotland and northernmost England. The name is derived from Gala Water, a tributary of the River Tweed. The rocks of the Gala Group have also previously been known as the Queensberry Grits and the Strangford Group. Graded beds variously of wackestone, siltstone and mudstone are interpreted as turbidites and have been matched with the Central Belt turbidites which are seen in the Ards Peninsula in Northern Ireland. The strata are generally near-vertical and are bounded to the north by the Orlock Bridge Fault and to the south by the Laurieston Fault. Graptolites are found in a few beds.
