= Windlestraw Law =

Hill of the Southern Uplands of Scotland

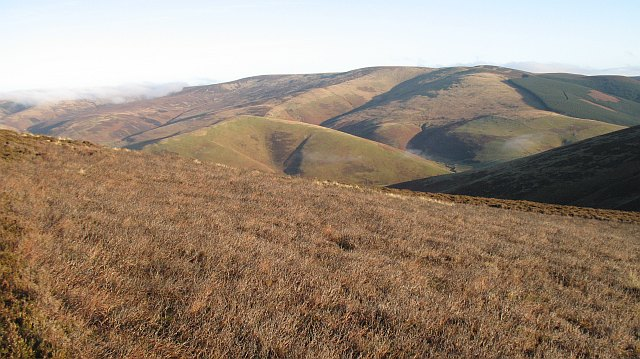

Highest point
- Elevation: 659 m (2,162 ft)
- Prominence: 461 m (1,512 ft)
- Listing: Ma,Hu,Tu,Sim,G,D,DN,Y
- Coordinates: 55°40′39″N 3°00′03″W

Geography
- Location: Scottish Borders, Scotland
- Parent range: Moorfoot Hills, Southern Uplands
- OS grid: NT 37128 43091
- Topo map: OS Landranger 73

Windlestraw Law is a hill in the Moorfoot Hills range, part of the Southern Uplands of Scotland. It is the highest peak of the range, and lies north of the town of Innerleithen in the Scottish Borders. A large and boggy peak, it is usually climbed from either its western slopes or the longer route from Tweeddale to the south.

== Subsidiary SMC Summits ==
Summit	Height (m)	Listing
Bareback Knowe Windlestraw Law SW Top	656	DT,sSim
