= Gladhouse Reservoir =

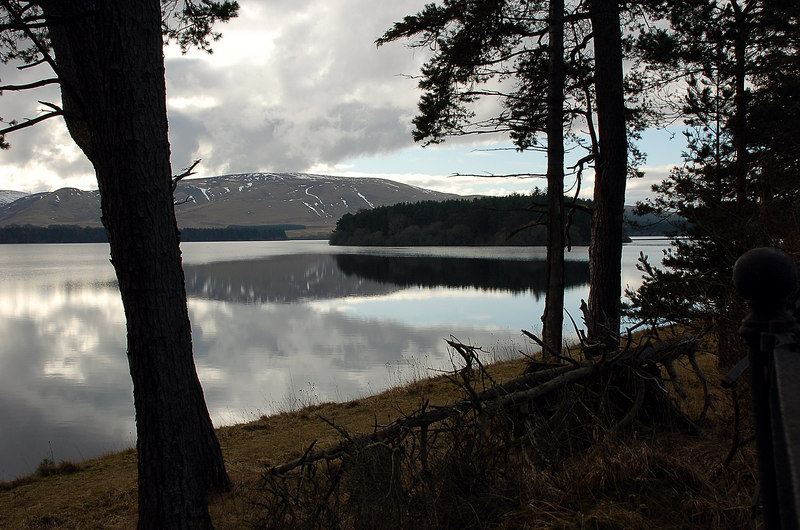

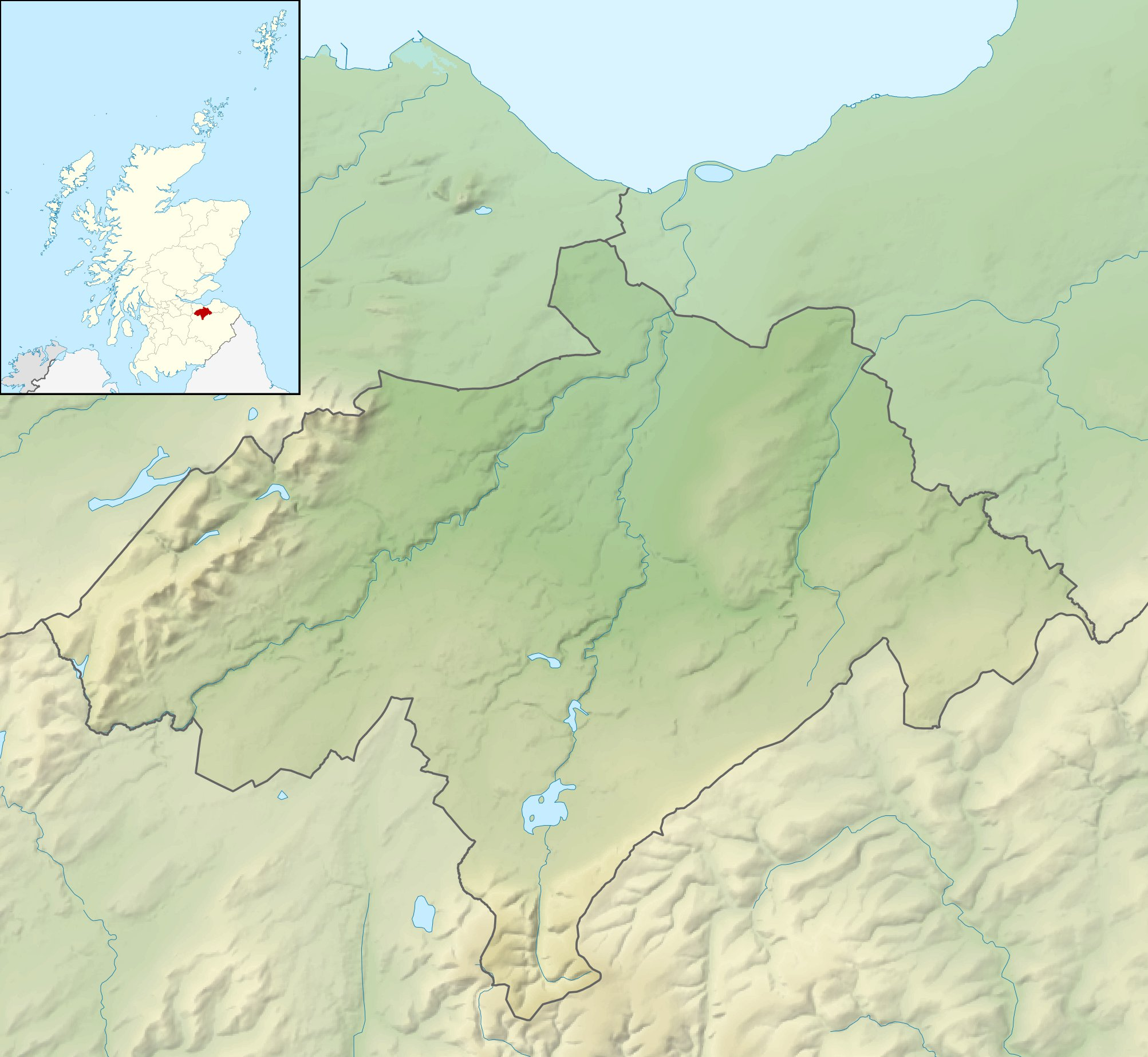
- Location within Midlothian
- Location: Midlothian
- Coordinates: 55.7695°N 3.1198°W
- Type: reservoir
- Basin countries: Scotland
- Surface area: 460 acres (190 ha)
- Islands: 3

Ramsar Wetland
- Designated: 14 July 1988
- Reference no.: 404

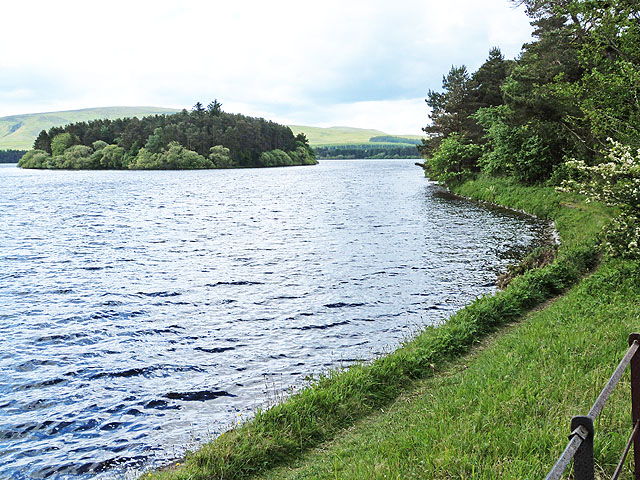
Gladhouse Reservoir

Gladhouse Reservoir, formerly known as Moorfoot Loch, is a reservoir in Midlothian, Scotland, five miles (8 km) south of Penicuik. It is the most southerly reservoir in Midlothian, as well as being the largest area of freshwater in the Lothians. It is used to supply Edinburgh with drinking water.

== History ==
It was created in 1879 by the engineer James Leslie (1801–1889) and is the oldest of the reservoirs built in the catchment of the River South Esk. It was constructed to supply Edinburgh with water, the older and smaller reservoirs in the Pentland Hills being unable to meet the city's needs.

== Description ==
Gladhouse Reservoir covers an area of 186 hectares (460 acres) meaning it is the largest freshwater area in the Lothians. It is a sizeable, rather shallow waterbody which contains two small islands, lying at an altitude of 270 metres (890 ft) above sea level at the foot of the Moorfoot Hills. The dam and its associated construction were built using pink sandstone and were designed to have a capacity of up to "1700 million gallons" of water. This engineering achievement was considered impressive at the time. By constructing the dam and creating the reservoir by damming the River South Esk, the people of Edinburgh were able to increase their available water supply by 180 liters (40 imperial gallons) per person. It is the most southerly of all the reservoirs in the Lothians.

=== Osprey Island ===
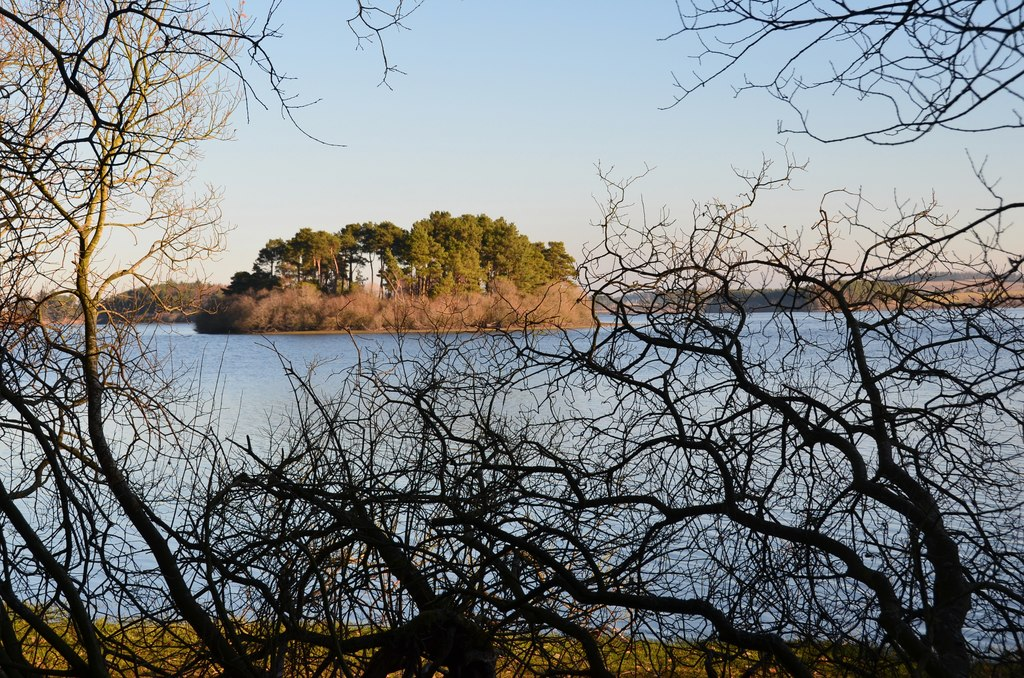
A view of Osprey Island over the water

Osprey Island is an island in the reservoir. The largest of the three main islands in the reservoir, it is around 5 acres in size and is completely forested in a thick cover of native Scots Pine and other Broadleaf trees around the edge of the land. Visitors are encouraged to be respectful if they visit the island and avoid disturbing wildlife or important Osprey nesting sites.

Since the island was formed in 1879, it has become a mostly disregarded and unexplored piece of land that is now extremely rich in wildlife due to little to no human intervention in over 100 years. Nesting ospreys have been recorded on the island, as well as other birds such as wintering pink-footed geese. The surrounding water is home to trout, and the thick vegetation on the island provides a home and food source to other wildlife. Work has been done to research and conserve Osprey Island and the surrounding area, although no big steps have been done in recent times.

== Fishing ==
Gladhouse Reservoir is stocked with brown trout and is a popular site for fishing.

== Wildlife interest ==
Gladhouse Reservoir is an important roost site for wintering populations of pink-footed goose and has a large population of greylag goose. It has been designated a Ramsar site because of its internationally important counts of pink-footed goose. Mallard, tufted duck, teal, coot, common moorhen, great crested grebe and little grebe have all bred. In winter there are populations of mallard, teal, wigeon and tufted duck. It has also been used as a breeding ground by ospreys.

== See also ==
- Edgelaw Reservoir
- Glencorse Reservoir
- List of reservoirs and dams in the United Kingdom
