= Whitehope Law =

Hill in the Southern Uplands of Scotland

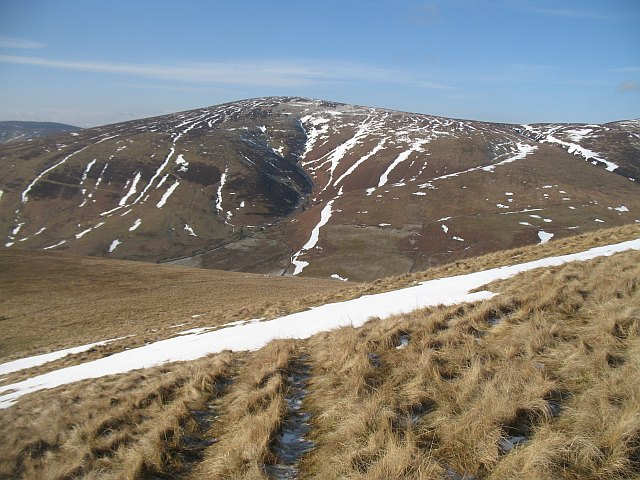

Highest point
- Elevation: 623 m (2,044 ft)
- Prominence: 66 m (217 ft)
- Listing: Tu,Sim,D,GT,DN

Geography
- Location: Scottish Borders, Scotland
- Parent range: Moorfoot Hills, Southern Uplands
- OS grid: NT 33032 44574
- Topo map: OS Landranger 73

Whitehope Law is a hill in the Moorfoot Hills range, part of the Southern Uplands of Scotland. A relatively isolated hill, it is frequently climbed on its own from the B709 road to its south and east. A farm to the south lends its name to the hill.
