= Finlathen Aqueduct =

Footbridge in Dundee, Scotland

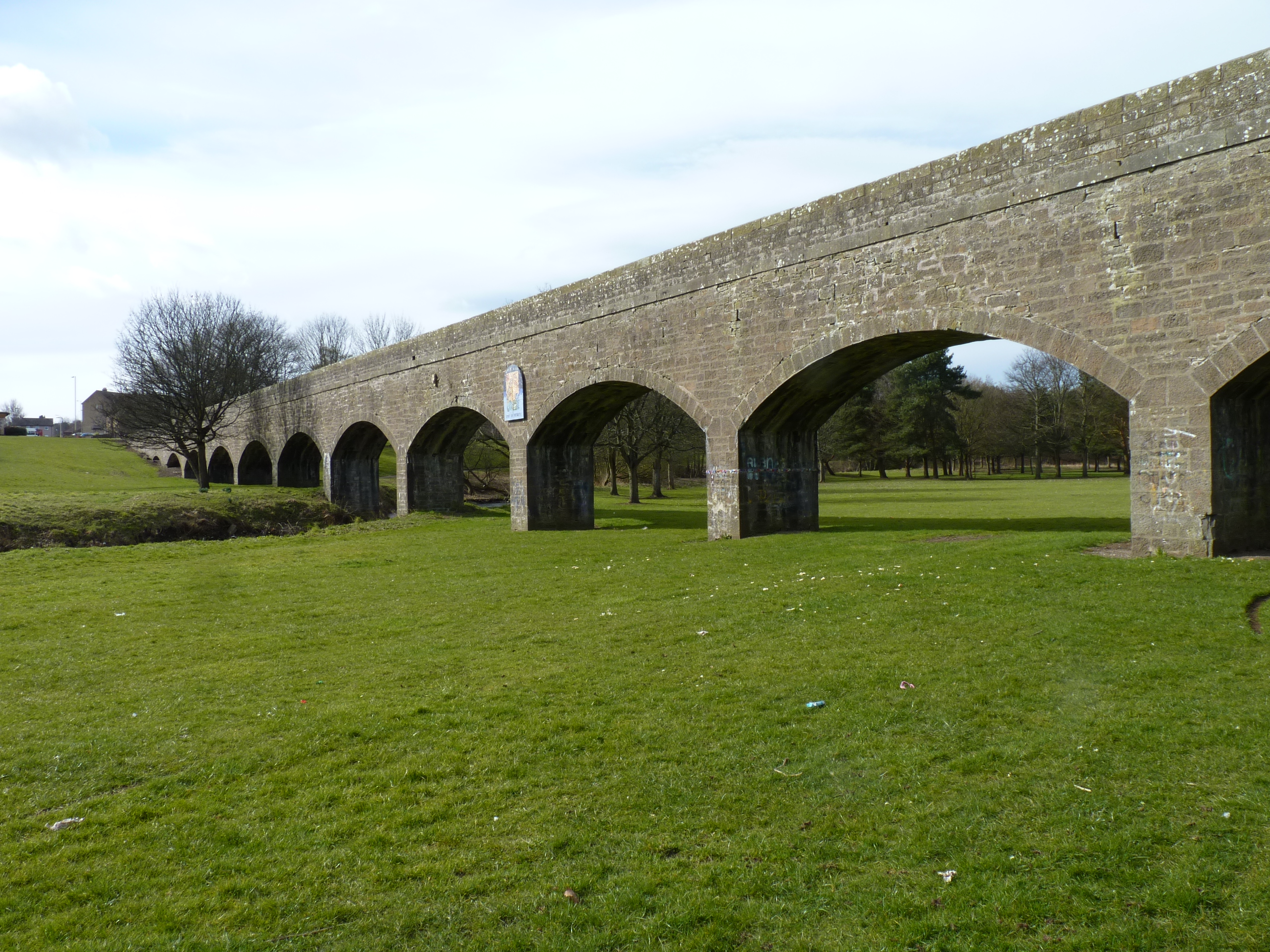
- The footbridge in Finlathen Park
- Coordinates: 56.48605°N 2.94251°W
- OS grid reference: NO 42054 33060
- Crosses: Dighty Burn
- Locale: Dundee

Characteristics
- Material: Stone
- No. of spans: 11

History
- Built: 1844

Listed Building – Category B
- Official name: Finlathen Aqueduct
- Designated: 12 March 1993
- Reference no.: LB25284

Location
- Interactive map of Finlathen Aqueduct

Finlathen Aqueduct is a former aqueduct which now serves as a footbridge in Dundee, Scotland. It is Category B listed.

== History ==
The aqueduct was constructed in the 1840s to carry water from Monikie Burn to Stobsmuir Reservoir. A second water main with a diameter of 15 inches was laid in 1862 however the expanded aqueduct proved inadequate. In the 1870s it was superseded by a new water supply from the Loch of Lintrathen. It was later opened as a footpath.

In July 2019, the aqueduct was closed and fenced off after sagging was observed. Part of the edge of the aqueduct subsequently collapsed overnight. The repaired bridge reopened in June 2022.

== Gallery ==
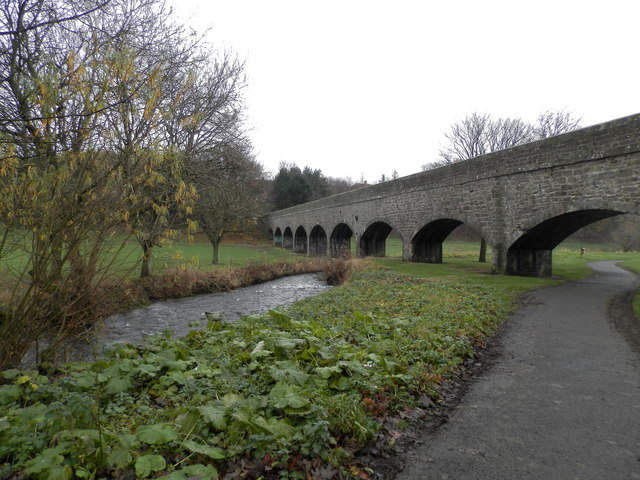

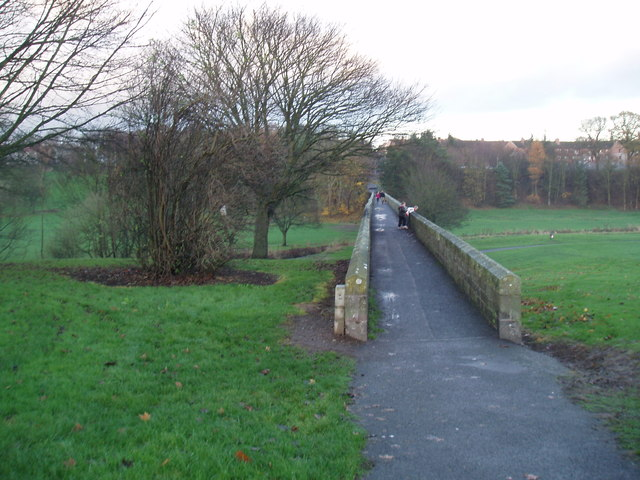

== See also ==
- List of bridges in Scotland
