= James Leslie (engineer) =

Scottish civil engineer (1801–1889)

James Leslie FRSE (25 September 1801 – 29 December 1889) was a Scottish civil engineer specialising in docks, harbours bridges and reservoirs, largely on the east coast of Scotland. He was also an amateur meteorologist.

== Life ==
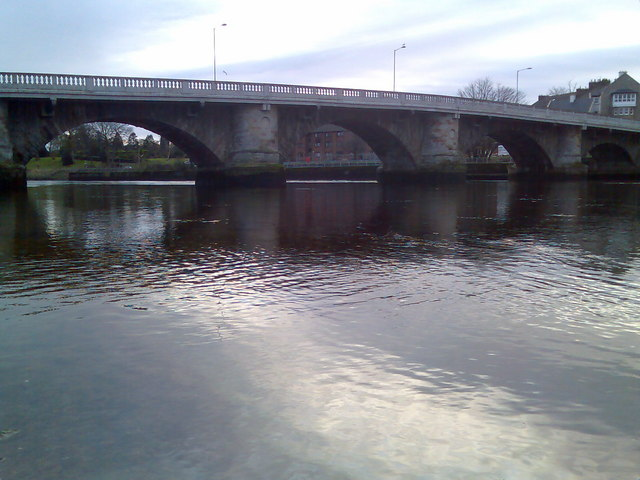
River Leven and Old Leven Bridge by John Leslie

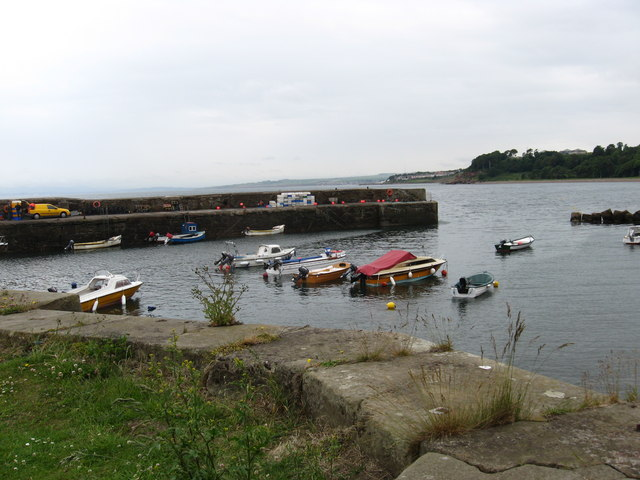
West Wemyss Harbour

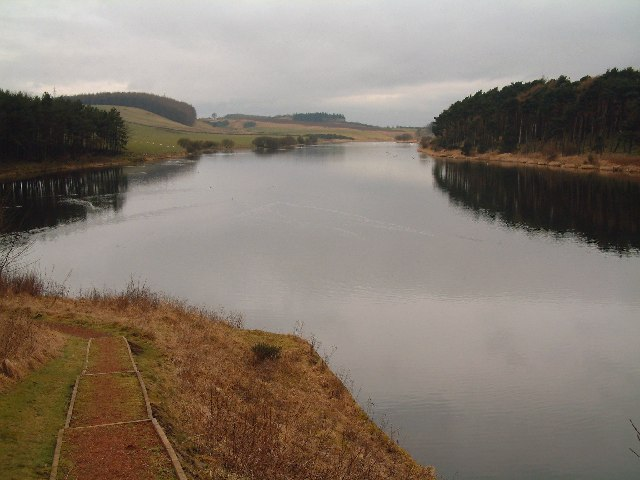
Clatto Reservoir

Spillway, Edgelaw Reservoir

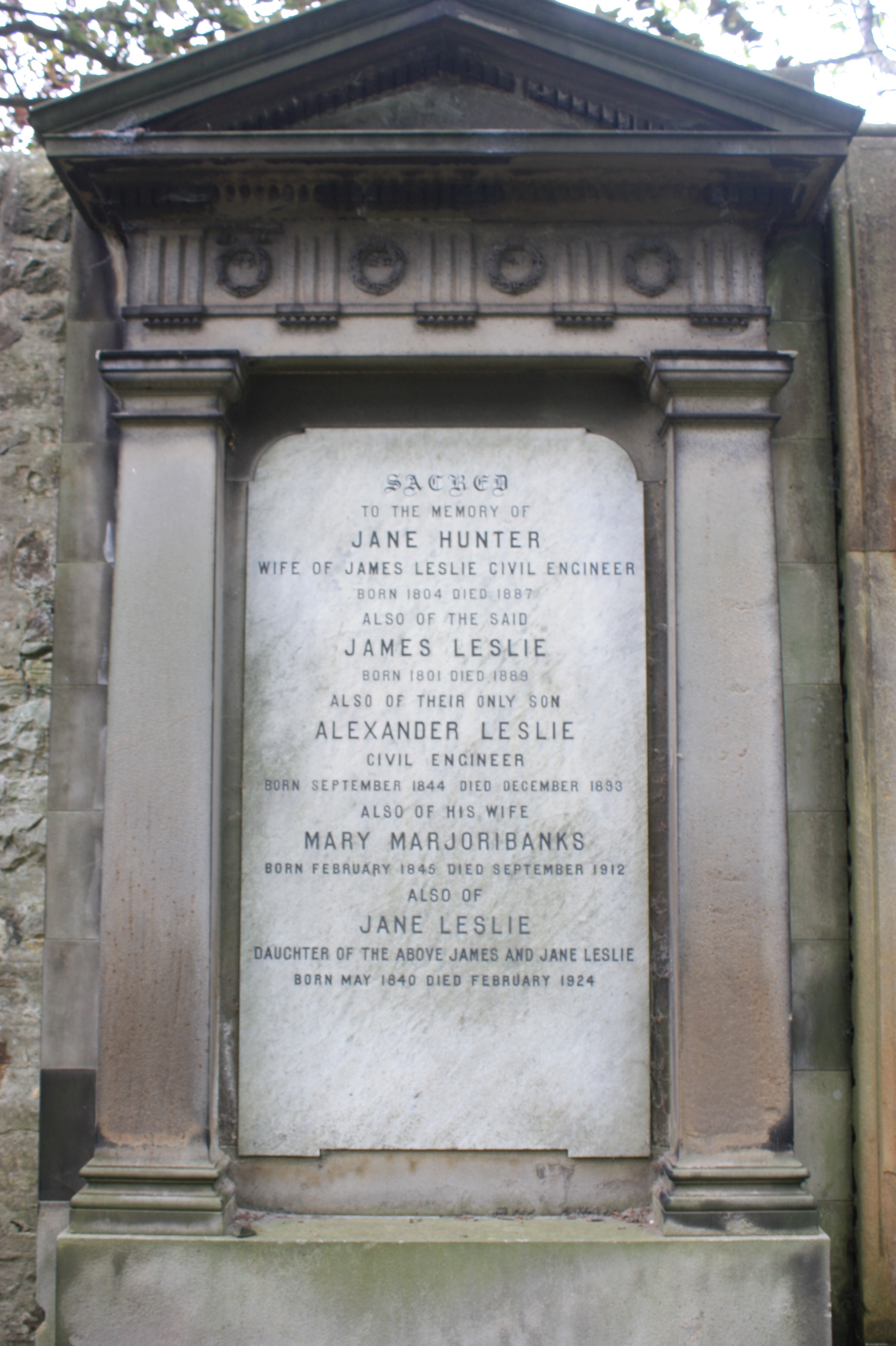
The grave of James Leslie, Dean Cemetery, Edinburgh

He was born in Largo, Fife on 25 September 1801 the son of Archibald Leslie, an architect-builder, and attended school both in Largo and nearby in Newburn. He was then sent to Benjamin Mackay's Latin Academy in Edinburgh and from there to the University of Edinburgh to study maths and physics under his uncle, Professor John Leslie. In 1818 he was articled to William Henry Playfair as an architect, but in 1824 he left this position to pursue engineering. He obtained a place with James Rennie working in the London Docks and on the London Bridge project.

In 1828 he returned to Edinburgh to take a job as Resident Engineer in Leith Docks. In 1830 he lived at 19 Constitution Street in Leith, located close to the main east entrance to the docks (fragments of the house remain). In 1832 he moved to be Resident Engineer of Dundee Harbour. He was assisted in Dundee by Charles Ower.

In 1846 he returned to Edinburgh to begin work on several reservoir projects for the Edinburgh Water Company. In 1869 he returned to Dundee to involve in several projects to improve its water supply.

In 1858 he was elected a Fellow of the Royal Society of Edinburgh his proposer being David Stevenson.

From 1871 his son Alexander joined his firm and it was thereafter known as J & A Leslie. From 1875 almost all work was done by Alexander.

He broke his leg in a carriage accident around 1880 and never fully recovered. He was confined to bed for the last 6 months of his life. In partnership with his son and son-in-law (see below) he ran Leslie & Reid from offices at 2 Charlotte Square.

He died at home, 11 Portland Place in Leith on 29 December 1889. He is buried in Dean Cemetery in western Edinburgh. The grave lies on the outer wall near the beginning of the south-west spur.

== Family ==
He was married to Jane Hunter (1804–1887). Their son Alexander Leslie FRSE (1844–1893), also a civil engineer, formed a partnership with his brother-in-law (James’ son-in-law) Robert Carstairs Reid to create Leslie & Reid.

His grandson James Leslie (1881–1921) was also a civil engineer.

== Main works ==
See

- Western breakwater, Leith Docks (1830)
- Wet dock, Dysart (1830)
- Earl Grey Dock, Dundee (1832) as supervisor
- Tide Harbour at Camperdown Dock, Dundee (1833)
- Victoria Dock and Swing Bridge, Dundee (1833)
- The Telford Light, Dundee (1834)
- Patent Slipway, Dundee (1837)
- Harbour Workshops, Dundee (1837)
- Rebuilding of Methil Harbour and Docks (1838)
- Wet Dock and Harbour, Arbroath (1839)
- Dundee Custom House (1839) with John Taylor as architect
- Locks on the Monkland Canal (1830)
- Bridge at Leven, Fife (1839)
- Bridge at Aldbar Castle (1843)
- Raising James Jardine’s Glencorse Reservoir (1845)
- Finlathen Aqueduct (1845)
- Extension to pier at Burntisland (1846)
- Improvements to the Old East Dock, Leith (1846)
- Aqueduct at Burnhouse of Duntrune, Angus (1848)
- Aqueduct at Gagie, Angus (1848)
- Aqueduct at Murroes (1848)
- Dock buildings and Custom House, Montrose (1853)
- Sea Wall north of St Andrews Cathedral (1856)
- East Pier at Stranraer Harbour (1861)
- Harbour at West Wemyss (1872)
- Lawton reservoir, Dundee (1873)
- Clatto Reservoir, Dundee (1874)
- Alnwickhill Reservoir (1875) plus second phase in 1888
- Water Tower in Dalkeith (1879)
- Gladhouse Reservoir (1879)
- Edgelaw Reservoir (1880)
- Rosebery Reservoir (1880)
- Williamwath Bridge, Dumfriesshire (1882)
