= Orlock Bridge Fault =

Major geological fault in Northern Ireland and Scotland

Coordinates: 54.63686°N 5.67759°W

Orlock Bridge Fault is a major geological fault which extends through County Armagh, Northern Ireland and across the North Channel into Galloway in southern Scotland.

== See also ==
- List of geological faults in Northern Ireland
