= Raised-relief map =

Three-dimensional object representing a real terrain

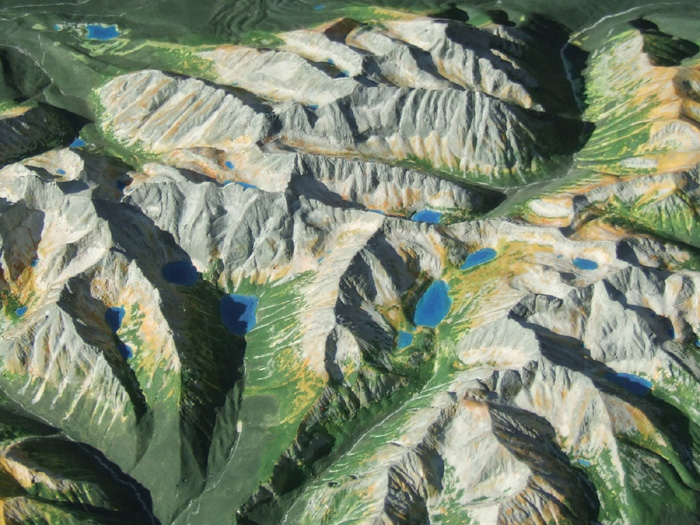
Handmade raised-relief map of the High Tatras in scale 1:50 000

A raised-relief map, terrain model or embossed map is a three-dimensional representation, usually of terrain, materialized as a physical artifact. When representing terrain, the vertical dimension is usually exaggerated by a factor between five and ten; this facilitates the visual recognition of terrain features.

== History ==
If the account of Sima Qian (c. 145–86 BCE) in his Records of the Grand Historian is proven correct upon the unearthing of Qin Shi Huang's tomb, the raised-relief map has existed since the Qin dynasty (221–206 BCE) of China. Joseph Needham suggests that certain pottery vessels of the Han dynasty (202 BCE – 220 CE) showing artificial mountains as lid decorations may have influenced the raised-relief map.

The Han dynasty general Ma Yuan made a raised-relief map of valleys and mountains in a rice-constructed model of 32 CE. Such rice models were expounded on by the Tang dynasty (618–907) author Jiang Fang in his Essay on the Art of Constructing Mountains with Rice (c. 845). A raised-relief map made of wood representing all the provinces of the empire and put together like a giant 0.93 m^{2} (10 ft^{2}) jigsaw puzzle was invented by Xie Zhuang (421–466) during the Liu Song dynasty (420–479).

Shen Kuo (1031-1095) created a raised-relief map using sawdust, wood, beeswax, and wheat paste. His wooden model pleased Emperor Shenzong of Song, who later ordered that all the prefects administering the frontier regions should prepare similar wooden maps which could be sent to the capital and stored in an archive.

In 1130, Huang Shang made a wooden raised-relief map which later caught the attention of the Neo-Confucian philosopher Zhu Xi, who tried to acquire it but instead made his own map out of sticky clay and wood. The map, made of eight pieces of wood connected by hinges, could be folded up and carried around by one person.

Later, Ibn Battuta (1304–1377) described a raised-relief map while visiting Gibraltar.

In his 1665 paper for the Philosophical Transactions of the Royal Society, John Evelyn (1620–1706) believed that wax models imitating nature and bas relief maps were something entirely new from France. Some later scholars attributed the first raised-relief map to one Paul Dox, who represented the area of Kufstein in his raised-relief map of 1510.

== Construction ==
There are a number of ways to create a raised-relief map. Each method has advantages and disadvantages in regards to accuracy, price, and relative ease of creation.

=== Layer Stacking ===
Starting with a topographic map, one can cut out successive layers from some sheet material, with edges following the contour lines on the map. These may be assembled in a stack to obtain a rough approximation of the terrain. This method is commonly used as the base for architectural models, and is usually done without vertical exaggeration. For models of landforms, the stack can then be smoothed by filling with some material. This model may be used directly, or for greater durability a mold may be made from it. This mold may then be used to produce a plaster model.

=== Vacuum Formed Plastic Maps ===
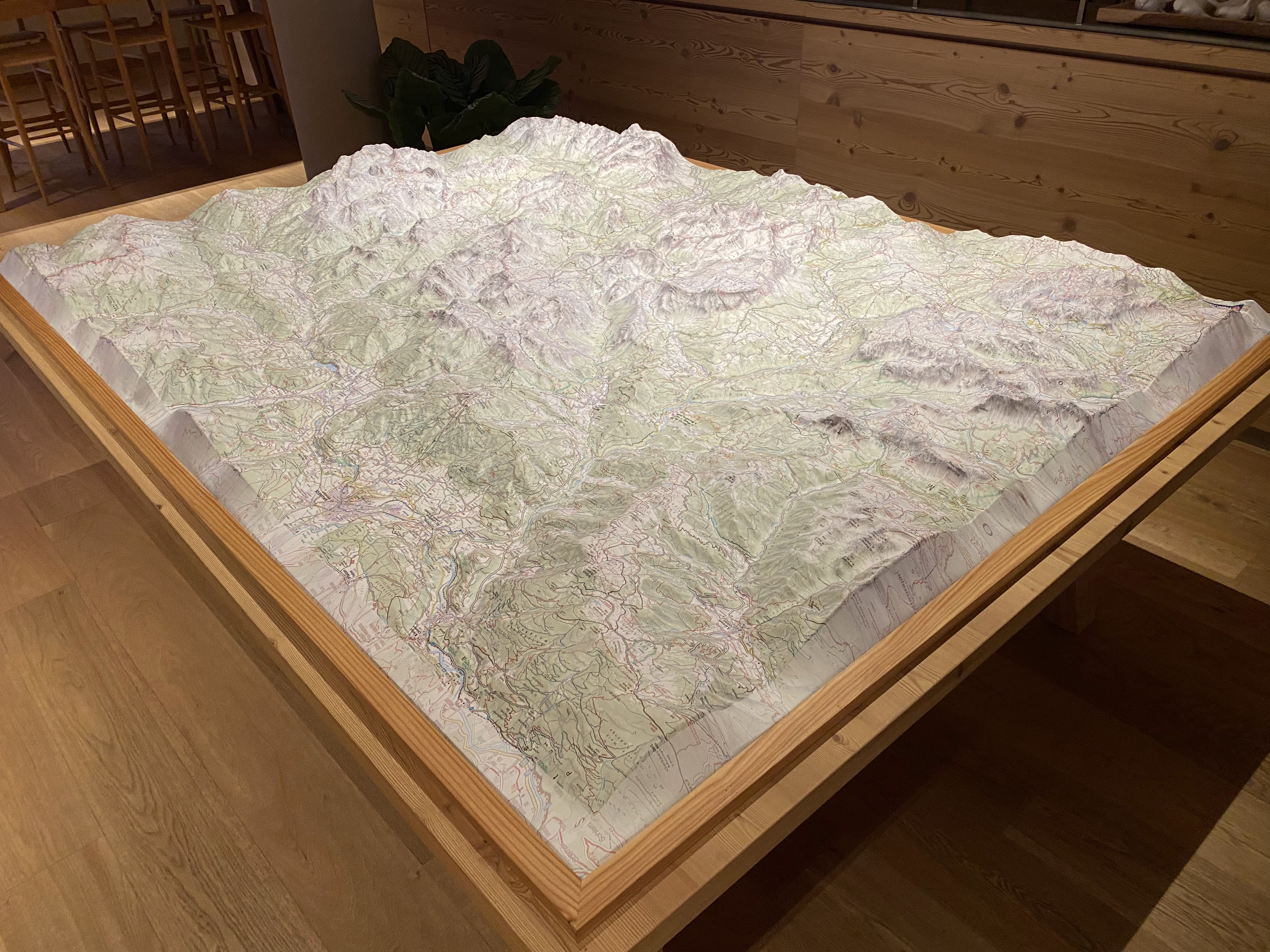
A vacuum formed plastic map

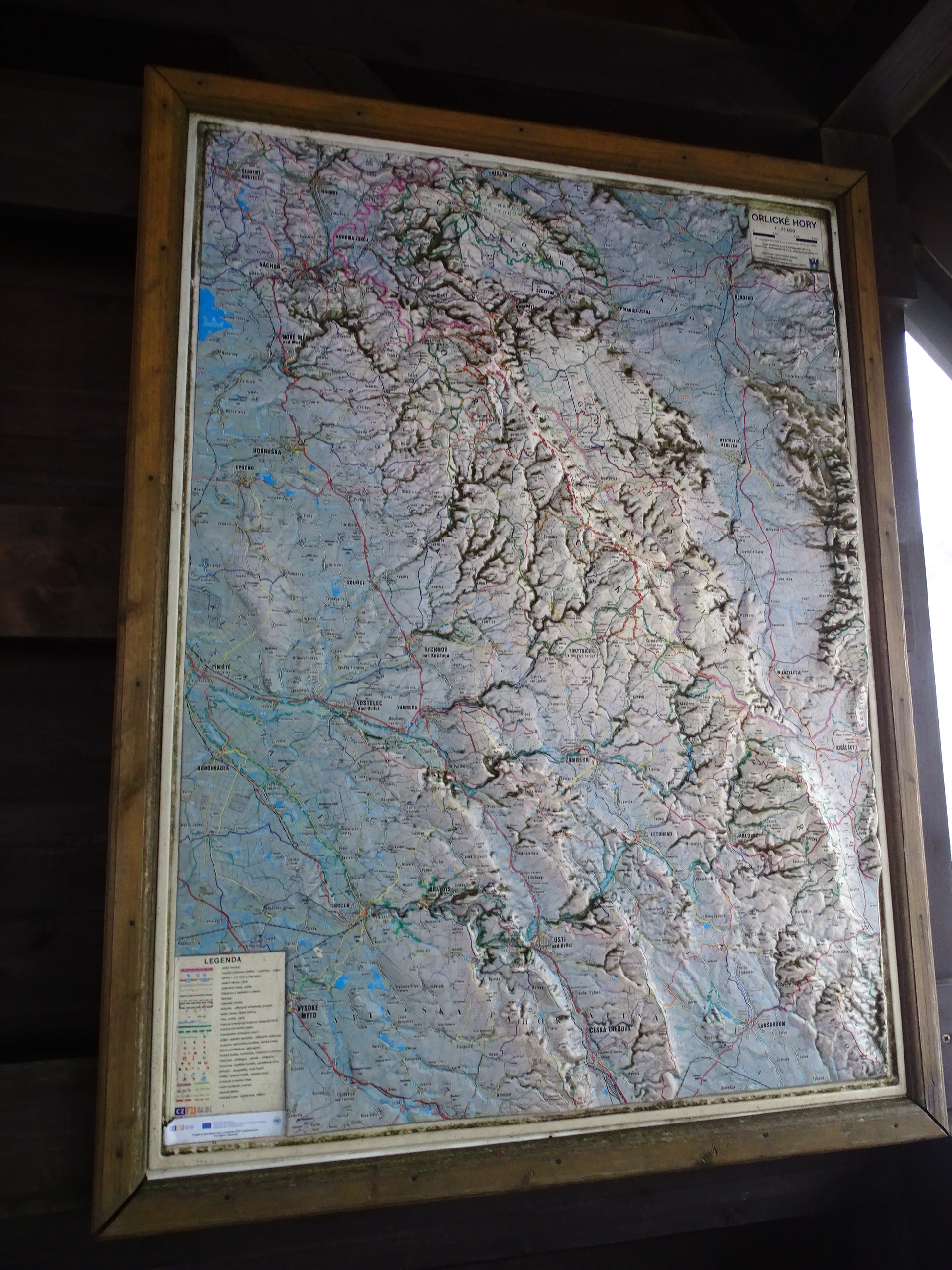
A vacuum formed plastic map

A combination of computer numerical control (CNC) machining a master model, and vacuum forming copies from this, can be been used to rapidly mass-produce raised-relief maps. The Vacuum Forming technique, invented in 1947 by the Army Map Service in Washington, D.C., uses vacuum-formed plastic sheets and heat to increase the production rate of these maps. To make the Vacuum-Formed plastic maps, first a master model made of resin or other materials is created with a computer guided milling machine using a digital terrain model. Then a reproduction mold is cast using the master mold and a heat and pressure resistant material. Fine holes are put into the reproduction mold so that the air can later be removed by a vacuum. Next, a plastic sheet is applied to the mold so that they are airtight, and a heater is placed above the plastic for about 10 seconds. The vacuum is then applied to remove the remaining air. After letting the plastic cool, it can be removed and the terrain is complete. After this step, a color map can be overlaid/printed onto the bases that were created to make it realistic.

Vacuum-formed plastic maps have many advantages and disadvantages. They can be quickly produced, which can be beneficial in time of war or disaster. However, the accuracy of certain points throughout the model can vary. The points that touch the mold first are the most accurate, while the points that touch the mold last can become bulged and slightly distorted. Also, the effectiveness of this particular construction method varies by the terrain being represented. They are not good at representing sharp-edged land forms like high mountain ranges or urban areas.

=== 3D Printing ===
3D printed terrain model of Mount Saint Helens.

STL of Mount St. Helens sliced in Cura

STL model of Mars with 20× elevation exaggeration for 3D printing

Another method which is becoming more widespread is the use of 3D printing. With the rapid development of this technology, its use is becoming increasingly economical. In order to create a raised-relief map using a 3D printer, Digital Elevation Models (DEM) are rendered into a 3D computer model, which can then be sent to a 3D printer. Most consumer-level 3D printers extrude plastic layer by layer to create a 3D object. However, if a map is needed for commercial and professional uses, higher-end printers can be used. These 3D printers use a combination of powders, resins, and even metals to create higher-quality models. After the model is created, color can be added to show different land cover characteristics, providing a more realistic view of the area. Some benefits of using a 3D printed model include the technology and DEMs being more prevalent easier to find, and that they are easier to understand than a typical topographic map.

=== DEM/TIN Formed Papercraft Maps ===
Creating a papercraft raised relief map via a Digital Elevation Model (DEM) is a low cost alternative to many other methods. The method involves converting the DEM to a triangulated irregular network (TIN), unfolding the TIN, printing the unfolded TIN on paper, and assembling the printout into a physical 3D model. This method allows raised relief maps to be constructed without the need for specialized equipment or extensive training. The degree of realism and accuracy of the resulting maps is similar to that of layer stacking models. However, the quality of the final map heavily depends on the characteristics of the TIN used.

== Non-terrain applications ==
For appropriate mathematical functions and especially for certain types of statistics displays, a similar model may be constructed as an aid to understanding a function or as an aid to studying the statistical data.

== Notable examples ==
The Great Polish Map of Scotland is claimed to be the largest terrain relief model, constructed out of brick and concrete in the grounds of a hotel near Peebles, Scotland. It measures 50 by 40 metres (160 ft × 130 ft).

The Relief map of Guatemala, in Guatemala City, is of similar size as the Great Polish Map of Scotland. It was built in 1904–05.

However, a site in Ningxia province, China at 38°15′57″N 105°57′4″E was spotted in 2006 using satellite imagery. It measured 900 by 700 metres (3,000 ft × 2,300 ft), had a 3-kilometre (1.9 mi) perimeter and appeared to be a large scale relief model (1:500) of Aksai Chin, a disputed territory between China and India.

== See also ==
- Digital elevation model
- Digital terrain model
- Hypsometric tints
- List of Chinese inventions#R
- Musée des Plans-Reliefs
- Participatory 3D modelling (P3DM)
- Triangulated irregular network
- Karl Wenschow (German Wikipedia)
