= Great Polish Map of Scotland =

Sculpture near Eddleston, Scotland

Coordinates: 55°42′43″N 3°13′00″W

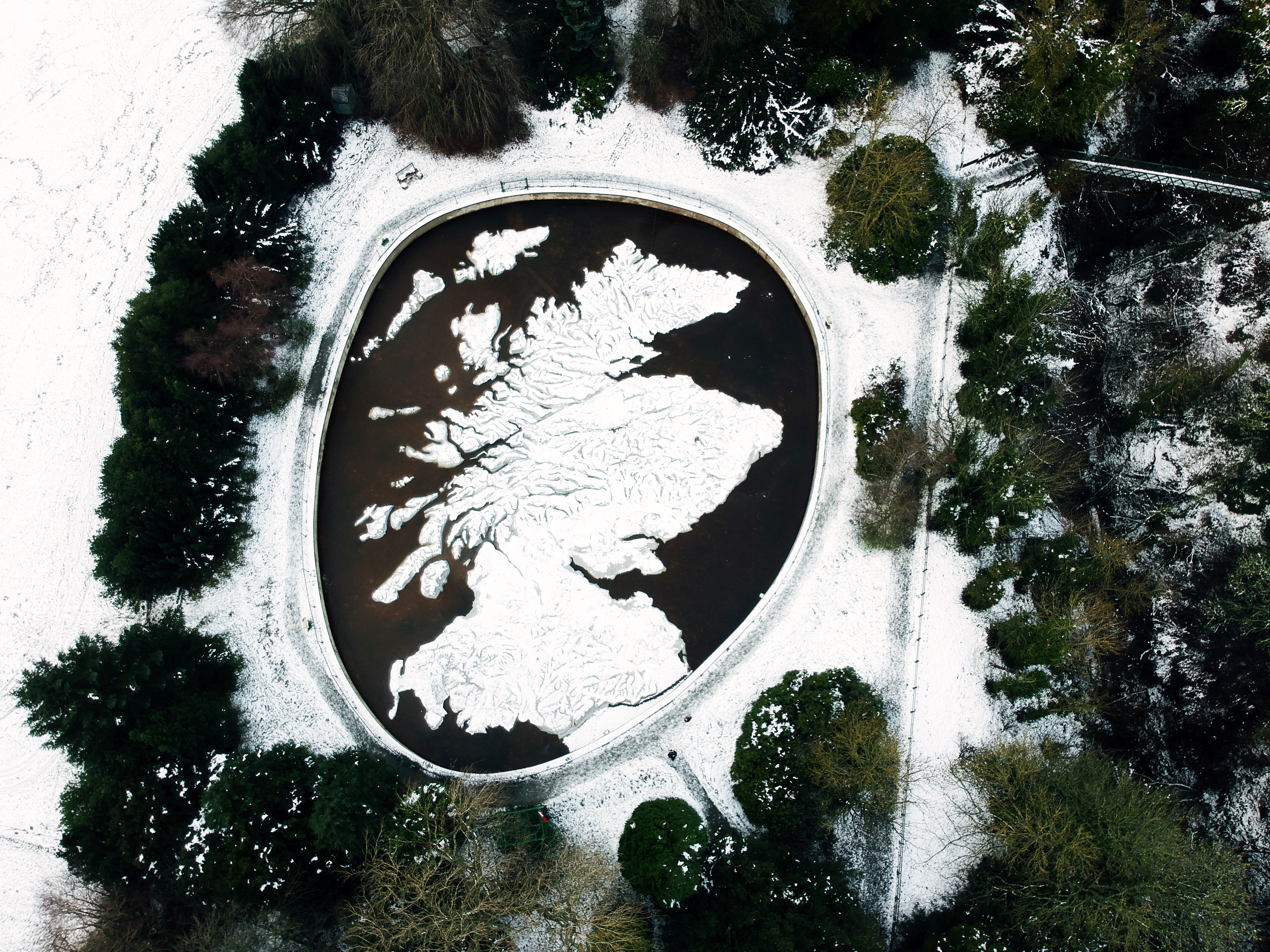
Aerial view of the snow-covered model. The map depicts most of Scotland, with the omission of the Northern Isles.

The Great Polish Map of Scotland is a large (50 m x 40 m) three-dimensional, outdoor concrete scale model of Scotland, located in the grounds of the Barony Castle Hotel, outside the village of Eddleston near Peebles in the Scottish Borders. It is also known as the Mapa Scotland (derived from Polish mapa Szkocji) or the Barony Map. The brainchild of Polish war veteran Jan Tomasik, it was built between 1974 and 1979 and is claimed to be the world's largest terrain relief model. The sculpture is a category B listed building, and has been restored by the Mapa Scotland volunteer group.

== Background ==
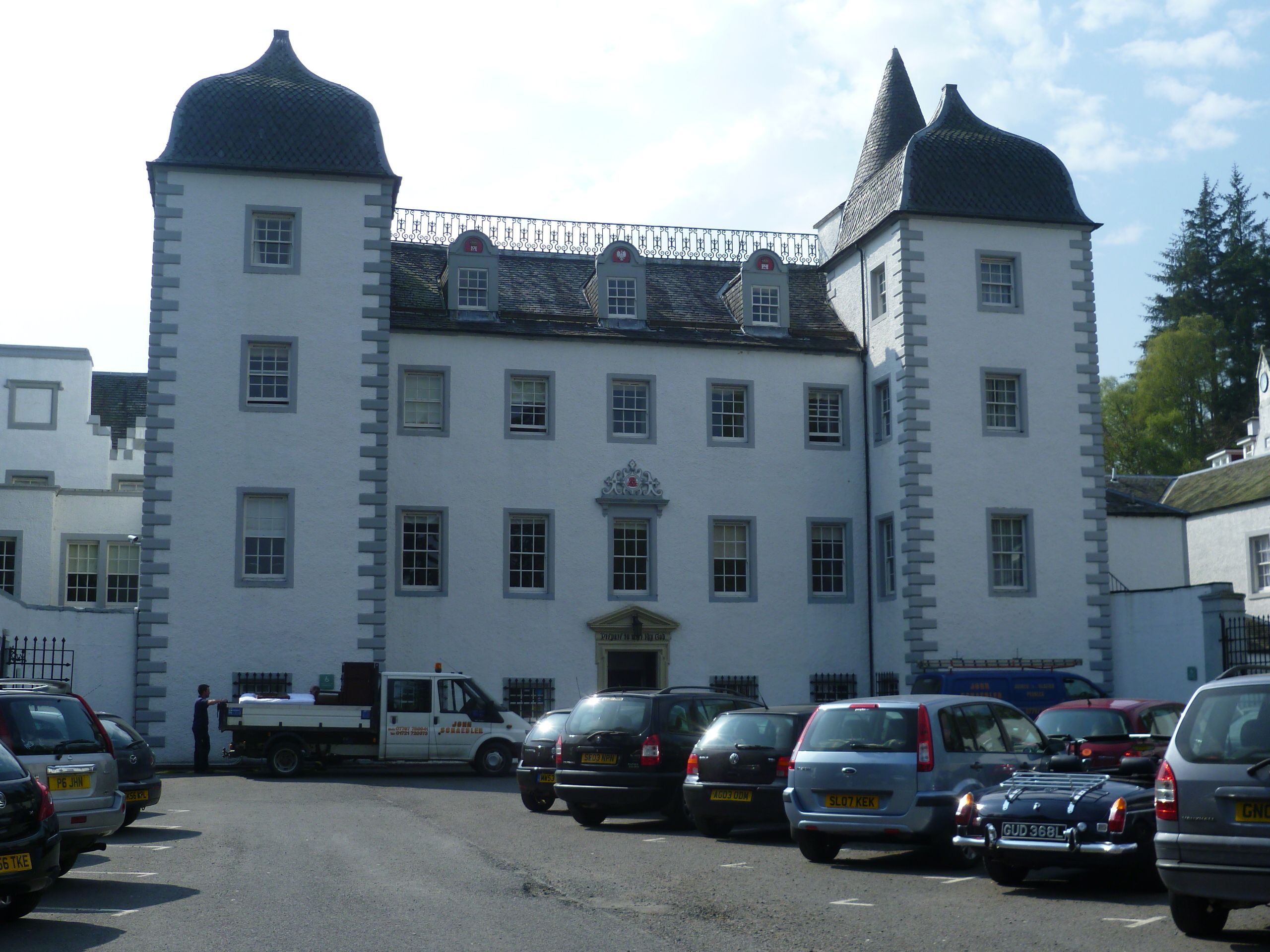
Barony Castle Hotel in 2011

Black Barony's connection with Polish Forces during the Second World War dates from early 1942, when the hotel, established in 1926, was requisitioned for use as the main Staff College for training Polish officers in Scotland.

After the Fall of France in May 1940, the Polish Army in Scotland was reorganised as the 1st Polish Corps and entrusted by the War Office with the defence of a long stretch of the country's east coast between Arbroath (later extended to Montrose, 38 miles (61 km) north of Dundee) and Burntisland on the Firth of Forth against a possible invasion from German-occupied Norway. The Poles strengthened existing defences by installing anti-tank obstacles, building pill boxes and patrolling the coastline in armoured trains. In early 1942 they gave up responsibility for Angus, taking over instead the defences of East Lothian.

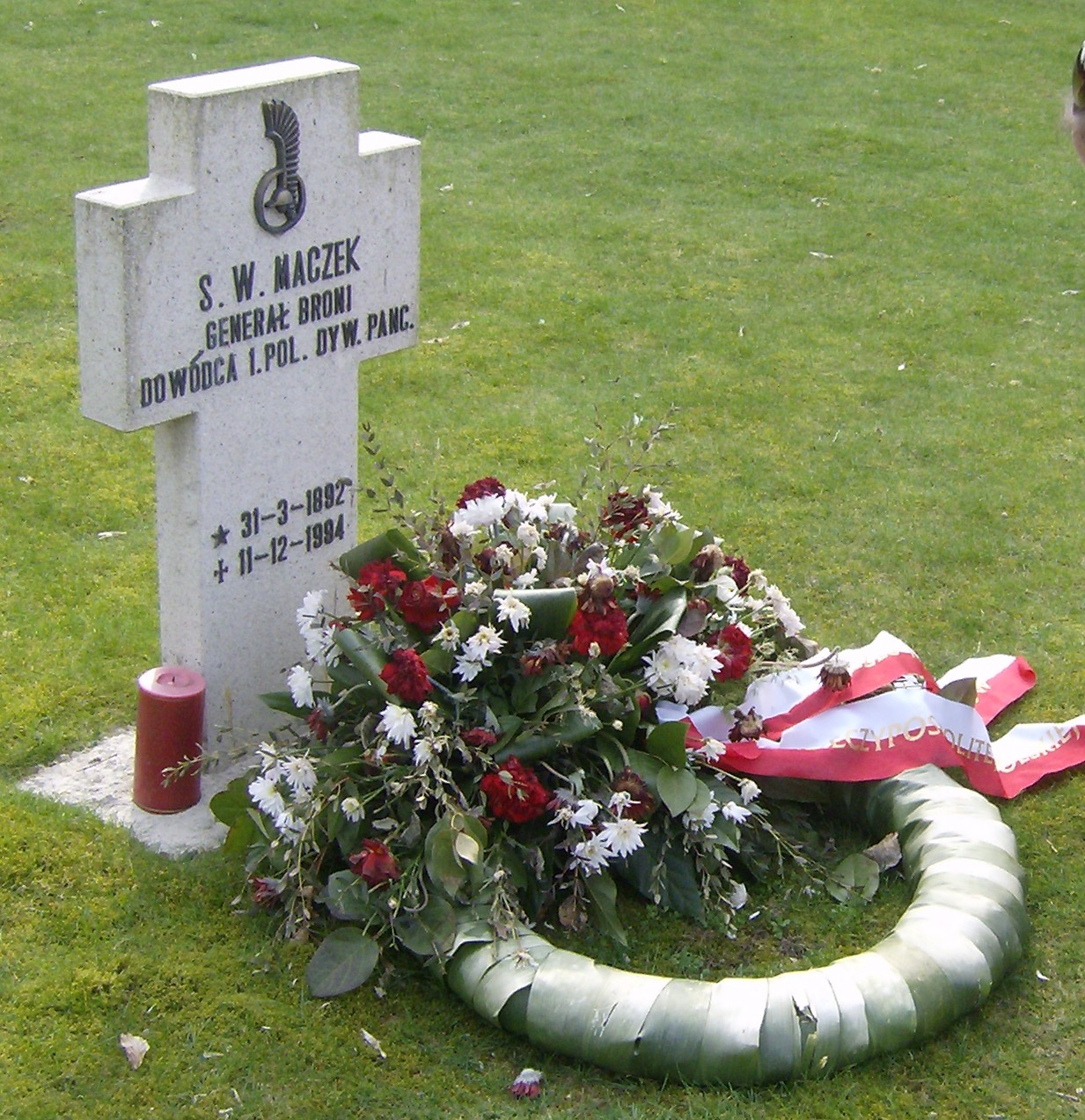
General Maczek's grave in Breda, one of the towns his forces liberated in 1944

Following the formation of the 1st Polish Armoured Division in February 1942, Polish troops under the command of General Stanisław Maczek trained in Perthshire, East Lothian, Berwickshire, and East Anglia before taking part in the Normandy landings of 1944. In the Normandy campaign they played a conspicuous part in the Battle of the Falaise Gap, and in the liberation of the Netherlands and defeat of the Third Reich. After the war and the Communist takeover in Poland, many of the Polish soldiers in the West, including General Maczek, were unwilling to return to Poland, where their personal freedom was far from assured. Many settled in Britain, particularly in Scotland.

The large concrete map of Scotland (with the omission of the remote Northern Isles) was the idea of Jan Tomasik, a sergeant in the 1st Armoured Division, who during the war had been stationed in Galashiels, about 14 miles (22 km) from the castle. He bought the hotel at Black Barony in 1968. In the early 1960s, finding his old wartime commander, like all Polish veterans, denied a war pension as a non-UK citizen, Tomasik employed Maczek in various jobs, including barman, in his Edinburgh hotel. A friendship developed between the two men, and in the 1970s Tomasik provided a room for Maczek to enjoy summer breaks with his family in his newly refurbished hotel at Barony Castle. This has led to speculation that Maczek, with his tank commander's interest in topography, may have had some input into the map, though that has never been established on the basis of evidence.

The precise reasons why Tomasik created the map are unclear. It is known that Polish soldiers created an outline map of Poland on the ground at Douglas in Lanarkshire in 1940, in the very camp where Tomasik was stationed after arriving in Britain. It is also known that he was fascinated by a large scale-model map of Belgium, which he saw at the Brussels World's Fair of 1958 on his way to visit relations in Poland. This map appears to have been the direct inspiration for the map at Barony Castle, though it is also possible that the wartime model may have been an influence. Tomasik seems to have regarded the Barony map primarily as an added attraction for his hotel guests, expecting it also to draw sightseers. However, he is also on record as having said to hotel patrons that he wanted to show the country the Poles had defended during the war and was planning to invite George VI's consort Queen Elizabeth to open the map officially. He told them that the map was to be his legacy, describing it as "a gift to the Scottish people" for the hospitality the Scots had shown the Poles during the war years. Tomasik died in 1991.

== Construction ==
The map was designed by Dr. Kazimierz Trafas, a young cartographer from the Jagiellonian University of Kraków. Despite the tensions of the Cold War, links between Scotland and Polish universities had been good since the late 1960s, when threshold analysis techniques in town and regional planning devised in Poland were refined and applied in Scotland for the Scottish Development Department.

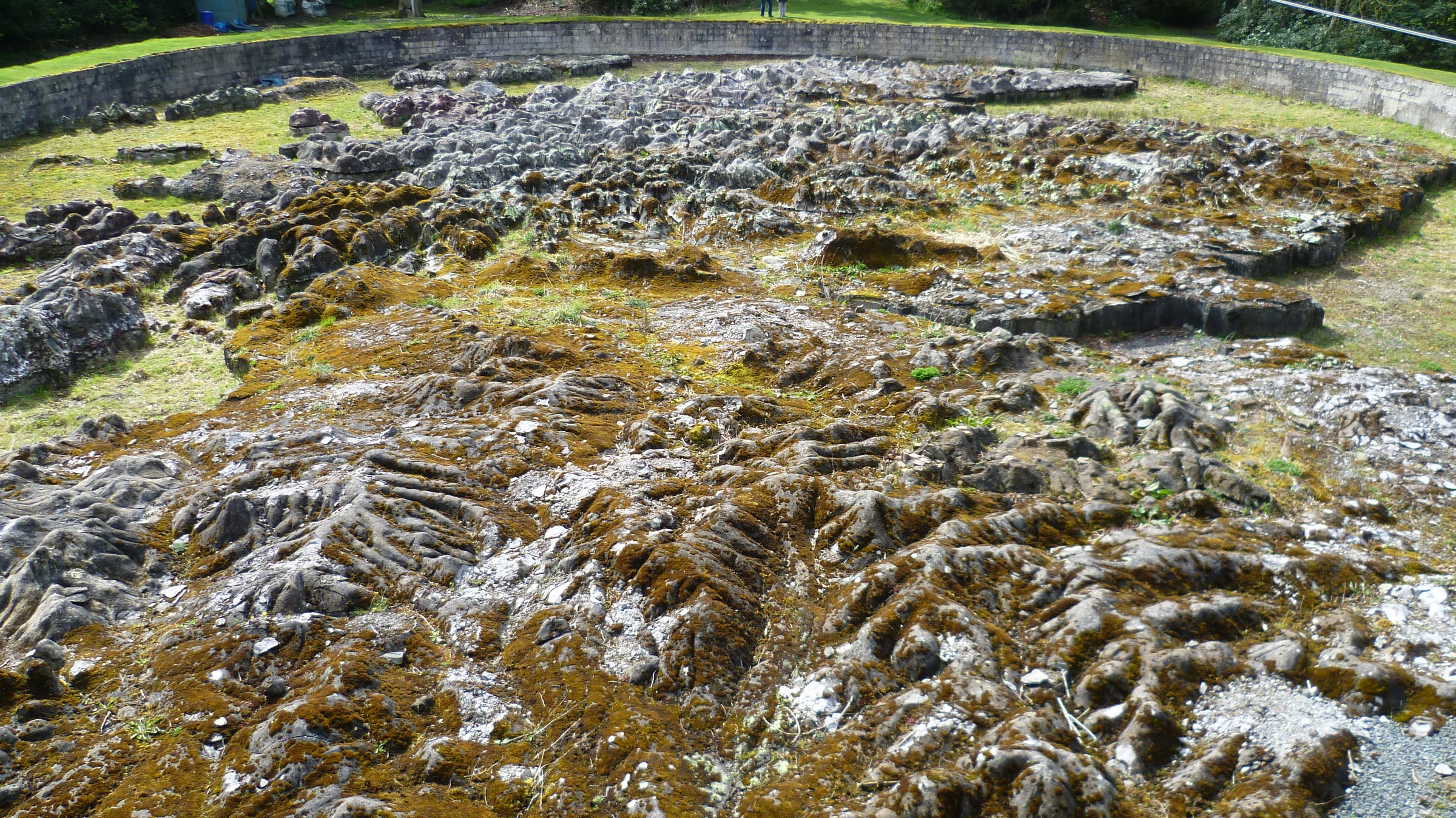
The map facing northwards from England, pictured in its pre-conserved state.

On a visit to Poland, Tomasik discussed his idea of the map with Professor Klimaszewski, head of the Jagiellonian University's Institute of Geography, vice-rector of the university and member of the Polish Council of State. Klimaszweski entrusted the task to Dr. Trafas who took charge of the project.

The Great Polish Map of Scotland, as it has been christened by the group planning to restore it, took six consecutive summers between 1974 and 1979 to construct, although the bulk of the work was accomplished by the late summer of 1976. In 1974, Trafas arrived in Scotland with his departmental colleague Roman Wolnik, surveyed the site and marked out the outline of the map to a scale of 1:10,000. The shapes of the mainland and islands were made with vertical shuttering and 300m, 600m and 900m contours laid in four-brick courses. Locations were correlated with a set of Bartholomew's survey maps of Scotland by means of a reference grid.

In the following summer, Tomasik revisited Poland, returning with Trafas, Wolnik and three Kraków University employees hired under contract to provide the manual labour to construct the concrete map. The hotel manager Marek Raton, a son-in-law of Tomasik, and hotel maintenance man Bill Robson also worked on the project, especially the excavation of the surrounding pit. Some of the labour was supplied by hiring Polish exchange students visiting Britain. The body of the map was gradually built up by infilling the prepared outlines with cement. Mountain summits were marked by vertical rods, their heights exaggerated five times relative to the horizontal scale to increase the visual effect. This was a standard traditionally adopted for British military terrain maps. The topography was then finished off by manually sculpting the landforms according to the contours shown on the Bartholomew maps.

After the last visit of the Polish cartographers in 1977, hotel employees and members of the Tomasik family continued to work on the map intermittently over two more summers before it was completed in 1979. The surface was painted with forests, urban areas, major roads and lochs shown. A wall was built around the map to create an oval-shaped basin, 1.5m deep. This was then supplied with water diverted from a nearby stream to create the seas and lochs. The gravity-fed water also flowed through submerged pipes to the major river sources. The original plan to construct a metal walkway over the model to serve as a viewing platform never materialised.

Professor Trafas, the chief designer and builder of the map, died in 2004.

== Restoration ==
After the sale of the hotel in 1985, parts of the map deteriorated slowly over the years due to vegetation growth, root and frost damage and water supply blockage. The apparently abandoned and forgotten map had all but disappeared under subsequent hotel ownership. The map was superficially restored in the 1990's as part of a promotion campaign for Scottish local government re-organisation. Further decay continued. In 2010, a group of volunteers formed a charity, Mapa Scotland SCIO. The charity secured Category B historic monument status for the map. The charity was to restore it to its original condition whilst promoting it as a heritage monument, educational resource and visitor attraction. In 2012, they obtained a £20,000 grant from the Heritage Lottery Fund, on the proviso they match this figure with funding from other sources and guarantee public access to the map. The matched funding was secured in 2013 thanks to grants from the Barony Castle Hotel, Borders Council and others.

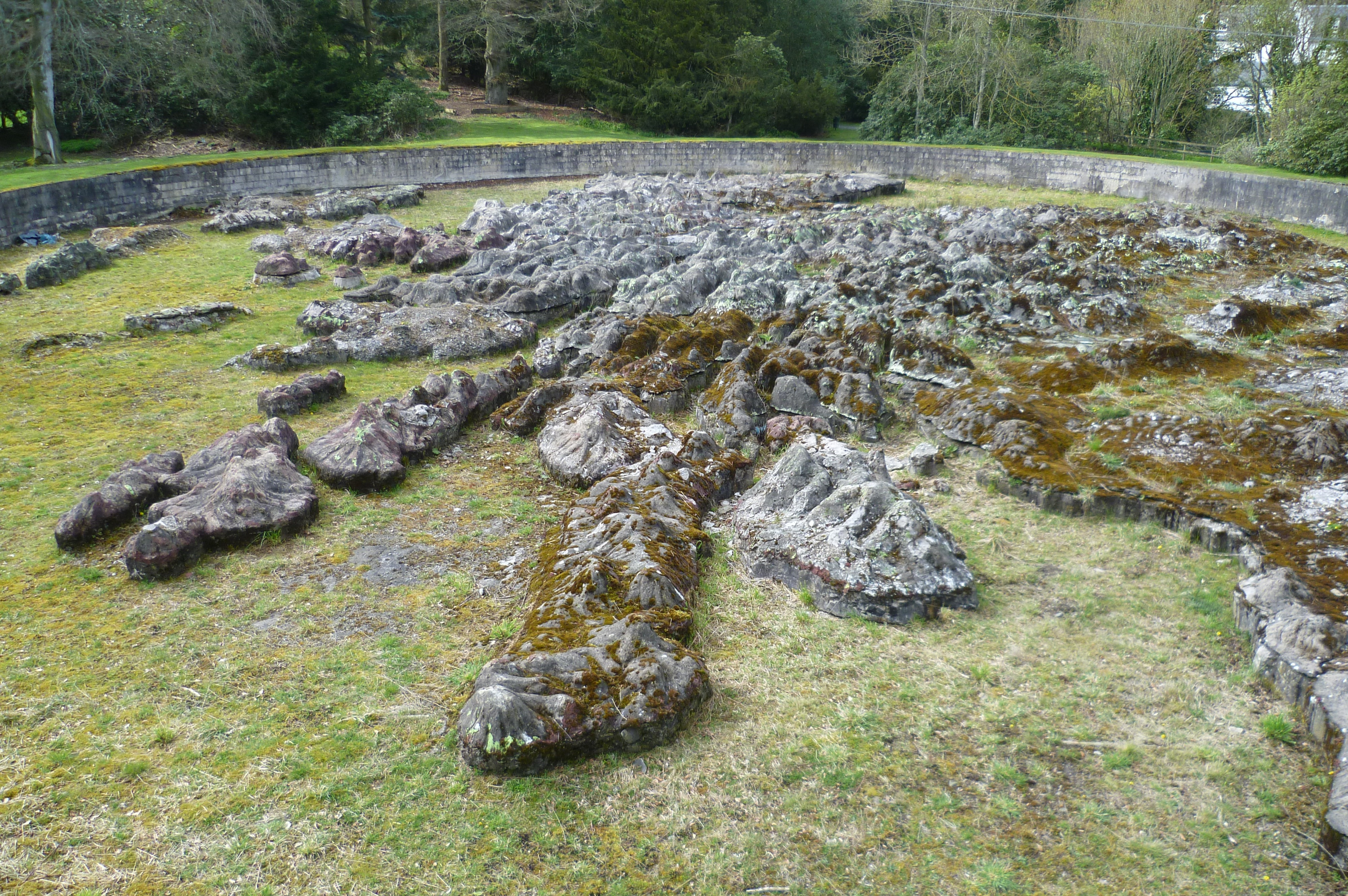
The west coast of Scotland viewed from Northern Ireland.

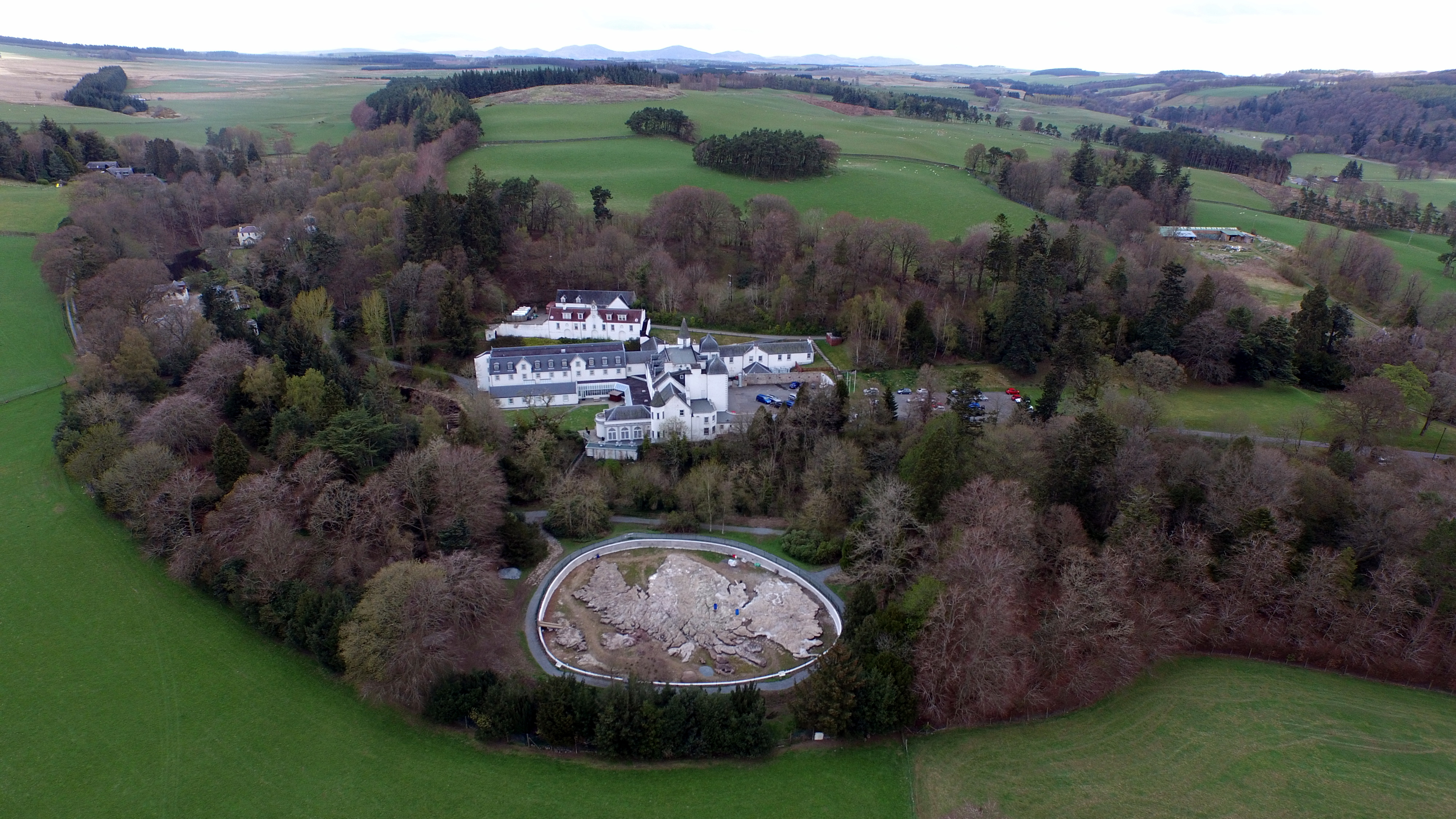
The castle and the map.

The then Polish Consul General in Scotland, Tomasz Trafas, brother of Professor Trafas, said in a newspaper interview that the map is "a rare symbol of the broader heritage and a symbol of the cultural links between Poland and Scotland since the 16th century that is worth preserving for the benefit of the local community and wider nation".

In May 2012, the MSP for Midlothian South, Tweeddale and Lauderdale, Christine Grahame, proposed a parliamentary motion (which was debated in September 2012) that the Scottish Parliament should recognise "the historic significance of The Great Polish Map of Scotland" and support the project.

Restoration works commenced in February 2014 and included the installation of a new safety fence, repair and re-rendering of the pit walls, installation of new coping stones, removal of debris, replacement of underground pipework, replacement of foundations and damaged concrete surface and construction of a new viewing tower. The surface of the map was then painted and the restoration completed in December 2017. The restored map was formally re-opened to the public on 12 April 2018. The 10 year lease held by the charity Mapa Scotland was relinquished to Barony Castle Hotel LLP on 30 June 2023. This change transferred full ownership of the map back to the landowner. The listed structure status of the map places maintenance responsibility on the owner. Mapa Scotland provided the owner with comprehensive maintenance instructions.

== Size ==
The Great Polish Map of Scotland measures approximately 50 by 40 metres (160 ft × 130 ft). It exceeds the surface area of the solid terrain model of British Columbia in the Crystal Garden, Victoria—74 by 40 feet (23 m × 12 m)—claimed to be the largest in the world (Mapa Scotland point out that the Scottish map is 2.8 times larger). The 'land' area alone of the Great Polish Map of Scotland is 780 square metres.

== Gallery ==
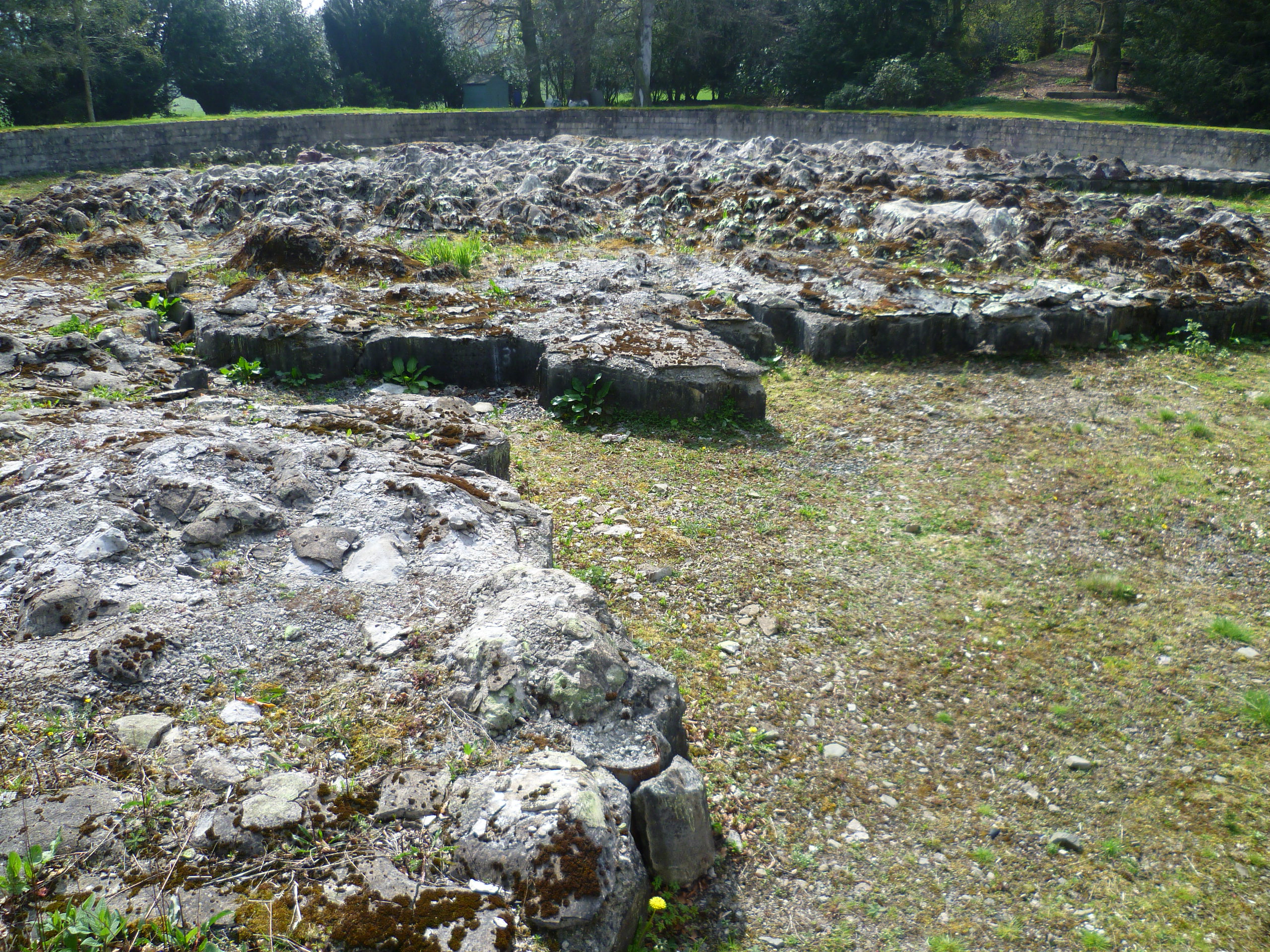
Forth Estuary and Fife

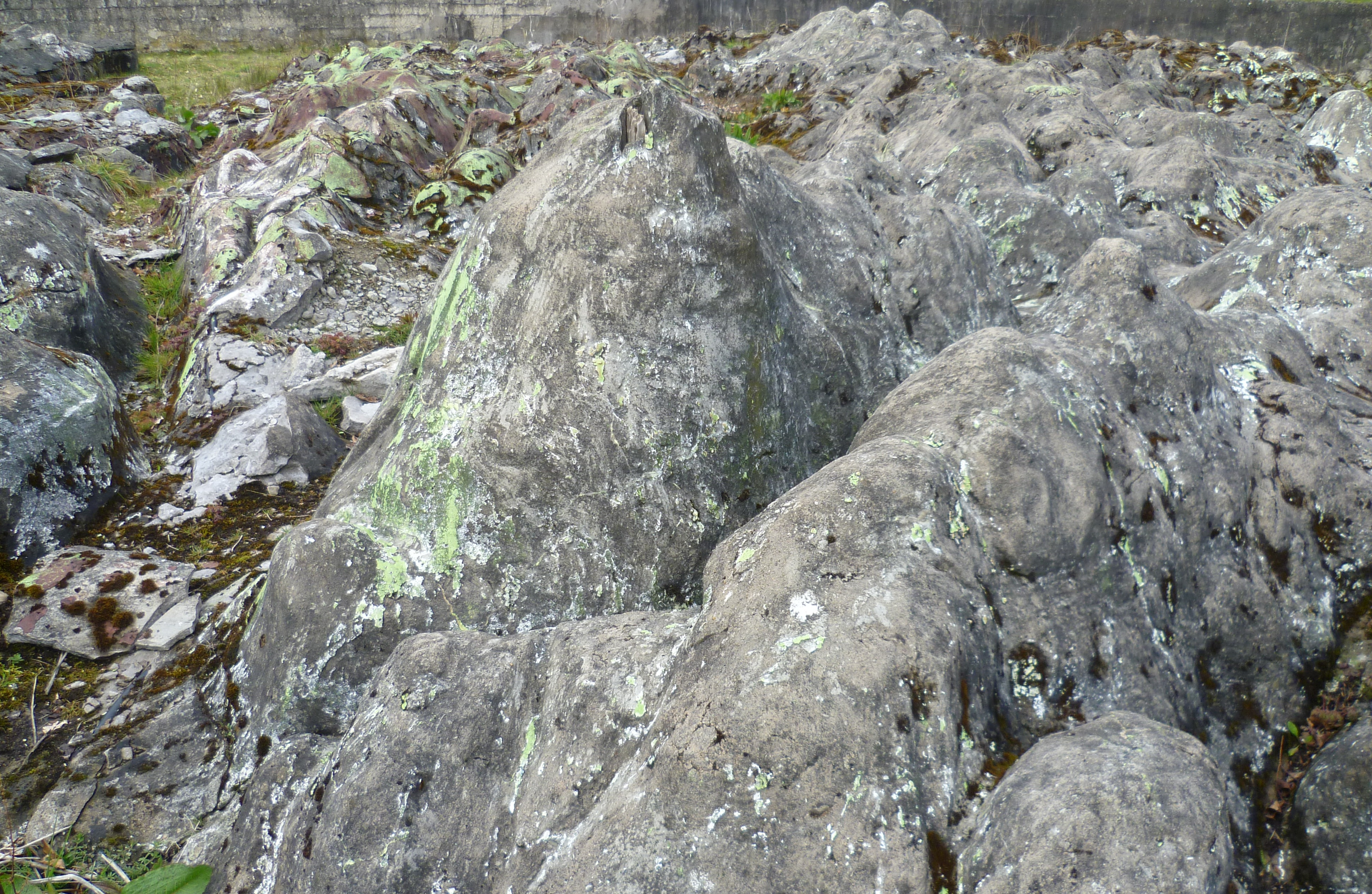
Ben Nevis

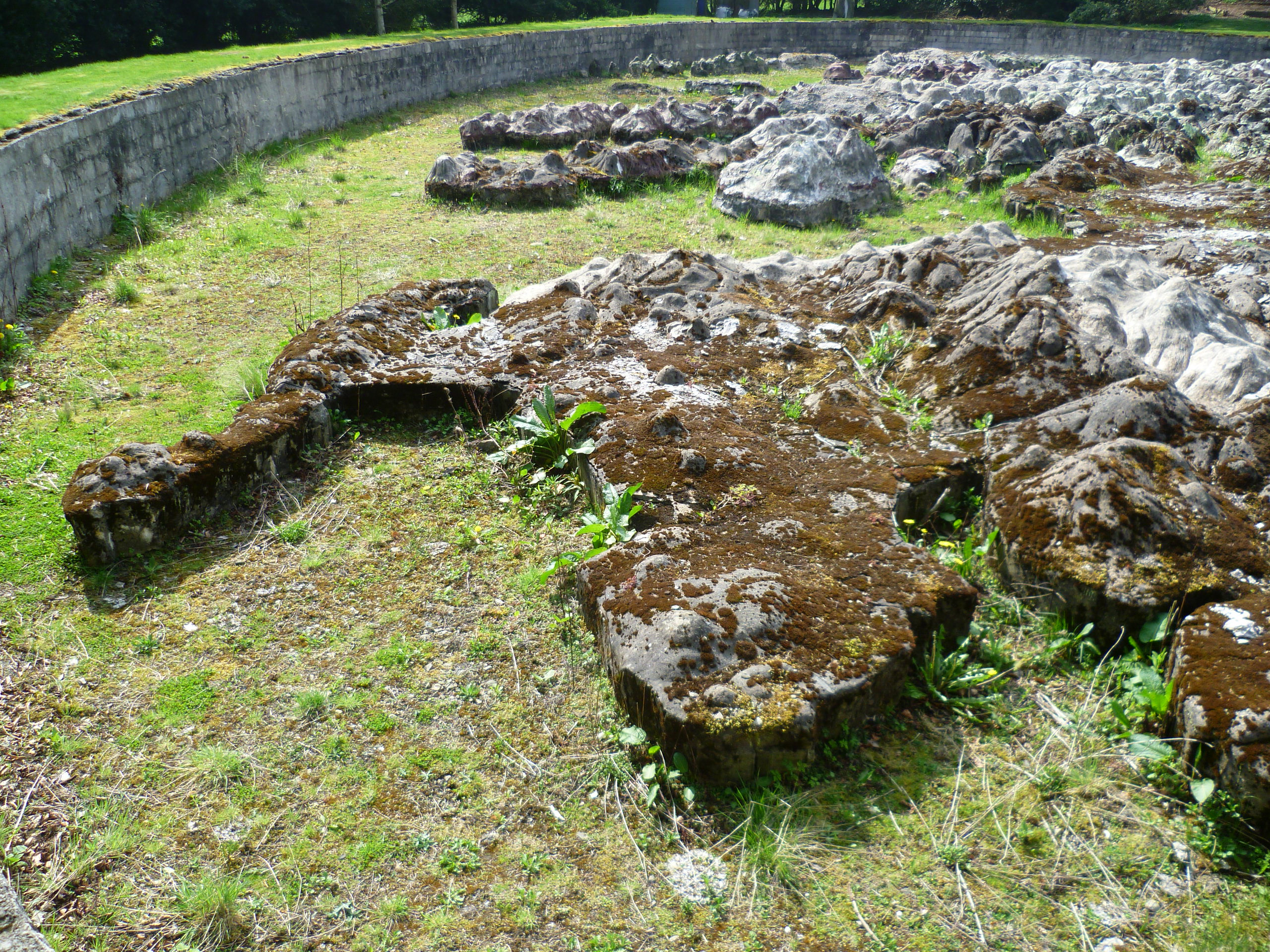
Galloway

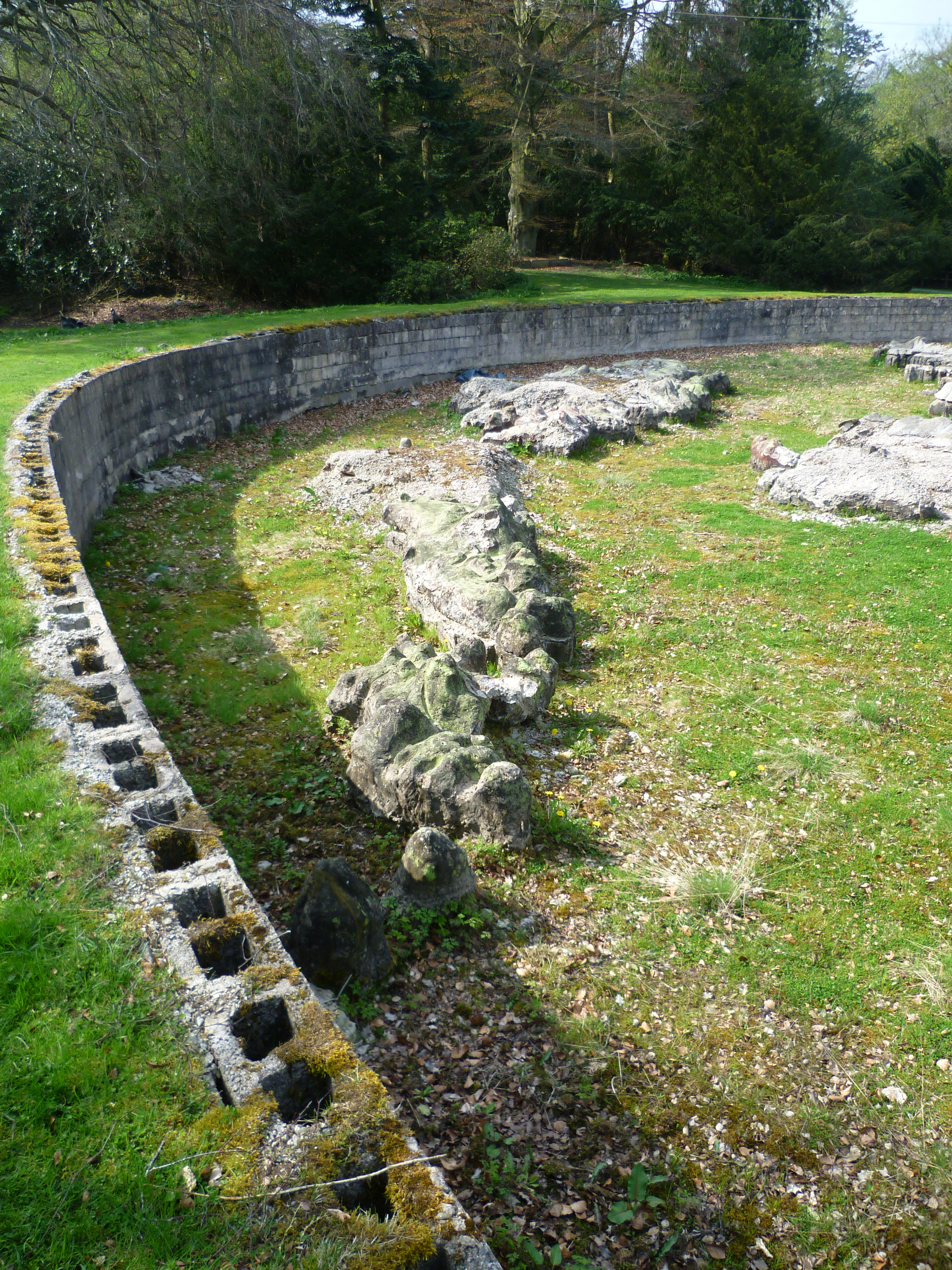
Outer Hebrides

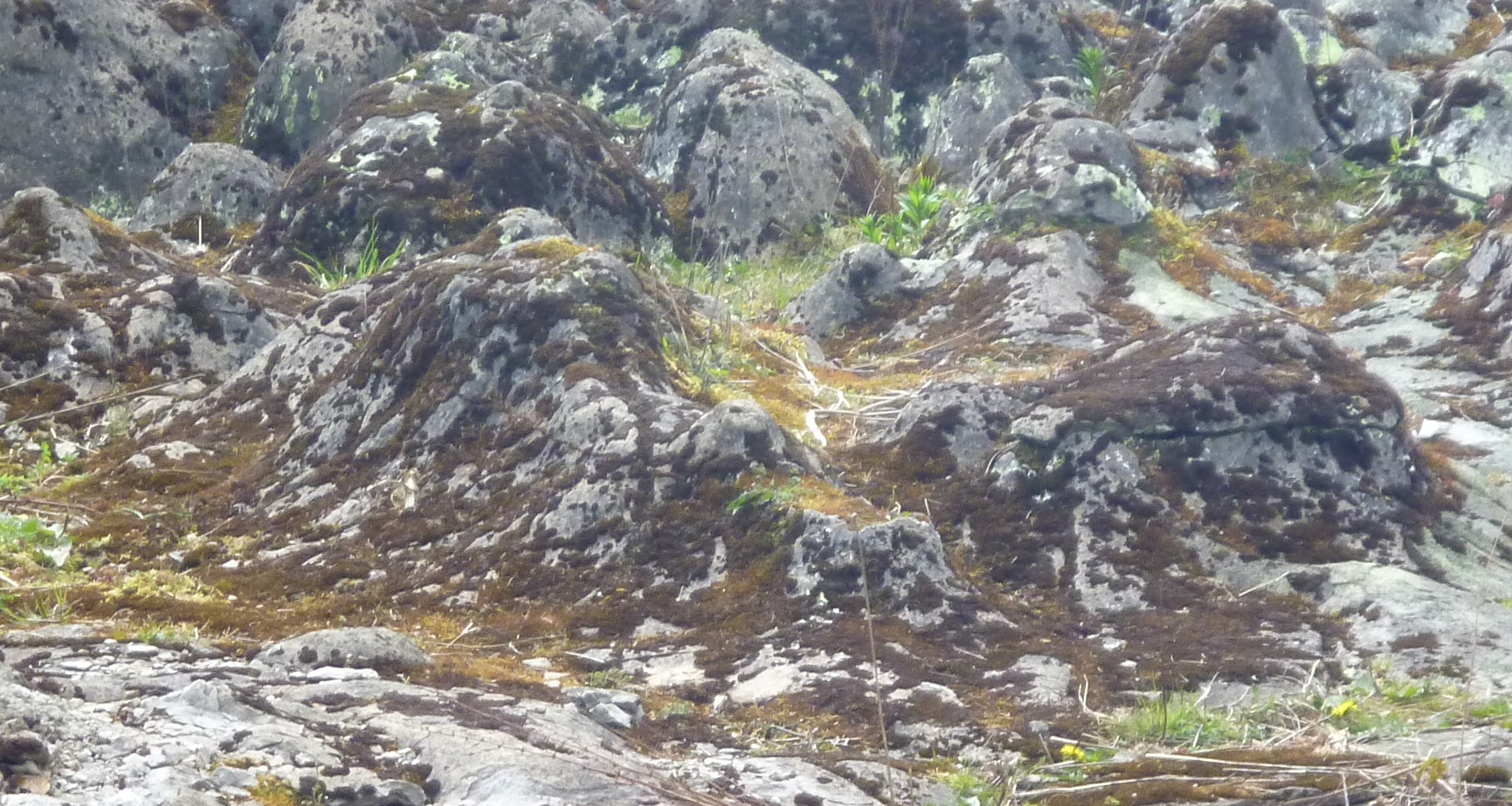
Ochil Hills

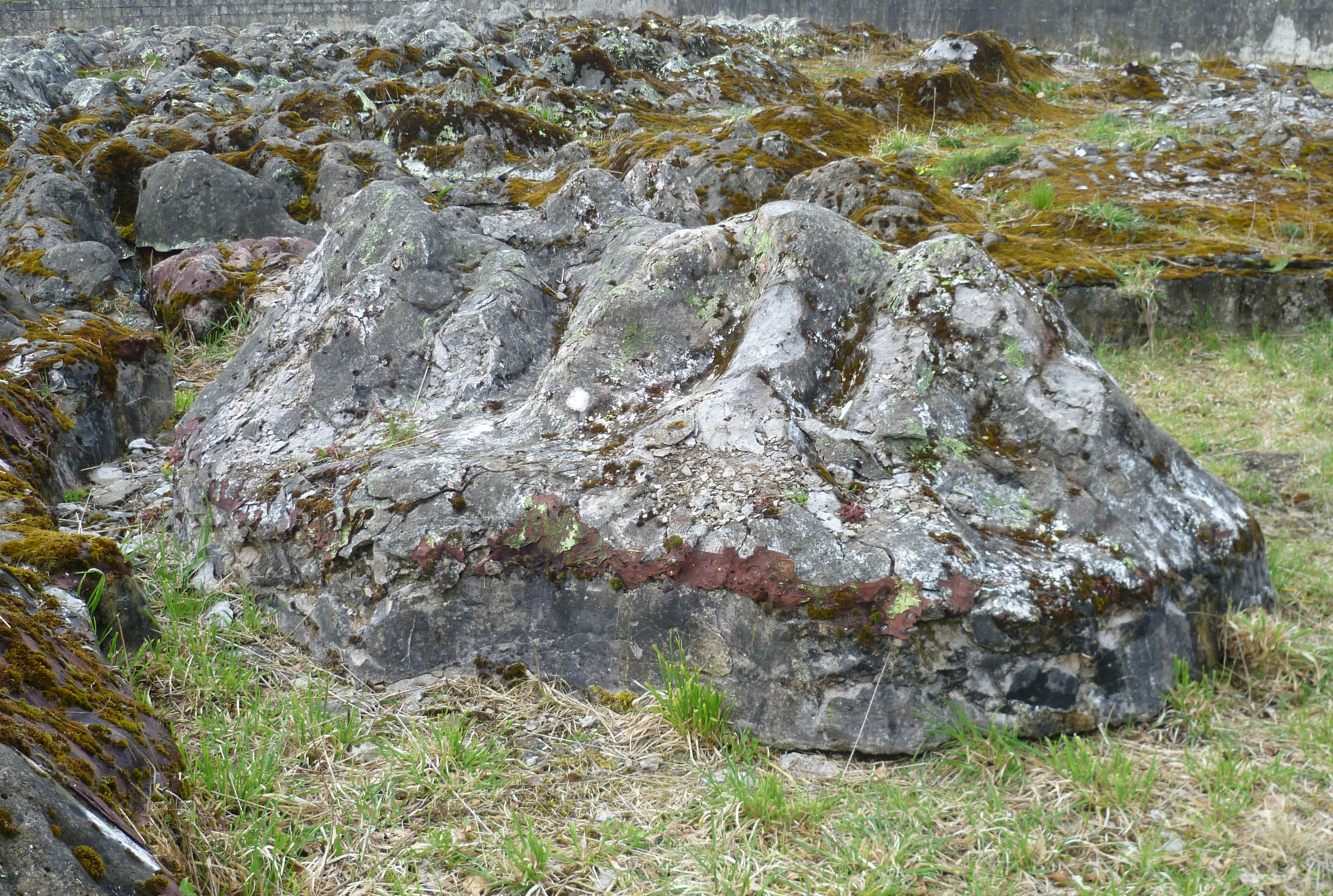
Isle of Arran

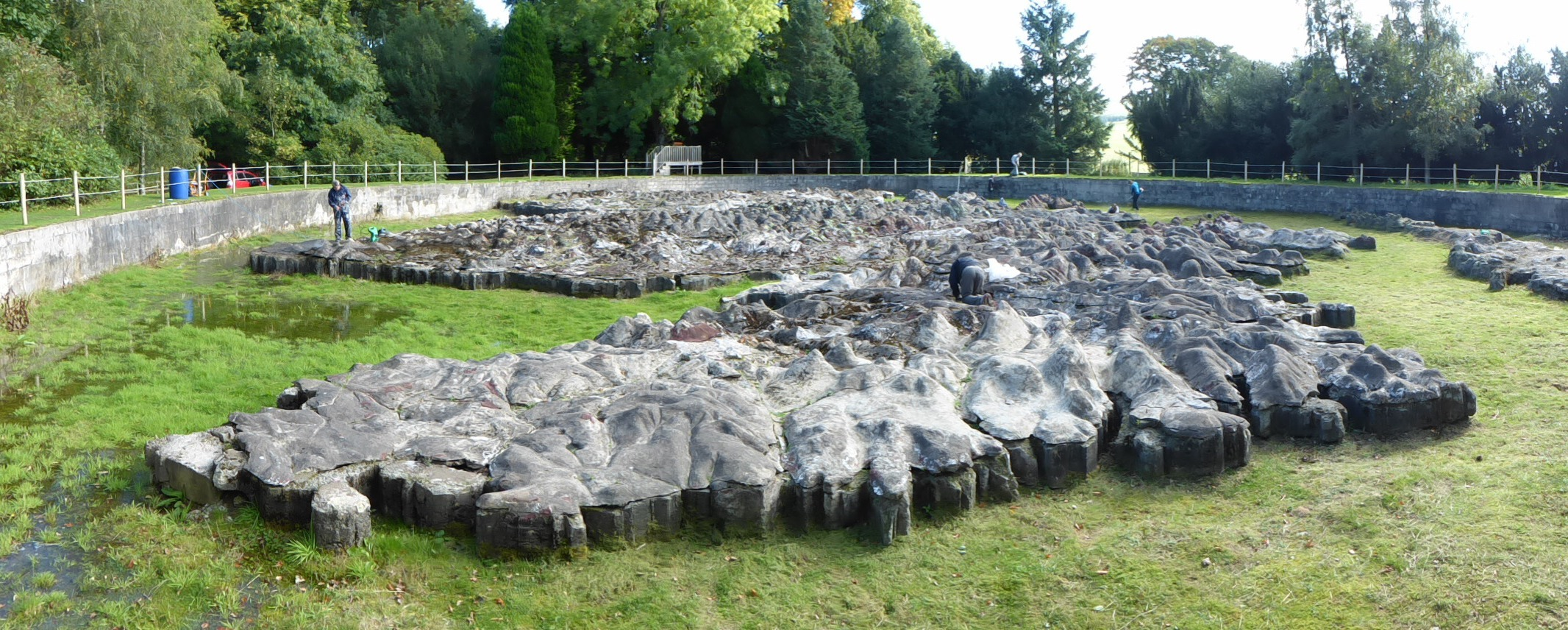
The map being prepared for restoration

== See also ==
- 1st Armoured Division (Poland)
- Scots in Poland
- Relief map of Guatemala
- World Map at Lake Klejtrup
