= Relief map of Guatemala =

Coordinates: 14°39′38″N 90°30′31″W

- Mapa en Relieve de Guatemala
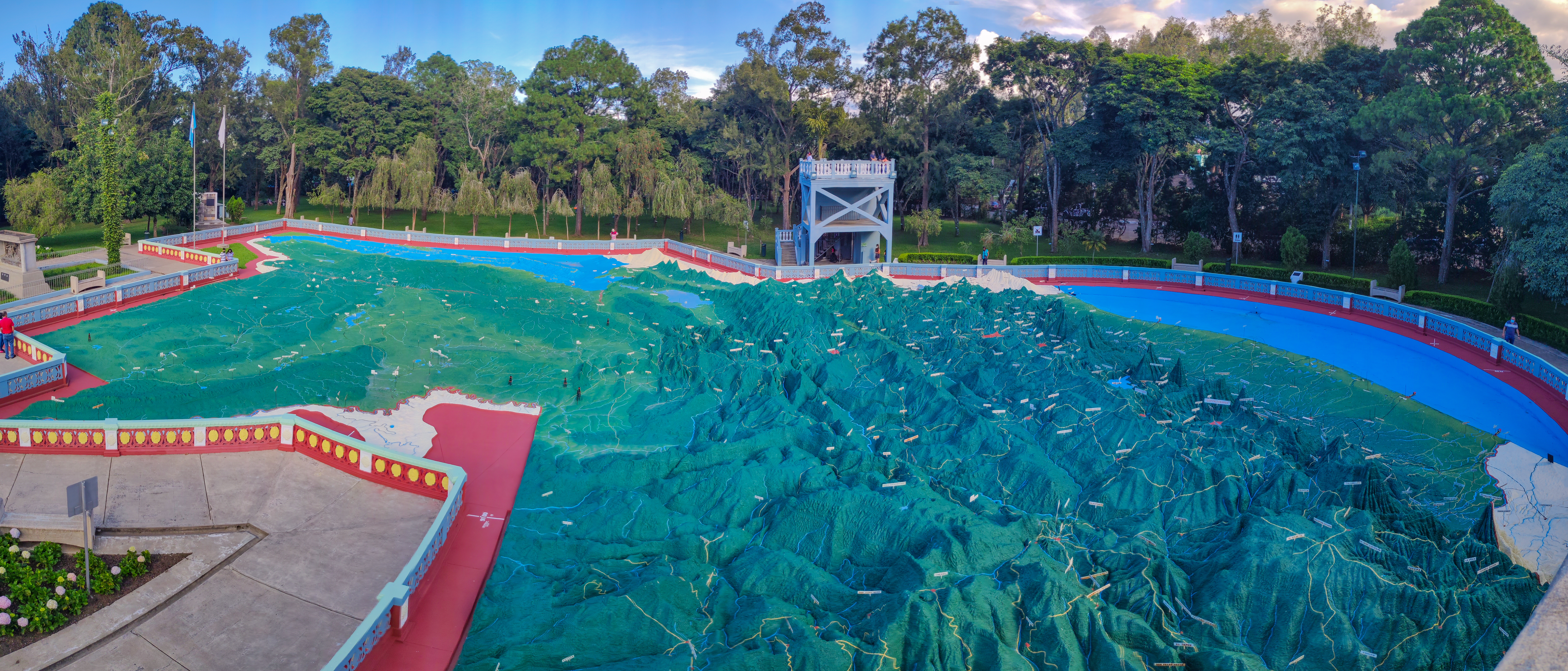
- The map in 2021
- Interactive map of the Relief map of Guatemala area
- Alternative names: Mapa en Relieve

General information
- Location: Guatemala City, Guatemala
- Construction started: 19 April 1904
- Completed: 29 October 1905
- Owner: Municipality of Guatemala City

Technical details
- Structural system: brick, mortar and cement lining

Design and construction
- Architect: Domingo Penedo
- Structural engineer: Francisco Vela
- Civil engineer: Claudio Urrutia
- Main contractor: A. Doninelli & Cia. (perimeter railing)

The Relief Map of Guatemala (in Spanish: Mapa en Relieve de Guatemala) is a huge relief map of Guatemala erected at ground level on two scales: 1: 10,000 for the horizontal extension and 1: 2,000 for the vertical, on an approximate surface of 1,800 square meters.

== Construction and restoration ==
The Map was built in 18 months, from April 19, 1904 to October 29, 1905, with brick, mortar and a cement lining by the Guatemalan lieutenant colonel and engineer Francisco Vela on behalf of the then President of Guatemala Manuel Estrada Cabrera with the support of engineer Claudio Urrutia, who already had the topographical data of the Republic of Guatemala. The base is made of stone and pumice stone was placed in the spaces corresponding to the Atlantic and Pacific Oceans. The contours are brick, the lines of the railroads made of lead and bridges made of steel.

Also, an underground tank of 60 cubic meters supplies the lakes and rivers, with an internal system of water currents based on the Theory of the level of the liquids by communicating vessels, which shows that the level operation and delimitation of the territory are exact, even in our days. The distribution box is located in the Los Cuchumatanes massif.

The perimeter wall near the map is a handrail made with a series of six decorative medallions that are repeated throughout. It has a height of 90 centimeters and was built in the industrial artistic workshop A. Doninelli & Cía. The medallions are oval with bas-reliefs on the obverse, corresponding to allegories and symbols of the history of Guatemala.

The Relief Map has been remodeled twice: in 1980 by the Guatemalan Tourism Institute and the collaboration of the Municipality of Guatemala City, and in 2014 by the Municipality of Guatemala City.

== Exhibition hall ==
The Relief Map also has an exhibition hall that has a photographic exhibition called "Guatemala Siglo XVIII" (Guatemala in the 18th century). In the tour the images presented, combined with explanatory texts, place the visitor in the movements that were decisive to decide the transfer of the city to the Valley of the Ermita in 1776.

== Sound Forest of Hormigo ==
Recognized as the only one that commemorates the composers and marimba performers of the world, the Sound Forest of Hormigo (Spanish: Bosque Sonoro del Hormigo) is located in the eastern part of the facilities of the Relief Map. His name was given by his initiators, Carlos Francsico Marroquín, supported by his father Antonio Marroquín, and seconded by the board of directors of the Guatemalan Association of Authors and Composers, who began to plant trees of hormigo, declared as the Tree of Culture, of the Marimba and the Peace, and whose wood is used for the construction of the national instrument, between 1983 and 1984.

This forest offers in its interior a collection of more than 100 trees of hormigo, where each one was planted in honor to a recognized composer or Guatemalan marimba performer, and takes its name inscribed in a plaque placed to a flank of the forest.

== See also ==
- Great Polish Map of Scotland
- World Map at Lake Klejtrup
