= World Map at Lake Klejtrup =

Miniature world map in Klejtrup Sø, Denmark

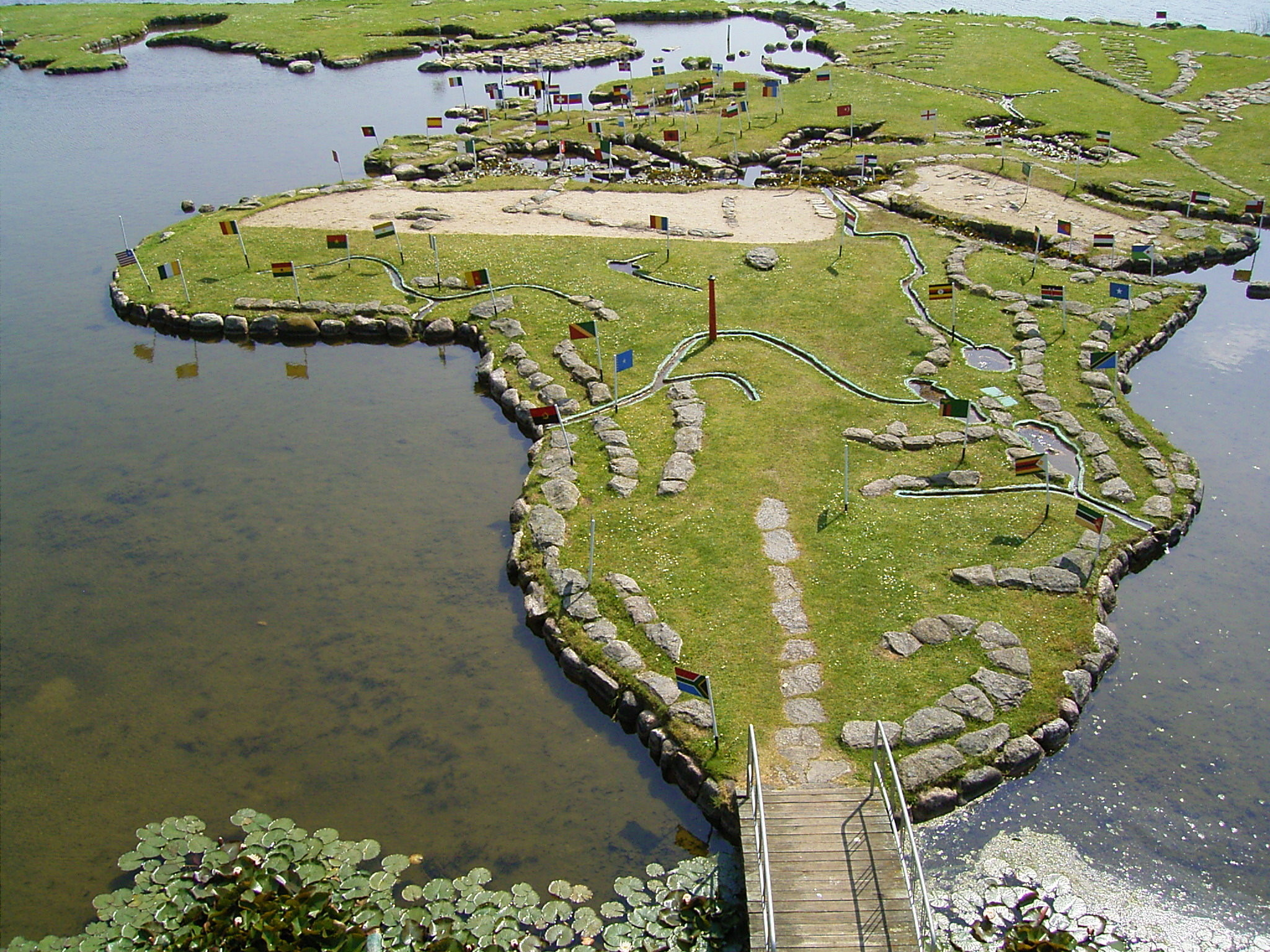
- Europe and Africa

- Location: 56.5906°N 9.6416°E

The World Map at Lake Klejtrup (Danish: Verdenskortet ved Klejtrup Sø) is a miniature world map built of stones and grass in Klejtrup Sø near the village of Klejtrup, Viborg Municipality, Denmark.

== History ==
In 1943, Søren Poulsen, a local farmer, was working on the drainage of the surrounding meadows when he found a stone shaped like the Jutland peninsula. This inspired him to create a small world of his own. During the winter months, with the use of primitive tools, he placed big stones carefully on the ice. When spring arrived, the stones could easily be tilted into place, and in this way the World Map took shape. Some of the stones used weighed more than 2 tonnes.

Poulsen created the World Map between 1944 and 1969. It measures 45 by 90 metres (49 by 98 yards), covering an area of over 4000 square meters (1 acre). One 111-kilometre (69 mi) degree of latitude corresponds to 27 centimetres (11 inches) on the map. On Poulsen's map, Antarctica is not present and the Northern Hemisphere is marked in two places, ensuring a better impression of the correct distances between the countries to avoid the difficulties of spreading out the planet's globular shape. Red poles mark the equator, and each country is represented by miniature flags, which are updated yearly. State borders in the United States of America are marked with yellow bricks; Poulsen lived 20 years in America.

The map is the epicenter of a park, which has, among other attractions, a picnic area, a coffee shop and a playground.

The World Map is an important attraction in the area, and attracts about 40,000 visitors per year, most of them Danish.

== Gallery ==
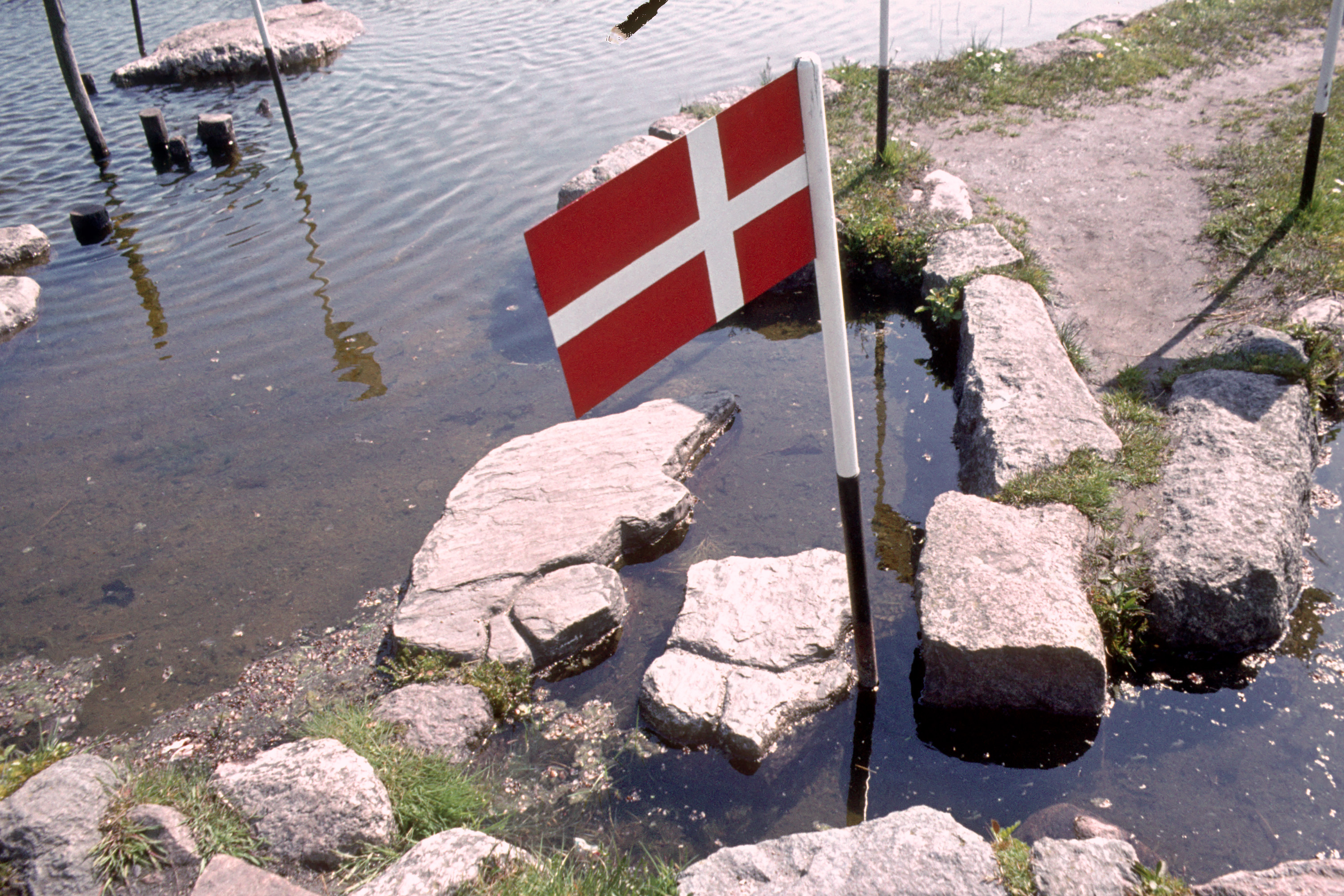
Denmark

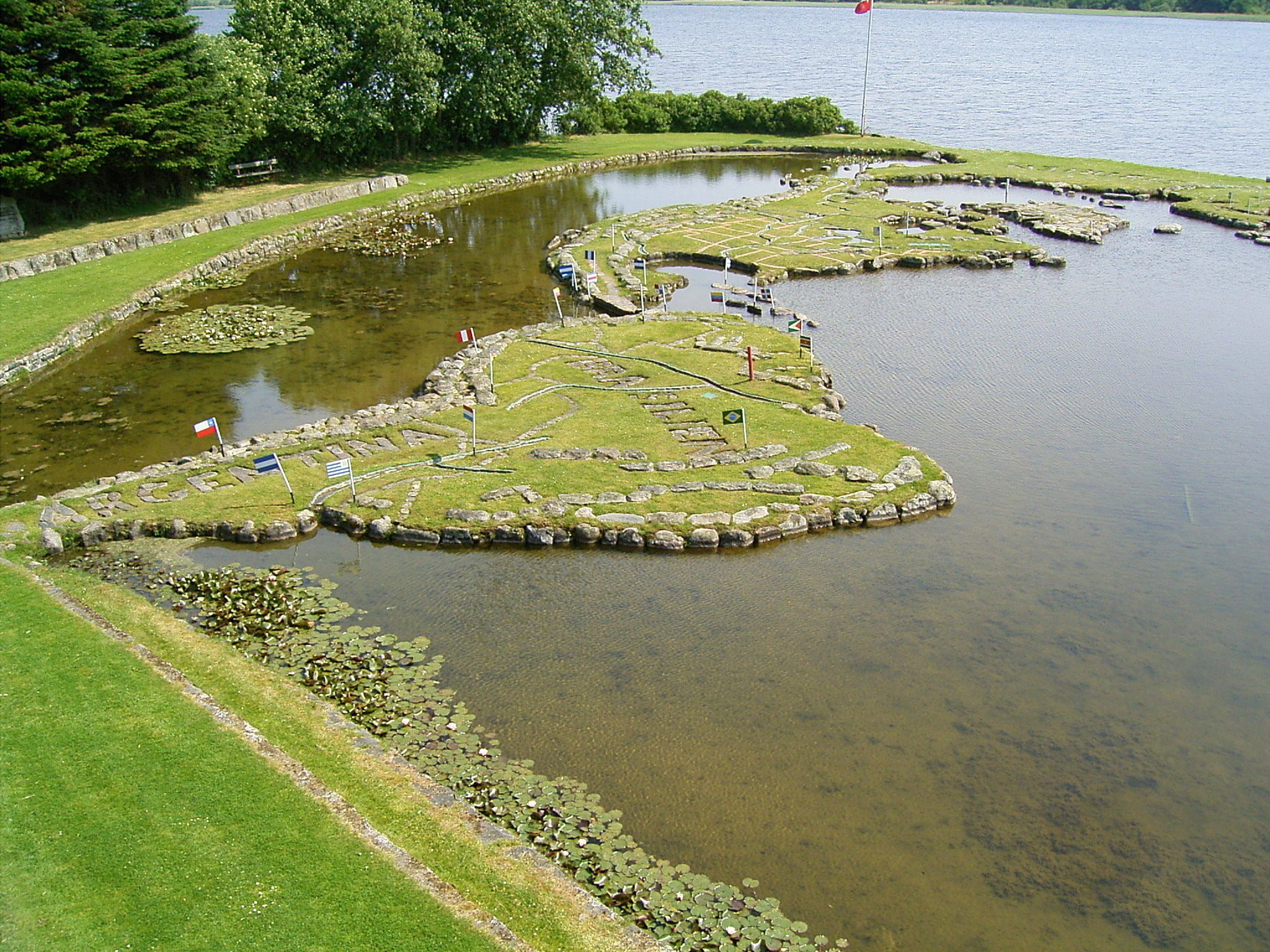
The Americas

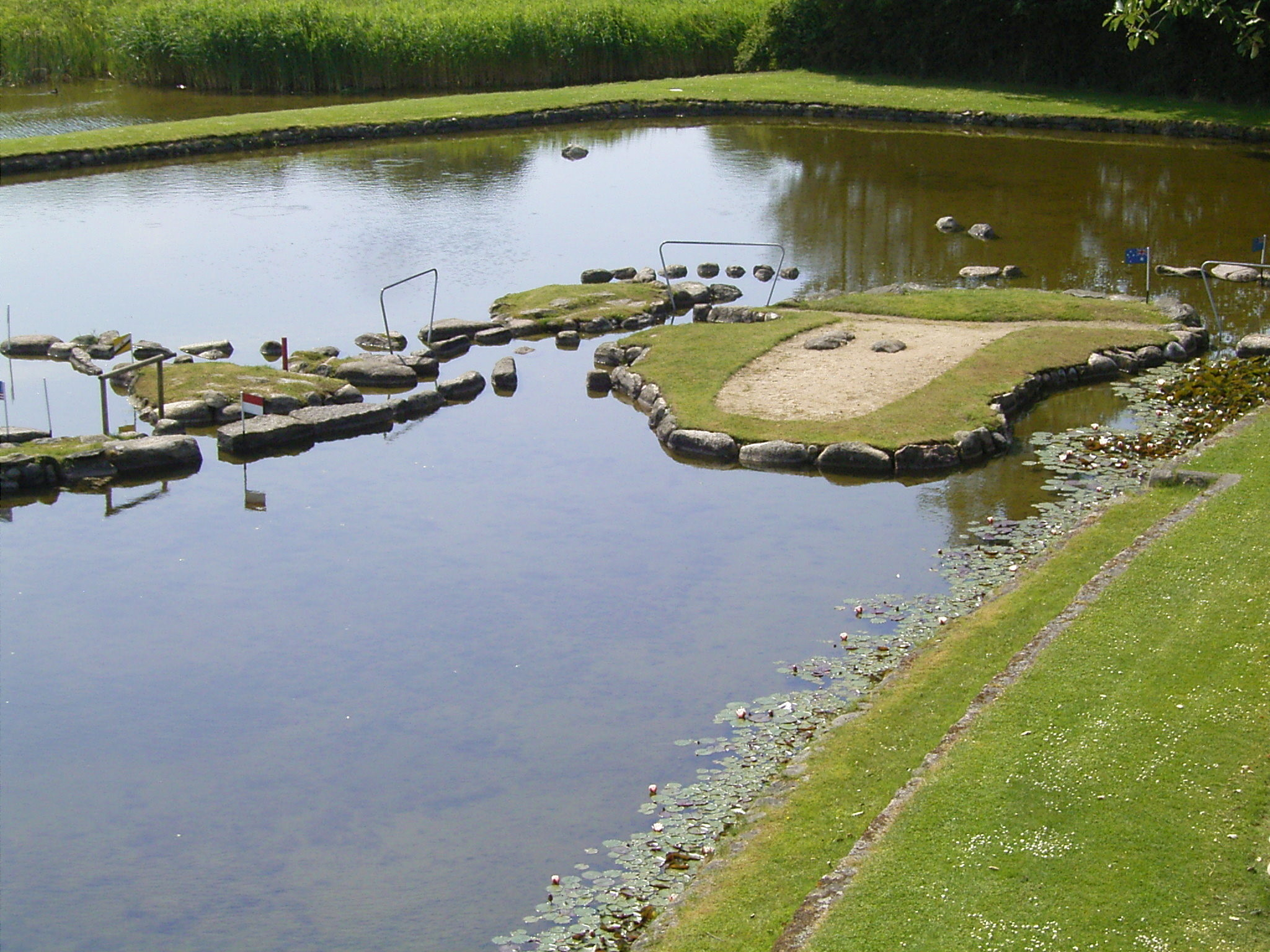
Indonesia, Australia and New Zealand

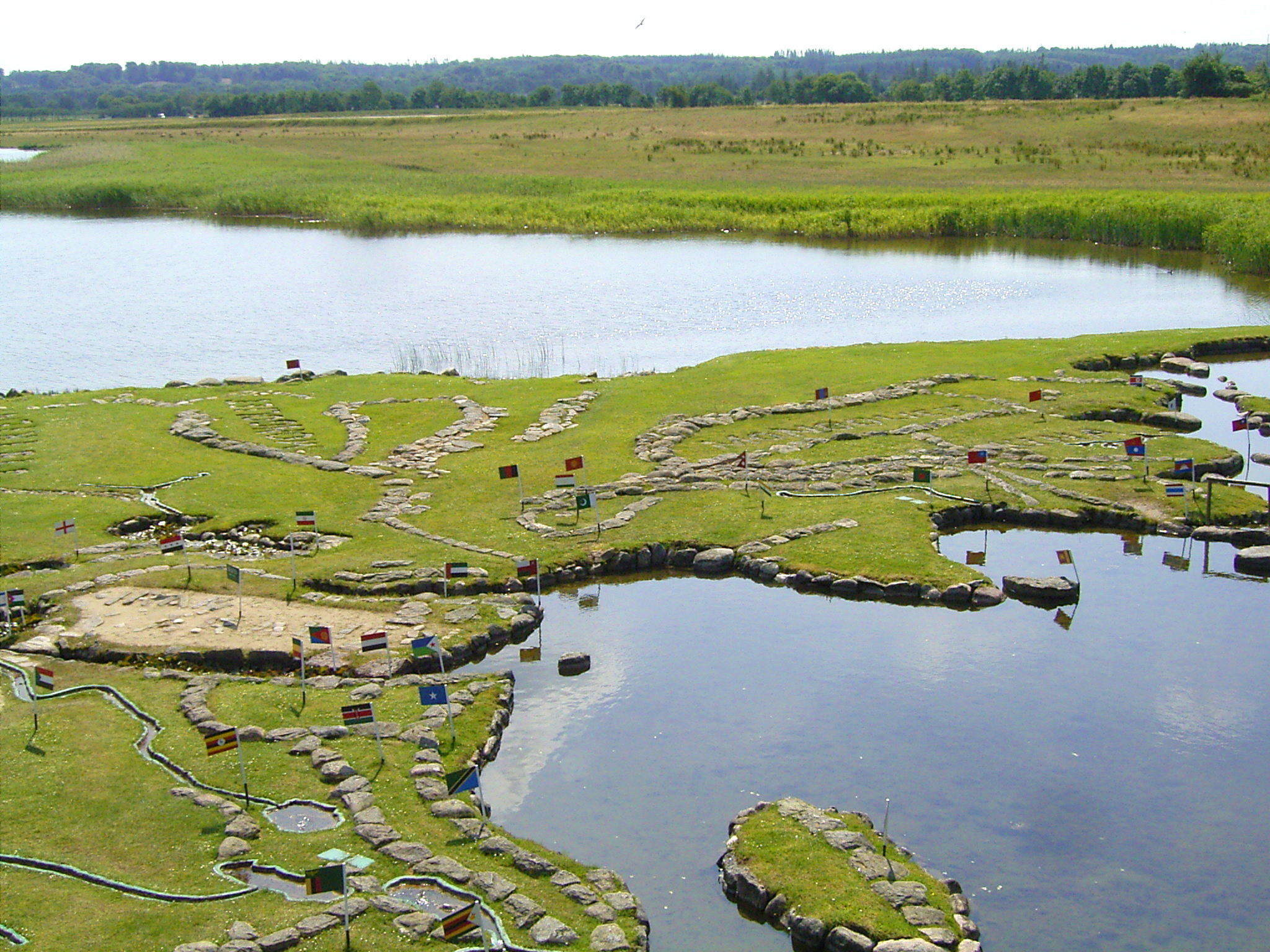
Asia and the Middle East

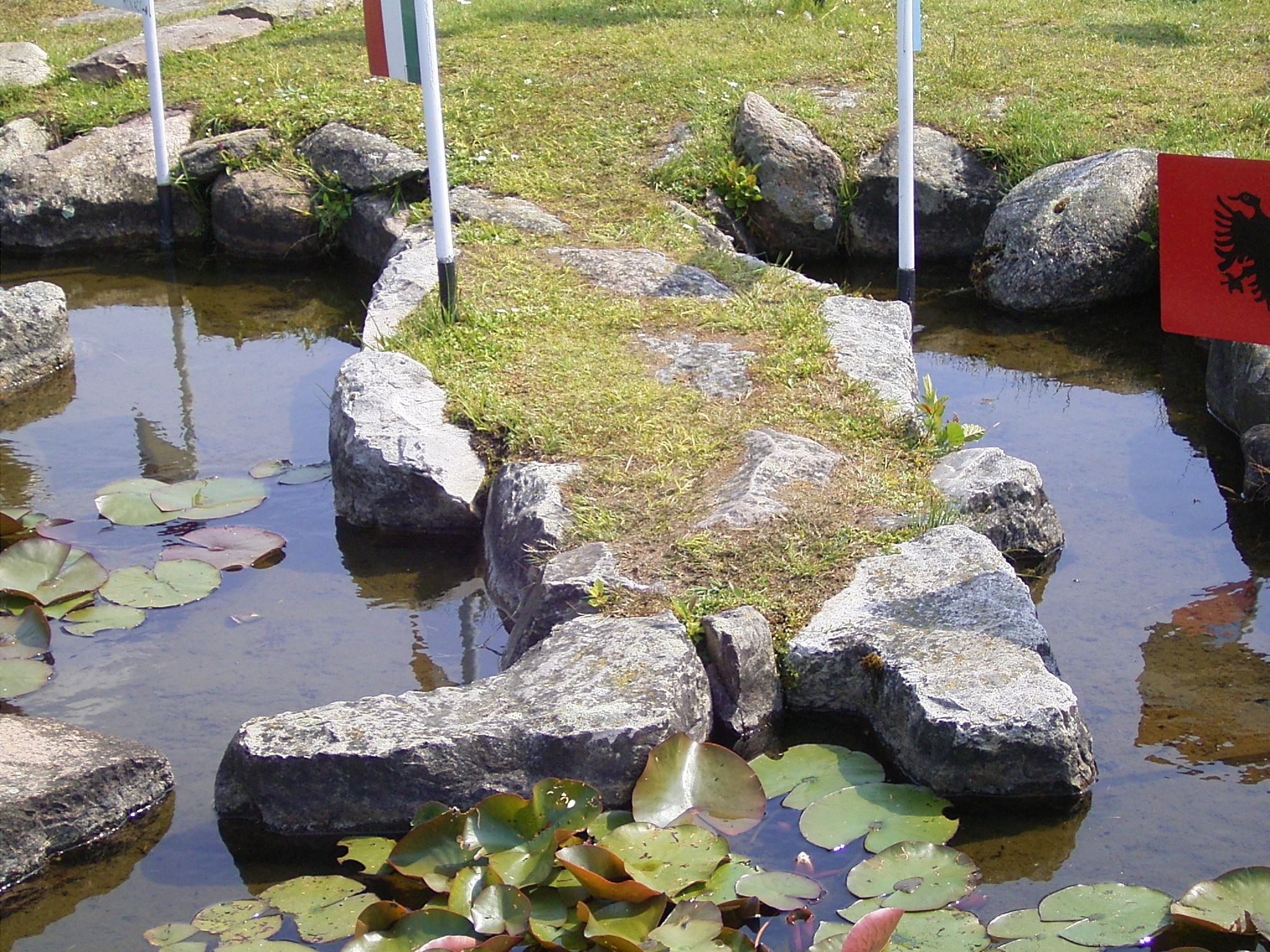
Italy

== See also ==
- Great Polish Map of Scotland
- Relief map of Guatemala
