= Vertical exaggeration =

Scale used in relief maps

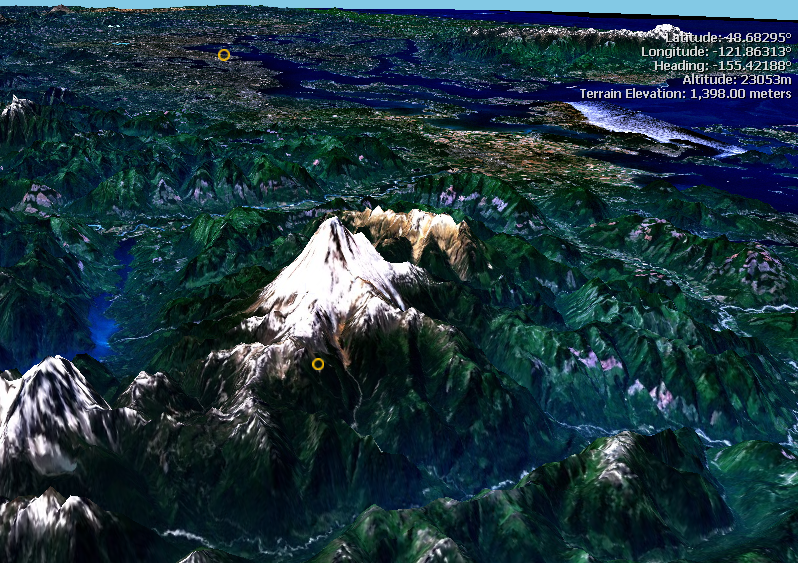
A vertically exaggerated mountain. In reality, the terrain would appear much flatter.

Vertical exaggeration (VE) is a scale that is used in raised-relief maps, plans and technical drawings (cross section perspectives), in order to emphasize vertical features, which might be too small to identify relative to the horizontal scale.

== Scaling Factor ==
The vertical exaggeration is given by:

$$\mathit{VE} = \mathit\frac{VS}{HS}$$

where VS is the vertical scale and HS is the horizontal scale, both given as representative fractions.

For example, if 1 centimetre (0.39 in) vertically represents 200 metres (660 ft) and 1 centimetre (0.39 in) horizontally represents 4,000 metres (13,000 ft), the vertical exaggeration, 20×, is given by:

$$\mathit{VE} = \frac{\frac{1}{200}}{\frac{1}{4000}} = \frac{4000}{200} = 20$$.

Vertical exaggeration is given as a number; for example 5× means vertical measurements appear 5 times greater than horizontal measurements. A value of 1× indicates that horizontal and vertical scales are identical, and is regarded as having "no vertical exaggeration." Vertical exaggerations less than 1 are not common, but would indicate a reduction in vertical scale (or, equivalently, a horizontal exaggeration).

== Criticism ==
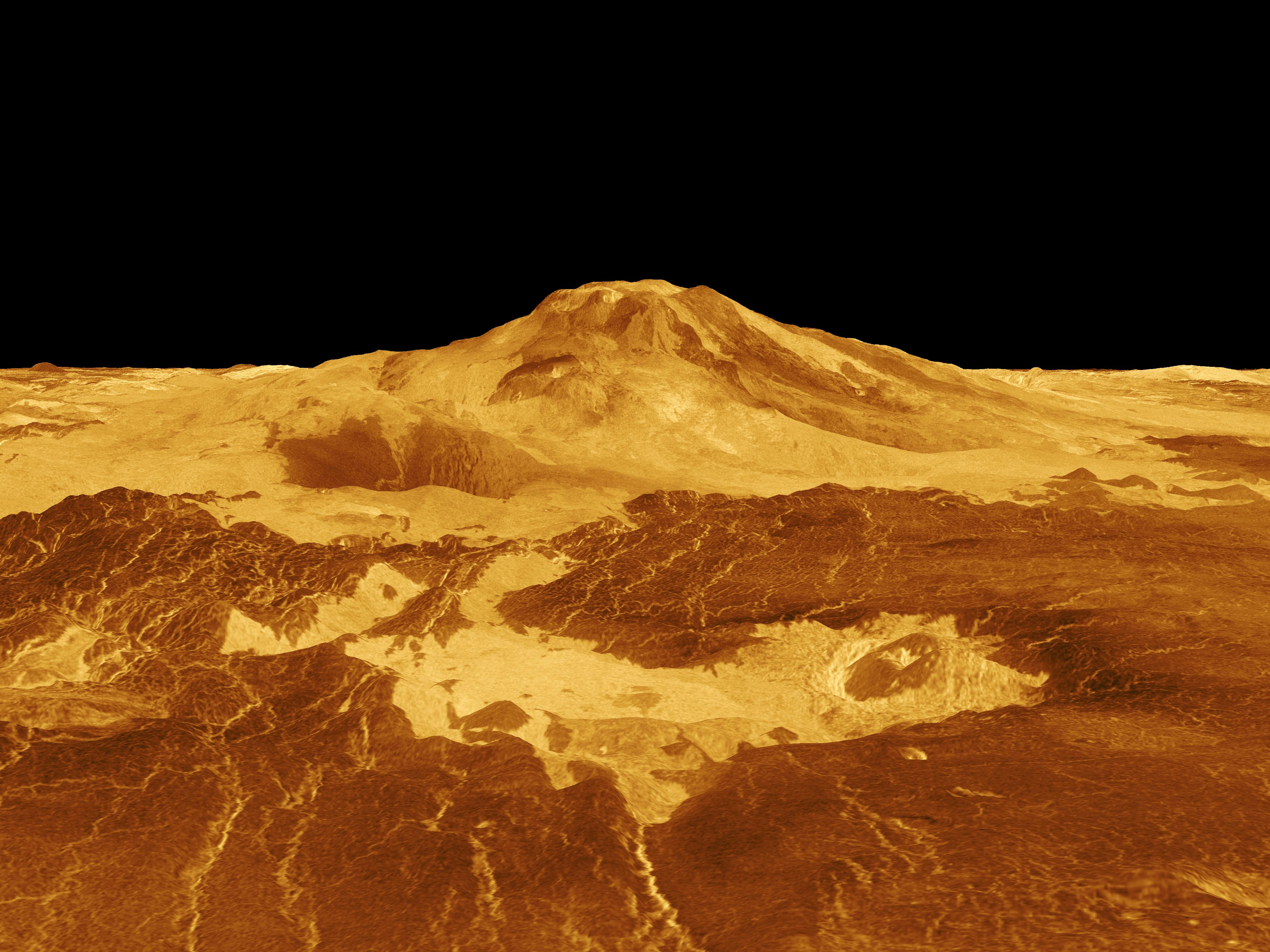
A NASA projection of Maat Mons on Venus, with vertical exaggeration used to emphasize the mountain's height.

Some scientists object to vertical exaggeration as a tool that makes an oblique visualization dramatic at the cost of misleading the viewer about the true appearance of the landscape.

In some cases, if the vertical exaggeration is too high, the map reader may get confused.
