= Edinburgh Water Company =

Scottish water and sewage utility

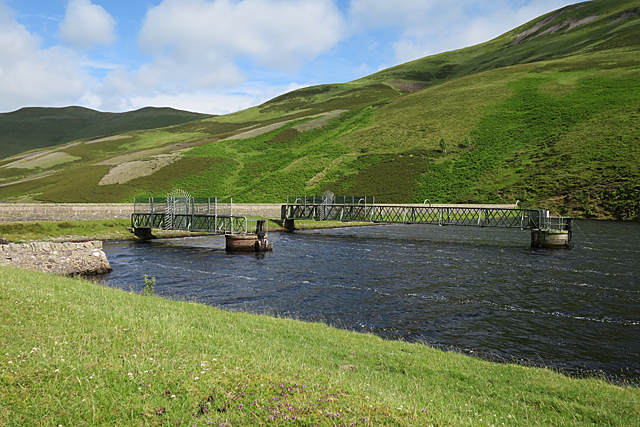
- Twin outlet towers were a characteristic of many of James Leslie's reservoirs built for Edinburgh Water Company.
- Industry: Water
- Founded: 1819
- Defunct: 1870
- Fate: Taken over
- Successor: Edinburgh Water Trust
- Headquarters: Edinburgh, Scotland

Edinburgh Water Company and its successors have provided a public water supply and latterly sewerage and sewage treatment services to the Scottish capital of Edinburgh since 1819. The original company was established to supply drinking water and did so until 1870, when it was taken over by a public water trust, with representatives from Edinburgh, Leith and Portobello. The company built an associated railway, the Talla Railway and a rural manor house, with an associated station Victoria Lodge railway station. The trust was taken over by Edinburgh Corporation and in 1975, responsibility passed to the Lothian Regional Council, as did the duty to provide sewerage and sewage treatment services. Both services were moved out of local authority control, and taken over by the East of Scotland Water Authority in 1996. The three Scottish regional water authorities were merged to form Scottish Water in 2002.

During the time of the Edinburgh Water Company and the Edinburgh Water Trust, major projects were carried out to construct reservoirs, some for the impounding of water supplies, and others to provide compensation water, to ensure that rivers could still provide water power to mills, when some of their sources had been tapped to supply Edinburgh. James Jardine was the company's first engineer, and was succeeded by James Leslie, who became part of J & A Leslie and Reid, when he entered into partnership with his son Alexander Leslie and son-in-law Robert Reid in the early 1870s. The last major project of this early period was Talla Reservoir, completed in 1905, but there were further civil engineering projects in the 1960s and 1980s. Alexander Leslie compiled a dosier of photographs, showing the construction of some of the later Victorian reservoirs, which has recently been rediscovered in the archives of Edinburgh Library.

With the population growing rapidly, a major project to divert sewage away from the Water of Leith, the main river through the city, took place in 1864, probably with Napier Bell as the engineer. A new sewer intercepted the existing sewers and drains, and carried the raw sewage to the sea. Edinburgh did not have a sewage treatment works until 1978, when construction of Seafield Treatment Works on reclaimed land near Leith Docks was completed. It now produces 2.3 MW of electric power, generated from the gas which is a product of the sludge digesters which treat the effluent, and it is expected to become self-sufficient for power in the near future.

== History ==
The City of Edinburgh had a number of wells, from which water could be obtained, and Nor Loch also acted as a source for water. Water was first brought in from outside the city in 1676, when a 3-inch (7.6 cm) lead pipe was installed from springs at Comiston, now a suburb to the south of the city. As more water was required, additional springs in Comiston were tapped, and the pipe was progressively replaced by a 5-inch (13 cm) lead pipe between 1704 and 1720. Iron pipework replaced the lead in 1820. The network was extended in 1760, when wooden pipes were laid into the city from springs near Swanston, a little further to the south, but now also a suburb. 7-inch (18 cm) iron pipes replaced the wooden pipes around 1790, but there was then a lull in development due to the Napoleonic Wars. The piped water reached a fairly limited number of dwellings, and many people had to buy water from water porters, called 'caddies' locally, who were registered by the magistrates, and sold water for one penny for a barrel containing 5 to 6 imperial gallons (23 to 27 L).

Edinburgh Water Company's Act 1819
- Act of Parliament
- Parliament of the United Kingdom
- Long title: An Act for more effectually supplying the City of Edinburgh and Places adjacent with Water.
- Citation: 59 Geo. 3. c. cxvi

Dates
- Royal assent: 2 July 1819

Other legislation
- Repealed by: Edinburgh Corporation Order Confirmation Act 1958

Status: Repealed

Text of statute as originally enacted

Edinburgh Water Company's Act 1826
- Act of Parliament
- Parliament of the United Kingdom
- Long title: An Act for more effectually supplying the City of Edinburgh and Places adjacent with Water; and for supplying the Town and Port of Leith and Places adjacent, and His Majesty's Dock Yards at Leith, with Water.
- Citation: 7 Geo. 4. c. cviii

Dates
- Royal assent: 1826

Other legislation
- Repealed by: Edinburgh Corporation Order Confirmation Act 1958

Status: Repealed

Text of statute as originally enacted

Edinburgh Water Company's Act 1835
- Act of Parliament
- Parliament of the United Kingdom
- Long title: An Act to enable the Edinburgh Water Company to borrow a further Sum of Money.
- Citation: 5 & 6 Will. 4. c. xxxiii

Dates
- Royal assent: 17 June 1835

Other legislation
- Repealed by: Edinburgh Water Company's Act 1847

Status: Repealed

There was general disquiet that the supply of water was "extremely deficient both in quantity and quality," and the editor of the Edinburgh Review, Francis Jeffrey, convened a public meeting, at which a committee was formed to take the matter forwards. The committee included two prominent authors, Henry Mackenzie and Henry Cockburn. The Edinburgh Water Company was formed, and obtained an act of Parliament, the Edinburgh Water Company's Act 1819 (59 Geo. 3. c. cxvi) in July 1819. This authorised several schemes, including obtaining water from the Crawley springs, some 6 miles (9.7 km) to the south of Edinburgh in the Pentland Hills, an idea that had first been suggested by Thomas Telford in 1811. They could also take water from the Glencorse Burn, and in order to maintain supplies to mill owners on the River Esk, the Glencorse Reservoir was to be built, as a source of compensation water.

James Jardine was appointed as the company's first engineer, who had been involved in the construction of the Union Canal, and who had also been the first person to work out the mean level of the sea. He was responsible for the pipeline from Crawley springs, which was 8.5 miles (13.7 km) long, as it followed the contours, and acted as resident engineer for the Glencorse dam, with Telford acting as the chief designer. The water pipeline, which varied in diameter from 15 to 20 inches (38 to 51 cm), was completed in August 1823, and delivered 1,500,000 imperial gallons (6.8 Ml) per day to the city. The Glencorse dam, which impounded 368 million imperial gallons (1,670 Ml) of water, was one of the tallest earth dams at the time it was built, with the crest around 120 feet (37 m) above ground level. The total cost of these projects was around £145,000, and they received high praise from The Scotsman newspaper. Jardine had originally calculated water levels and potential yields from the springs in the Pentland Hills in 1810, while working for Telford.

Edinburgh Water Company's Act 1843
- Act of Parliament
- Parliament of the United Kingdom
- Long title: An Act to enable the Edinburgh Water Company to bring in an additional Supply of Water; and to alter and amend the Acts relating to the said Company.
- Citation: 6 & 7 Vict. c. lxxxix

Dates
- Royal assent: 1 August 1843

Other legislation
- Repealed by: Edinburgh Corporation Order Confirmation Act 1958

Status: Repealed

Text of statute as originally enacted

The new scheme worked well until 1842, when there was a severe drought, resulting in many of the smaller streams and brooks drying up completely. Less than 12 inches (300 mm) of rain fell between April and October, and the Glencorse Reservoir emptied. Millers on the River Esk demanded that water from the Crawley springs should be diverted into the Glencorse Burn, and this was only avoided by paying them an indemnity of between £4,000 and £5,000. The company rushed through the Edinburgh Water Company's Act 1843 (6 & 7 Vict. c. lxxxix) to allow them to abstract water from streams at Listonshiels, Bavelaw and Black Springs, all of which are on the north side of the Pentland Hills. Two more reservoirs were required to provide compensation water, at Threipmuir and Harlaw, and despite difficulties in buying the required land, Jardine pressed on with the project. However, he retired in 1846 before either reservoir had been finished, having reached the age of 70, and it was James Leslie who took over and saw them completed.

=== James Leslie ===
Leslie had previously worked with Jardine on a report about a water supply scheme for Dundee, for which an act of Parliament, the Dundee Water Act 1837 (7 Will. 4 & 1 Vict. c cxxvi), was obtained, but no work was undertaken at the time. Construction of the dam for the Threipmuir Reservoir may have been completed before Jardine retired, but the Harlaw dam was definitely Leslie's work. The main outlet for the reservoir was through a cast iron pipe sitting on the foundations for the dam. A masonry tower was built at the inner end of the pipeline, near the upstream toe of the dam, and a rod passing up the tower enabled the sluice to be controlled. To enable the outlet valve to be inspected or maintained, a sluice made of oak could be lowered in guides, cutting off the incoming water and allowing the pipeline to drain. A second similar structure allowed water to be taken from about 40 feet (12 m) above the bottom of the reservoir. When the dam was nearly completed, there was evidence of slippage on the upstream face, which displaced the tower slightly. Leslie put this down to the dam being built too quickly, with insufficient attention being paid to consolidating the hard boulder clay from which much of the dam was constructed, and all his subsequent dams were constructed in layers less than 1 foot (300 mm) thick, to mitigate such problems. Despite the movement of the tower, no remedial work was undertaken, and it has remained standing ever since. Leslie completed the work specified by the Edinburgh Water Company Act 1843 in 1848.

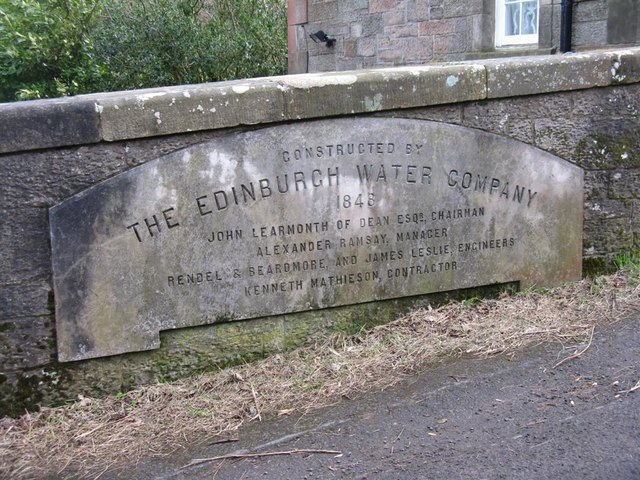
A plaque to celebrate the construction of Torduff Reservoir in 1848

Edinburgh Water Company's Act 1847
- Act of Parliament
- Parliament of the United Kingdom
- Long title: An Act for better supplying with Water the City of Edinburgh and Places adjacent.
- Citation: 10 & 11 Vict. c. ccii

Dates
- Royal assent: 9 July 1847

Other legislation
- Repealed by: Edinburgh Corporation Order Confirmation Act 1958

Status: Repealed

Text of statute as originally enacted

Edinburgh Water Company's Act 1853
- Act of Parliament
- Parliament of the United Kingdom
- Long title: An Act to enable the Edinburgh Water Company to raise a further Sum of Money; and for other Purposes.
- Citation: 16 & 17 Vict. c. xlix

Dates
- Royal assent: 14 June 1853

Other legislation
- Repealed by: Edinburgh Corporation Water Order Confirmation Act 1924

Text of statute as originally enacted

Before the two reservoirs had been completed, Leslie could see that they would still not be sufficient to provide the water that Edinburgh needed, and so the company applied for the Edinburgh Water Company's Act 1847 (10 & 11 Vict. c. ccii). This made provision for the construction of three more reservoirs, at Clubbiedean, Torduff and Bonaly on the northern parts of the Pentland Hills, while on the southern side of the hills they could raise the dam at Glencorse Reservoir, to increase the amount of water impounded, and build a reservoir at Loganlea, above that at Glencorse. The three northern reservoirs were designed to store up spring water, so that supplies to the city of Edinburgh could be maintained even if there were future droughts. The Loganlea Reservoir and the improvements to Glencorse were to ensure that the statutory compensation water could always be supplied for the mills on the River Esk, while allowing the water company to always keep the pipeline from Crawley Springs full. The 1847 act was innovative, in that it contained a clause requiring the company to provide a constant water supply to homes, a concept that had been championed by the sanitary reformer Edwin Chadwick.

Two other engineers, James Rendel and Nathaniel Beardmore worked on the proposals, and the setting out of the works once the act was obtained, but it was Leslie who supervised the construction. The northern reservoirs were constructed with earth dams, with a 3-to-1 slope on the upstream side of the central clay puddle wall, and a 2.5 to 1 slope on the downstream side. The outlet arrangements for Torduff and Loganlea were similar to those at Harlaw, with two outlets, although the bottom outlets fed into tunnels cut through solid rock, but at Clubbiedean, the outlet was a single cast iron pipe buried beneath the dam. Leslie's regime of compacting thin layers worked well, and it was not until the 1970s that some remedial work was required at Clubbiedean to grout the embankment and foundations, as the underlying limestone had gradually dissolved, creating some leakage through the dam. Remedial work was also required at Torduff after some leakage was discovered in the 1980s.

Edinburgh Water Company's Act 1856
- Act of Parliament
- Parliament of the United Kingdom
- Long title: An Act for better supplying with Water the City of Edinburgh and Town and Port of Leith and Places adjacent.
- Citation: 19 & 20 Vict. c. xci

Dates
- Royal assent: 14 July 1856

Other legislation
- Repealed by: Edinburgh Corporation Order Confirmation Act 1958

Status: Repealed

Text of statute as originally enacted

Edinburgh Water Company's Amendment Act 1863
- Act of Parliament
- Parliament of the United Kingdom
- Long title: An Act to authorize the Edinburgh Water Company to introduce an additional Supply of Water to the City of Edinburgh and Town and Port of Leith and Places adjacent; and for other Purposes.
- Citation: 26 & 27 Vict. c. clxxxvii

Dates
- Royal assent: 21 July 1863

Other legislation
- Repealed by: Edinburgh Corporation Order Confirmation Act 1958

Status: Repealed

Text of statute as originally enacted

The volume of water needed to supply the residents of Edinburgh continued to increase, and so the Edinburgh Water Company's Act 1856 (19 & 20 Vict. c. xci) was obtained, allowing the company to take water from the Colzium springs. To maintain flows in the Water of Leith, a compensation reservoir was required at Harperrig. Leslie refined his designs for the outlets of the reservoir, with both the upper and lower outlets feeding into a culvert which ran beneath the bottom of the dam, and had been used to channel the river while the dam was being constructed. This project was completed in 1859, but was still not sufficient, so the Edinburgh Water Company's Amendment Act 1863 (26 & 27 Vict. c. clxxxvii) was obtained to enable exploitation of the Crosswood springs, with a compensation reservoir at Crosswood to feed the Crosswood Burn. The dam that Leslie designed was similar to that at Harperrig, and the work was completed in 1868. Leslie had improved his designs in other respects, and after the catastrophic failure of the Bilberry Dam in 1852, had insisted that dams should be built up in layers not more than 6 inches (15 cm) thick, to ensure adequate consolidation. He also specified that where excavated material was used to build the dams, clay and earth should be used against the central puddle wall, particularly on the upstream side, and that stones, gravel and sandy material should only be used for the slopes, and restricted to the downstream side if possible. These latter requirements were probably influenced by the findings of the inquest into the Bilberry disaster, but Leslie's insights meant that the Harperrig and Crosswood dams were among the best-designed earth dams at the time of their construction. Although less details are available, Leslie was also responsible for construction of water mains and treatment works.

=== Takeover ===
Edinburgh and District Waterworks Act 1869
- Act of Parliament
- Parliament of the United Kingdom
- Long title: An Act to create and incorporate a Public Trust for supplying Water to the city of Edinburgh, town and port of Leith, town of Portobello, and districts and places adjacent; to transfer to the Trust the undertaking and powers of the Edinburgh Water Company; and for other purposes.
- Citation: 32 & 33 Vict. c. cxliv

Dates
- Royal assent: 26 July 1869

Other legislation
- Repealed by: Edinburgh Corporation Order Confirmation Act 1958

Status: Repealed

Text of statute as originally enacted

Edinburgh and District Waterworks (Additional Supply) Act 1874
- Act of Parliament
- Parliament of the United Kingdom
- Long title: An Act to provide an additional supply of Water for the city of Edinburgh, the town and port of Leith, and town of Portobello, and districts and places adjacent, from Moorfoot, including the River South Esk and Tweeddale Bum and Portmore Loch, and by additional Storage in Glencorse Valley; to make further Regulations for prevention of Waste; to further suspend the period for constant Service; and for other purposes.
- Citation: 37 & 38 Vict. c. clvi

Dates
- Royal assent: 30 July 1874

Other legislation
- Repealed by: Edinburgh Corporation Order Confirmation Act 1958

Status: Repealed

Text of statute as originally enacted

Edinburgh and District Waterworks Act 1876
- Act of Parliament
- Parliament of the United Kingdom
- Long title: An Act to enable the Edinburgh and District Water Trustees to abandon their authorised Edgelaw Reservoir, and to construct the same on another Site; and also to construct a Reservoir at Rosebery, and other Works, and to make further provision for the supply of Water to their District and otherwise, and for other purposes.
- Citation: 39 & 40 Vict. c. xxxiii

Other legislation
- Repealed by: Edinburgh Corporation Order Confirmation Act 1958

Status: Repealed

Text of statute as originally enacted

Edinburgh and District Waterworks Act 1877
- Act of Parliament
- Parliament of the United Kingdom
- Long title: An Act to enable the Edinburgh and District Water Trustees to abandon their authorised Alnwick Hill Service Reservoir, and to construct the same on another site, with relative works, and to divert certain conduits; and for other purposes.
- Citation: 40 & 41 Vict. c. xxvi

Dates
- Royal assent: 11 June 1877

Other legislation
- Repealed by: Edinburgh Corporation Order Confirmation Act 1958

Status: Repealed

Text of statute as originally enacted

Edinburgh and District Waterworks Act 1880
- Act of Parliament
- Parliament of the United Kingdom
- Long title: An Act to enable the Edinburgh and District Water Trustees to borrow additional sums of money; and for other purposes.
- Citation: 43 & 44 Vict. c. i

Dates
- Royal assent: 14 June 1880

Other legislation
- Repealed by: Edinburgh Corporation Water Order Confirmation Act 1924

Status: Repealed

Text of statute as originally enacted

Edinburgh and District Waterworks Act 1889
- Act of Parliament
- Parliament of the United Kingdom
- Long title: An Act to enable the Edinburgh and District Water Trustees to borrow additional sums of money; and for other purposes.
- Citation: 52 & 53 Vict. c. xi

Dates
- Royal assent: 31 May 1889

Text of statute as originally enacted

By 1868, the Pentland Hills were yielding some 6.3 million imperial gallons (29 Ml) of water per day, of which three-quarters comprised spring water from the north side of the hills, with the rest coming from the south side. The Crosswood scheme was the last to exploit water from the hills. Serious debate took place, with the corporations of Edinburgh, Leith and Portobello complaining that the existing water company was not bold enough in their actions, as each new scheme seemed to deliver less water than was needed. They looked for where additional supplies could be obtained, and obtained the Edinburgh and District Waterworks Act 1869 (32 & 33 Vict. c. cxliv) to create the Edinburgh and District Water Trust. This would include representatives from the three corporations, and its powers included taking over the Edinburgh Water Company, which it did on 15 May 1870. Leslie was retained as a consulting engineer, but they also appointed James W. Stewart to manage the immediate issues. In this he was assisted by John Frederick Bateman.

Prior to the takeover, Leslie had suggested a scheme to exploit the waters of the Moorfoot Hills in 1866 as a way to obtain extra supplies for the people of Edinburgh, Leith and Portobello. The three burghs had appointed Stewart to look at alternative supplies, and he and Bateman had proposed obtaining water from St Mary's Loch, some 33 miles (53 km) to the south of Edinburgh. Bateman recognised that this would be more expensive than the Moorfoot Hills scheme, but it had the potential to yield three times as much water in the longer term, and so ultimately would prove to be cheaper. This scheme had been included in the bill for the 1870 act, but had been rejected by the House of Lords because of a minor technical error. After the takeover had occurred, the burghs put the scheme before Parliament again, but local opposition was stirred up, particularly about the alleged problems of water fleas when using lake water, and they managed to persuade the House of Lords to reject the scheme for a second time. There were local elections in 1872, which resulted in the personnel of the trust changing, and Leslie effectively regained control as engineer. He advised the trust to proceed with the Moorfoot Hills scheme, using the catchment of the River South Esk to supply drinking water and the Fullerton Burn to supply compensation water.

The Edgelaw Reservoir on the Fullerton Burn had a valve well located near to the puddle corewall, rather than Leslie's previous siting of the well at the toe of the upstream embankment. This was a retrograde step, but may have been influenced by Thomas Hawksley, who had been asked by the trust to assist Leslie in finding a suitable site. Trial boring for the Gladhouse Reservoir was thorough, and paid dividends when what was initially thought to be solid rock turned out to be a large boulder. No suitable bedrock could be found below it, and the dam was eventually sited 1 mile (1.6 km) further downstream. The scheme was completed in 1880, and yielded 8.69 million imperial gallons (39.5 Ml) per day, very similar to the amount that Bateman had suggested it would yield when arguing against it. Leslie later built Rosebery Reservoir, also on the South Esk about 1 mile (1.6 km) below Gladhouse Reservoir, which was completed in 1885.

James Leslie took his son Alexander into partnership in 1871, becoming J & A Leslie, and his son-in-law Robert Reid joined about two years later, when the enterprise became J & A Leslie and Reid. Leslie designed the Alnwickhill water treatment works, although the contractors were James Young & Son. It consisted on reservoir holding 15 million imperial gallons (68 Ml) of raw water and two slow sand filter settling tanks. Work started on the first phase in 1875, and the works opened in 1879, with a second phase being completed in 1888. The two outlet houses were built in a classical Roman style. Alexander Leslie collected dozens of photographs, showing the construction of some of the later projects, including the dams and filtration plants, workmen, architects and engineers, which he mounted in a book. The book was lost from view, but was found in the archives of the Edinburgh Library, and in 2014 the images were compiled to form an online exhibition.

=== Development ===
Edinburgh and District Waterworks (Additional Supply) Act 1895
- Act of Parliament
- Parliament of the United Kingdom
- Long title: An Act to provide an additional supply of Water to the City of Edinburgh Town and Port of Leith and Town of Portobello and districts and places adjacent to confer further powers on the Edinburgh and District Water Trustees and for other purposes.
- Citation: 58 & 59 Vict. c. xxvii

Dates
- Royal assent: 30 May 1895

Other legislation
- Repealed by: Edinburgh Corporation Order Confirmation Act 1958

Status: Repealed

Text of statute as originally enacted

Edinburgh and District Waterworks Act 1898
- Act of Parliament
- Parliament of the United Kingdom
- Long title: An Act to authorise the Edinburgh and District Water Trustees to construct additional works to make deviations of authorised works and for other purposes.
- Citation: 61 & 62 Vict. c. xxiv

Dates
- Royal assent: 23 May 1898

Other legislation
- Repealed by: Edinburgh Corporation Order Confirmation Act 1958

Status: Repealed

Text of statute as originally enacted

The next development was to exploit the headwaters of the River Tweed. Talla Reservoir was part of the New Water Supply project adopted by the Edinburgh and District Water Trust on 11 October 1894, and authorised by the Edinburgh and District Waterworks (Additional Supply) Act 1895 (58 & 59 Vict. c. xxvii) on 30 May 1895. The reservoir is about 1 mile (1.6 km) from the village of Tweedsmuir, and lies in the valley of the Talla Water. The scheme also included a service reservoir and filter, main and branch aqueducts to carry the water towards Edinburgh, and a 10-mile (16 km) railway, known as the Talla Railway was built from the Peebles to Symington branch of the Caledonian Railway to the construction site, for the transport of materials. The dam was formally opened on 20 May 1905, after which the Talla Water was diverted into it and it began to fill. The railway was sold off afterwards, and had been lifted by 1912. The Talla Aqueduct carries water 35 miles (56 km) from the reservoir to Alnwickhill Filters. There are 21 tunnels with a total length of 9 miles (14 km), ranging in length from 133 yards (122 m) to 1.33 miles (2.14 km). 12 miles (19 km) were built by cut-and-cover methods, and the remainder if formed of bridges and syphons. The syphons consist of cast iron pipes which cross valleys, and each is fitted with an automatic valve at the upstream end, which is designed to close if a burst occurs. The aqueduct falls at a gradient of 1 in 4000.

J & A Leslie and Reid were the engineers for the water treatment works at Fairmilehead, completed in 1910, which consisted of a filter house, containing 12 pressure filters capable of treating 4 million imperial gallons (18 Ml) or water per day, and the Hillend pump house. The buildings are of an Edwardian Baroque style, rather than the classical Roman style that Leslie had used on earlier works.

The undertaking of the Edinburgh and District Water Trustees was transferred to Edinburgh Corporation by the Edinburgh Boundaries Extension and Tramways Act 1920 (10 & 11 Geo. 5. c. lxxxvii).

Near to Talla Reservoir is the Fruid Reservoir, built to impound the waters of the next upstream tributary of the Tweed, the Fruid Water. The top water level is 1,024 feet (312 m) above sea level, and it covers an area of 344 acres (139 ha). Construction started in 1967, and surplus water is used to top up Talla Reservoir. In 2014, a survey of the Talla aqueduct, which now carries water from Fruid and Talla to a new water treatments works at Glencorse, was undertaken, after which 1,150 feet (350 m) of the tunnels were refurbished. In addition, new valves were fitted to the valve chambers. Jacobs were the consulting engineers for the £2.6 million project, and the contractor was George Leslie.

Bateman's scheme to abstract water from St Mary's Loch was revisited in the 1980s, when the Megget Reservoir was completed in 1983. It dams the Megget River, which flows into the loch, and impounds water from around half of the St Mary's Loch catchment. Aqueducts and pipelines convey the water to Glencorse Reservoir, dating from 1822, to Gladhouse Reservoir, dating from 1879, and to Rosebery Treatment Works, which was built in 1953. A second phase involved pumping water from St Mary's Lock into the Megget Reservoir, and controlling the outflow from the loch by the use of sluices.

By 2008, there were 13 service reservoirs supplying Edinburgh, at Fairmilehead, Alnwickhill, Marchbank, Firrhill, Humbie, Hillend, Torduff, Clermiston, Harlaw, Kinleith, Langloan, Dunsapie, and Craig Park, which were supplied from four water treatment works, at Rosebery, Fairmilehead, Alnwickhill and Marchbank. In 2006, Scottish Water considered ways to improve the city's water supply, and particularly the Alnwickhill works, dating from 1885, and that at Fairmilehead, dating from 1909. The solution adopted was to build a new treatment works at Glencorse, to replace both of them. One of the factors affecting the choice of site was that raw water could reach it from the main reservoirs at Talla, Fruid and Megget by gravity, using the existing Victorian pipeline, and it was at a sufficient elevation that the treated water could reach Edinburgh by gravity, removing the need for pumping, with its associated costs. The incoming raw water is used to power a Gilkes water turbine, which generates 230 kW, around one-third of the power requirements of the plant. The new works can deliver 38 million imperial gallons (170 Ml) per day, and the total cost, which included the construction of over 4.5 miles (7 km) of twin 4-foot (1.2 m) diameter pipeline to link the works to the existing distribution network at Fairmilehead and Alnwickhill, was £130 million. The work was completed in March 2012, and the plant was officially opened in June 2012.

Rosebery Water Treatment Works was originally built in the 1940s, close to Rosebury Reservoir, and was extended in 1965 and 1989. In 2006 a major upgrade was completed, to increase its output from 40 Ml per day to 60 Ml per day, by replacing the existing slow sand filters and bell pressure filters, which had reached the end of their lives, by dissolved air flotation rapid gravity filters. The works were phased to ensure that the existing throughput could be maintained during the new construction, and the £8.6-million project took two and a half years to complete from a start date in January 2004. The Marchbank Water Treatment Works was also upgraded with new dissolved air flotation filters, in a £10-million project completed in 2009, which enabled it to deliver 62 Ml of water per day to Edinburgh consumers.

=== Sewerage ===
When there was no effective way of disposing of human waste, those who lived on the upper storeys of Edinburgh's tenement blocks could empty pails and chamber pots into the street below. They were required to shout "Gardez l'eau!", meaning "watch the water", which became corrupted to "gardyloo". The hazards to pedestrians were reduced a little by the passing of the 'Nastiness Act' in 1749, an act of the Edinburgh City Council, which restricted such activity to the hours between 10 pm and 7 am.

Edinburgh and Leith Sewerage Act 1864
- Act of Parliament
- Parliament of the United Kingdom
- Long title: An Act for the Purification of the Water of Leith, by Interception and Conveyance into the Sea of the Sewage falling into the same, and otherwise; and for other Purposes.
- Citation: 27 & 28 Vict. c. cliii

Dates
- Royal assent: 30 June 1864

Other legislation
- Repealed by: Water of Leith Purification and Sewerage Act 1889

Status: Repealed

Text of statute as originally enacted

Water of Leith Purification and Sewerage Act 1889
- Act of Parliament
- Parliament of the United Kingdom
- Long title: An Act to provide for the Purification of the Water of Leith, and the tributaries thereof, in the county of Midlothian, and the construction of Works in connexion therewith; and for the constitution and incorporation of Commissioners; and for other purposes.
- Citation: 52 & 53 Vict. c. cvi

Dates
- Royal assent: 26 July 1889

Other legislation
- Repealed by: Edinburgh Corporation Order Confirmation Act 1964

Status: Repealed

Text of statute as originally enacted

Water of Leith Purification and Sewerage (Additional Powers) Act 1893
- Act of Parliament
- Parliament of the United Kingdom
- Long title: An Act to enable the Water of Leith Purification and Sewerage Commissioners to construct additional works and to borrow additional Money and for other purposes.
- Citation: 56 & 57 Vict. c. xvii

Dates
- Royal assent: 29 April 1893

Text of statute as originally enacted

Water of Leith Purification and Sewerage Order Confirmation Act 1908
- Act of Parliament
- Parliament of the United Kingdom
- Long title: An Act to confirm a Provisional Order under the Private Legislation Procedure (Scotland) Act 1899 relating to Water of Leith Purification and Sewerage.
- Citation: 8 Edw. 7. c. clxiii

Dates
- Royal assent: 21 December 1908

Other legislation
- Repealed by: Edinburgh Corporation Order Confirmation Act 1964
- Relates to: Private Legislation Procedure (Scotland) Act 1899

Status: Repealed

Edinburgh experienced rapid growth in the second half of the 19th century, with the population nearly doubling between 1851 and 1901, from 160,511 to 316,837. The sewerage system was inadequate, and the Water of Leith, the main river through the city, became polluted. The Edinburgh and Leith Sewerage Act 1864 (27 & 28 Vict. c. cliii) was obtained, to create the Water of Leith Sewerage Commissioners and allow the construction of a sewer to intercept the drains and sewers that discharged into the Water of Leith, which would convey the sewage to the sea. The civil engineer Napier Bell, who had spent his early years in Central America with his father James Stanislaus Bell and returned to Scotland in 1857, worked on the Edinburgh sewerage works, but it is unclear in what capacity. The sewer used brickwork sealed with Portland cement and caulked with rope, and was of an egg-shaped section, as pioneered by John Roe, which made them self-cleaning. Ventilators were constructed every 100 yards (90 m) or so, which were covered with metal gratings where the sewer ran beneath streets, and disguised by bushes where it ran through parks. This removed much of the threat of water-borne diseases such as cholera from the poorer areas of Edinburgh, and in 1889, the Water of Leith Purification and Sewerage Commissioners were established by the Water of Leith Purification and Sewerage Act 1889 (52 & 53 Vict. c. cvi) and a second, deeper, interceptor sewer was constructed. It reached as far as Balerno, some 8 miles (13 km) to the south-west of the city centre, and resulted in the Water of Leith becoming relatively unpolluted again.

The undertaking of the Water of Leith Purification and Sewerage Commissioners was transferred to Edinburgh Corporation by the Edinburgh Boundaries Extension and Tramways Act 1920 (10 & 11 Geo. 5. c. lxxxvii).

The network of sewers continued to expand until 1960, but there was never any attempt made to treat it before it poured into the sea. Edinburgh Corporation carried out a feasibility study in 1966, as to how this situation could be improved, and decided to build a new sewage treatment plant on reclaimed land near Leith. The Local Government (Scotland) Act 1973 created new regional councils, resulting in Lothian Regional Council taking over the responsibility for Edinburgh's sewerage and sewage treatment, and it was they who completed the new works, which opened in 1978, having been partially funded by a European Investment Bank preferential loan.

The works initially performed primary treatment only, to remove solids, and the remaining liquid was discharged into the sea through a 1.75-mile (2.8 km) pipeline. After the solids had been treated, they were loaded onto a sludge disposal ship, the MV Gardyloo, and dumped at sea. This practice ceased at the end of 1998, when dumping was banned by the EU Urban Waste Water Treatment Directive, and the plant was extended to perform secondary treatment on the sewage, after which it went to a landfill site. In 1999, the running of the plant was taken over from the East of Scotland Water Board by Stirling Water and Veolia, under a private finance initiative. There are six sludge digesters on the site, which occupies 20 acres (8.1 ha), and they produce enough gas to generate 2.3 MW of electricity. It is expected that the site will become self-sufficient for energy within a few years. As part of the Seafield works, another interceptor sewer was constructed, some 11 miles (17.7 km) long and up to 10 feet (3 m) in diameter. Due to the wide variety of ground conditions, some of it was tunnelled, some constructed by cut-and-cover, and in places, the ground had to be frozen before excavation could proceed. In addition to the main treatment works at Seafield, there are smaller works at Newbridge, South Queensferry and Dalmeny.

== Legacy ==
Most of the reservoirs built in the 19th century to supply Edinburgh with water have lasted well. Following the failure of the Dale Dyke Dam in Sheffield in 1864, which resulted in nearly 250 deaths, the jury at the inquest stated that "the Legislature ought to take such action as will result in a government inspection of all works of this character, and that such inspection should be frequent, sufficient and regular." It was not until 66 years later that the Reservoirs (Safety Provisions) Act 1930 was passed. As a result of that act, standards have been developed, and the size of the spillways on all of the dams have had to be increased, although this is not a feature that is unique to Edinburgh's reservoirs, but has affected most earth dams built in the 19th century. Additionally, the foundations and embankment at Clubbiedean were grouted in the 1970s, and some remedial work to deal with leakage was carried out at Torduff in the 1980s.

In 1974 responsibility for supplying water to Edinburgh, and ownership of the reservoirs passed to Lothian Regional Council. It subsequently passed to the East of Scotland Water Authority in 1996, and in 2002 was transferred to the newly-formed Scottish Water. In 2005, Edinburgh Council agreed to buy Harperrig, Harlaw and Threipmuir reservoirs from Scottish Water, who no longer required them for water supply. They now form a major part of the flood defences for the Water of Leith, allowing water levels to be lowered to give additional storage in times of high rainfall. The three reservoirs were valued at £135,000, but were transferred to the council for a nominal £1.

== Bibliography ==
- Binnie, G M (1981). Early Victorian Water Engineers. Thomas Telford. ISBN 978-0-7277-0128-2.
- Cross-Rudkin, Peter; Chrimes, Mike (2008). A Biographical Dictionary of Civil Engineers in Great Britain and Ireland: Vol 2: 1830 to 1890. Thomas Telford. ISBN 978-0-7277-3504-1.
- Douglas, Scott (30 December 2008). "Raising a glass to Scottish Water's investment across Edinburgh and Lothian". Holyrood Partnership. Archived from the original on 13 May 2021.
- Lobina, Emanuele; Terhorst, Philipp (29 January 2005). D19: WaterTime case study - Edinburgh, UK. Watertime EU Research Project. Archived from the original on 20 August 2018.
- Skempton, Sir Alec; et al. (2002). A Biographical Dictionary of Civil Engineers in Great Britain and Ireland: Vol 1: 1500 to 1830. Thomas Telford. ISBN 978-0-7277-2939-2.
- SoE (2009). "State of the Environment Audit - Water Supply" (PDF). City of Edinburgh Council. Archived from the original (PDF) on 20 August 2018.
- STV (19 April 2018). "Scotland's largest sewage works celebrates 40 years". STV News. Archived from the original on 5 April 2022.
- WPO (2012). "Glencorse WTW" (PDF). Water Projects Online. Archived from the original (PDF) on 1 August 2016.
