= Crook Inn =

Coordinates: 55.5236°N 3.4094°W

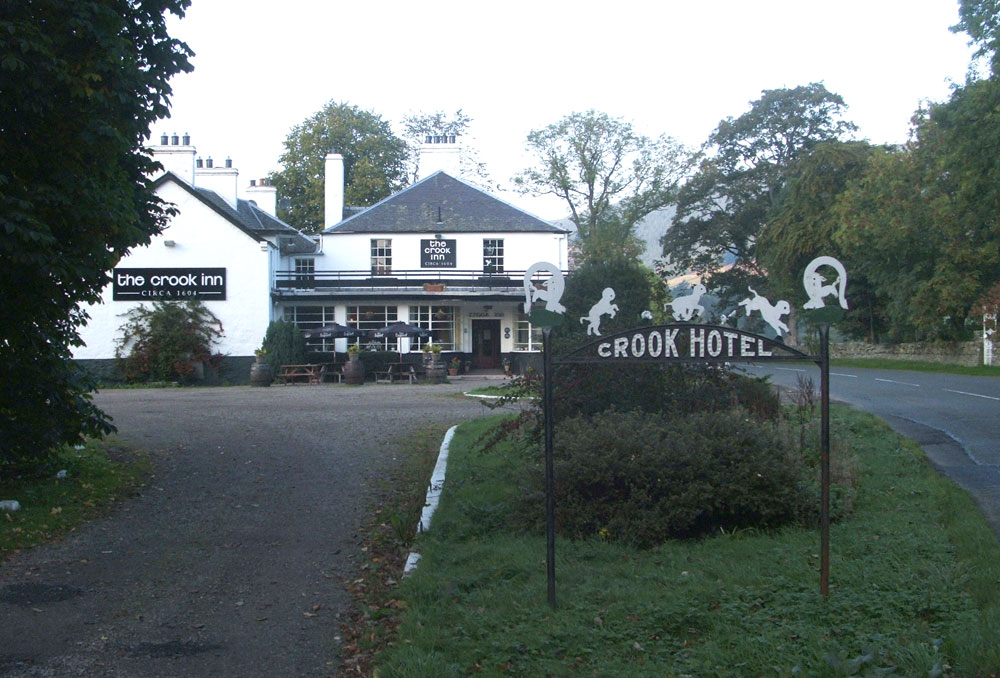
The Crook Inn, 2006

The Crook Inn is an inn in the Scottish Borders, near the village of Tweedsmuir on the A701 road between Broughton and Moffat. It is one of many claimants to be the oldest inn in Scotland. It was licensed in 1604. Robert Burns wrote "Willie Wastle's Wife" there. It has served as a coaching inn, a Post Office and source of employment. In the early 20th century a halt was built on the Talla Railway to serve it. The inn attracted much passing trade from the labourers who were building the Talla Reservoir, which the railway was built to serve.

The hotel was refurbished in 1936 in the then-current Art Deco style, and retains many of the features installed at that time. It has also, over the years, become a place of pilgrimage for members of the Porteous family, visiting the site of nearby Hawkshaw, their former ancestral home on the hills above Tweeddale and the Fruid Reservoir. A reunion of Porteous family members was traditionally held at the inn every five years, attracting visitors from all over the world.

The proposals to convert the historic inn into apartments met with much local opposition and the plans were rejected by the councillors of Tweeddale West in March 2008. Following refusal the present owner lodged an appeal with the Department for Planning and Environmental Appeals (DPEA), a department of the Scottish Government.

On 2 February 2009, following an appeal hearing on 18 November 2008, a decision notice was issued by the DPEA which finally dismissed the appeal. This meant that planning permission was not granted for the change of use of the historic Crook Inn to residential accommodation, giving scope for the inn to reopen once again if it could be purchased.

In January 2013, after a lengthy campaign by the Tweedsmuir community to secure ownership of the Crook Inn in order to reinvigorate it, the Tweedsmuir Community Company raised the asking price of £160,000 and bought the property. The Tweedsmuir Community Company obtained a Development Grant from Big Lottery in 2014 to redesign and renovate the historic Crook Inn, with designs undertaken by WTArchitecture, Edinburgh. The plans obtained planning permission in 2015. The rest of the land at the site was purchased in 2015 with grants from the Scottish Land Fund, SSE Clyde Border and the Infinis Glenkerie Community Funds. Grants are being sought to create a multi-faceted Crook Inn Community Hub to serve the Upper Tweed community and tourism.

Since then nothing has happened and the building continues to deteriorate. It is listed on the Buildings at Risk Register for Scotland.

== See also ==
- Porteous family
