= Megget Reservoir =

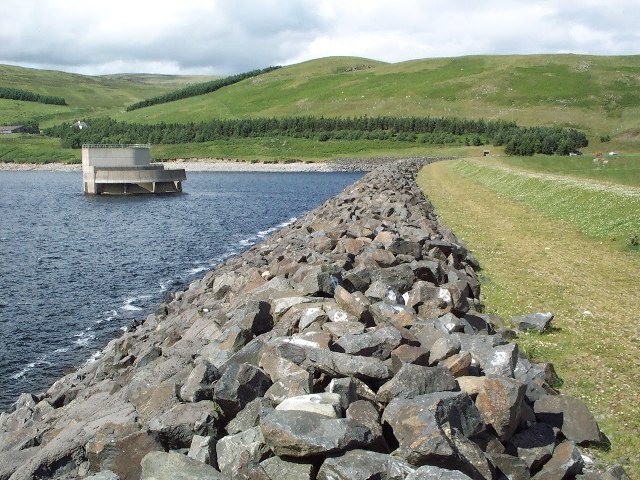
- Megget Reservoir

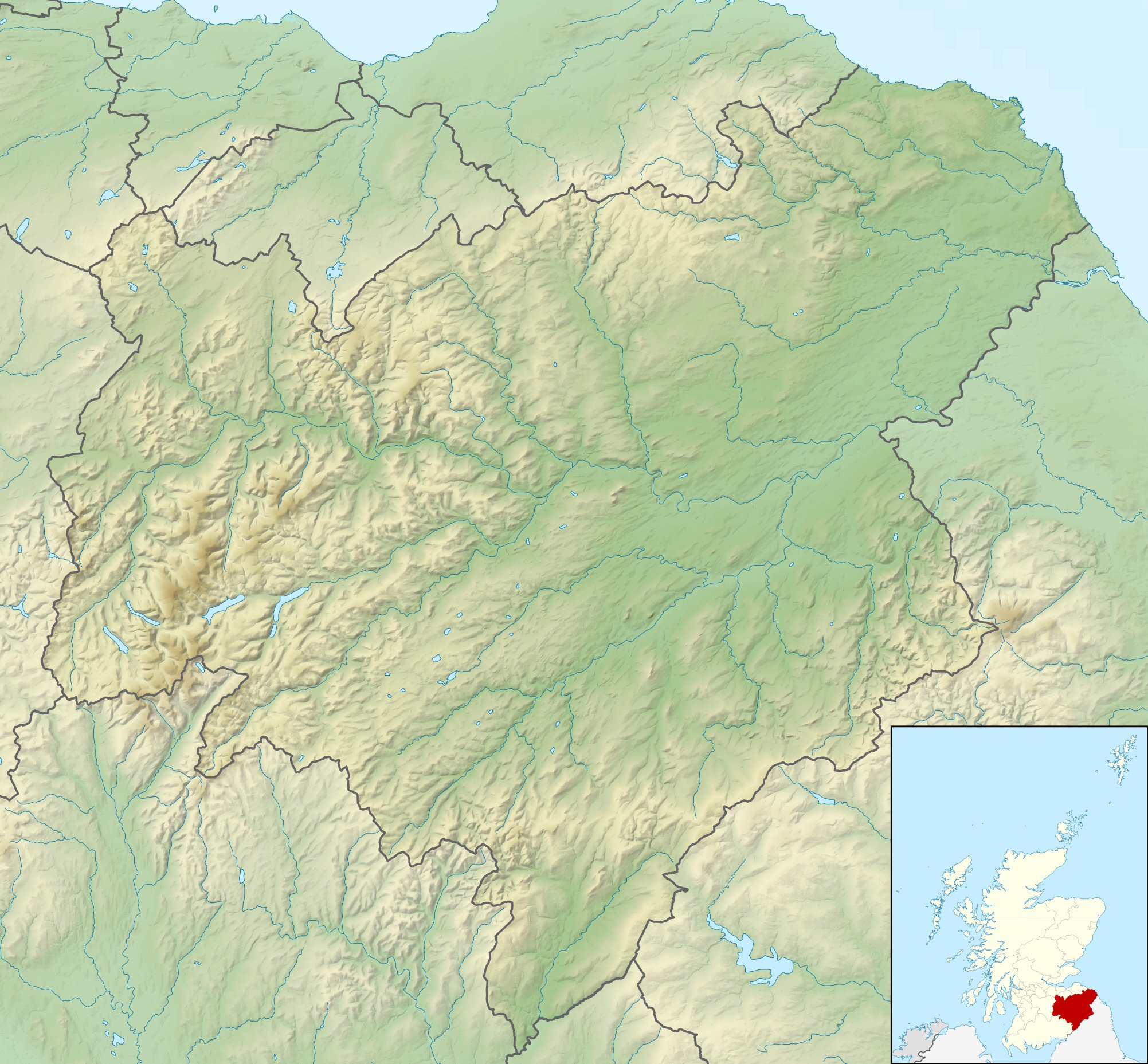
- Location within Scottish Borders
- Location: Scottish Borders
- Coordinates: 55°29′10″N 3°16′45″W
- Type: reservoir
- Basin countries: United Kingdom
- Surface area: 259 ha (640 acres)
- Surface elevation: 334 m (1,096 ft)

Megget Reservoir is an impounding reservoir in the Megget valley in Ettrick Forest, in the Scottish Borders. The 259 hectares (640 acres) reservoir is held back by the largest earth dam in Scotland. The reservoir collects water from the Tweedsmuir Hills, which is then conveyed 28 miles (45 km) via underground pipelines and tunnels to Edinburgh. The pipelines are routed through the Manor Valley and the Meldon Hills, to Gladhouse Reservoir and Glencorse Reservoir in the Pentland Hills. These two reservoirs store the water until such times as it is required. Excess water which overflows from the reservoir is returned to the Megget Water, and hence into St. Mary's Loch.

== History ==
The Megget Reservoir Scheme was first seriously considered in 1963. In 1974, the then water authority Lothian Regional Council applied for and received authority from the Secretary of State to proceed. Design was carried out by chartered civil engineers Robert H Cuthbertson & Partners on behalf of the water authority, and construction started in 1976. The dam which holds the reservoir is concrete with an asphalt impermeable core. The reservoir was officially opened on 30 September 1983. It has a capacity of 61,400,000 cubic metres (2.17×10^{9} cu ft), and a maximum water level of 334 metres (1,096 ft) above Ordnance Datum. The embankment is 56 metres (184 ft) high and its crest is 568 metres (1,864 ft) long.

In 1983, Lothian Regional Council commissioned a short film - "A Different Valley" - on the construction of the dam and associated works. A copy of this is held by the National Library of Scotland and can be viewed online.

== Cramalt Tower ==
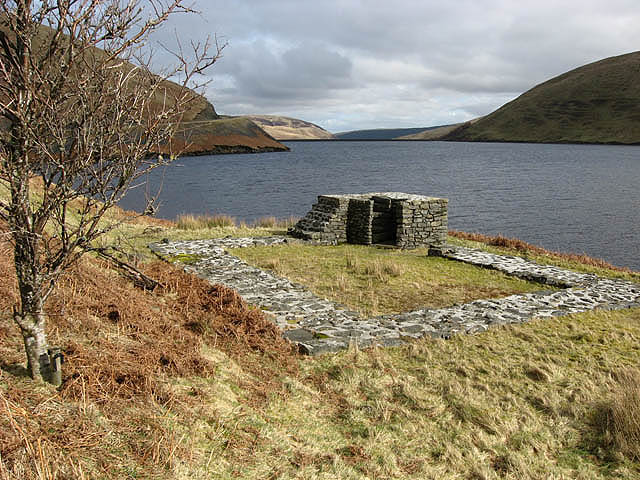
Foundations of Cramalt Tower

The site of Cramalt or Cramald tower or castle was covered by the water of the reservoir. The excavated foundations have been reconstructed near the shoreline of the reservoir.

Cramalt Tower was used by James V when he came to hunt deer in the area in September 1529. In June 1532 he brought a relatively small company of 300 followers. His masons worked on the building in 1533 and in 1534 a baker called Thomas Lyon constructed an oven. There were two towers. When James V came to hunt in September 1538 his servant John Tennent brought bedding from Linlithgow Palace and Malcolm Gourlay brought tents stored at Holyrood Palace for his company. His men were equipped with staffs and halberds. The castle belonged to Lord Hay of Yester.

A later 16th-century chronicle by Robert Lindsay of Pitscottie describes James V hunting at Meggetland in June 1528 (but really July 1530) with 12,000 courtiers and followers. After hunting in the region he caught the outlaw Johnnie Armstrong. The royal itinerary and the visit to Cramalt was recorded in the king's household book. James V visited again in September 1538, but his wife Mary of Guise decided to stay at Linlithgow Palace.

Mary, Queen of Scots and Lord Darnley stayed for few days in August 1566 while hunting in Meggetland. The Earls of Bothwell, Murray, and Mar accompanied them. While Mary was at the castle she wrote invitations to the baptism of Prince James to be held at Stirling Castle. They found little sport, and Mary issued a proclamation from Rodono that no one should shoot deer with handguns or bows.

== See also ==
- Talla Reservoir
- Baddinsgill Reservoir
- Fruid Reservoir
- Westwater Reservoir
- List of reservoirs and dams in the United Kingdom
