= Menzion =

Village in Scottish Borders, Scotland, UK

Coordinates: 55.497°N 3.439°W

Nether Menzion farm house

Menzion, sometimes Minzion is a small settlement in southern Scotland near Tweedsmuir in the Scottish Borders, in the valley of the River Tweed.

== Topography ==
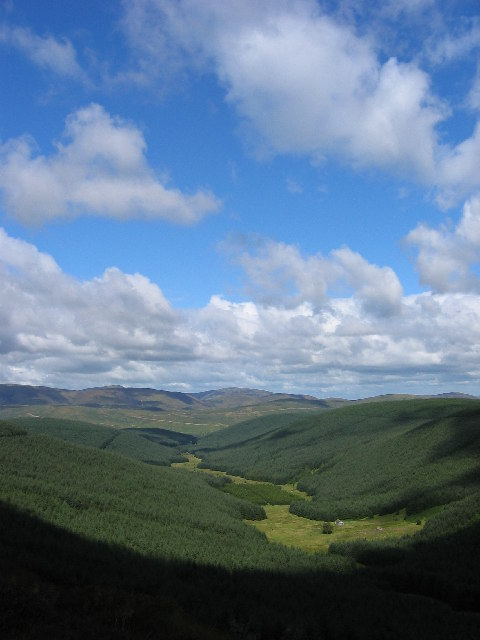
Over Menzion with the ruined shepherd's cottage at low centre right in the valley of the Menzion Burn

Menzion lies along the Menzion burn, being separated into Nether Menzion and Over Menzion. Nether Menzion lies at the foot of the burn near the Fruid road. The burn is surrounded on both sides by commercial forestry which is set back to reduce the immediate impact of the acidic run-off. Over Menzion, which was formerly a shepherd's abode, is now abandoned.

== Ancient stones ==
Menzion displays evidence of very early habitation with three ancient stones standing on a minor road leading to Fruid Reservoir, just north of the village of Tweedsmuir. Of these, the main stone is known as "The Giant's Stone" which is about 1.60 m high. The two other stones nearby were not mentioned in the Ordnance Survey map of 1859, where the Giant's Stone is described as "Remains of Druidical Temple". The parish records of 1833 state that there were other stones but that these were carried away and put to other uses.

Menzion was part of the barony of Oliver Castle and originally belonged to Clan Fraser. After Sir Simon Fraser died it was divided between his two daughters Joanna and Mary. Joanna married Sir Patrick Fleming and Over Menzion became the property of the Flemings and Mary married Sir Gilbert Hay and Nether Menzion became the property of the Hays. The Fleming family held the lands until 1636, when John (Fleming), second Earl of Wigtown, conveyed Over Menzion to Sir David Murray of Stanhope who obtained a Crown charter on 17 March 1645 incorporating the lands into the barony of Stanhope-Murray.

It was in around 1645 that a vagrant called Marion Chisholm came from Edinburgh while the Plague was raging there carrying a bundle of clothing with the disease in it. The occupants of Nether Menzion and two other farms at Fruid, and Glencotho became infected. Those who escaped the pestilence pulled down the roofs and walls of their houses onto the bodies of those who had died. Marion Chisholm was buried near Nether Menzion in a grave that can no longer be found.

Around this time, Sir David Murray also acquired Nether Menzion which his son William inherited in 1654. The lands eventually became the property of Sir David Murray, nephew of John Murray of Broughton, who was active in the Jacobite rising of 1745. As a result of his participation, the Murray estates were confiscated (as were those other Jacobite sympathisers). Many properties on the Stanhope estate were tenanted by members of the Tweedie family with whom the Murrays had at various times fought or intermarried.

== See also ==
- List of places in the Scottish Borders
- List of places in Scotland
