= Victoria Lodge railway station =

Disused railway station in Tweedsmuir, Scottish Borders

Victoria Lodge

General information
- Location: Tweedsmuir, Scottish Borders; Scotland
- Coordinates: 55.4926°N 3.4149°W
- Grid reference: NT107230
- Platforms: 1

Other information
- Status: Disused

History
- Original company: North British Railway

Key dates
- 1897: Opened
- 1905: Closed
Location

Victoria Lodge railway station served the village of Tweedsmuir, Scottish Borders, Scotland from 1897 to 1905 on the Symington, Biggar and Broughton Railway and the Talla Railway.

The station was close to Victoria Lodge, a B-Listed house that was owned by the Trustees of the Edinburgh Water Company, built 1900.

== History ==
The station opened in 1897 by the North British Railway. To the west was Talla Water which was served by various sidings. In its last year of life on 28 September, two special trains ran to the station. It closed later in the same year.

Preceding station	Disused railways	Following station
Crook Halt; Line and station closed	North British Railway; Symington, Biggar and Broughton Railway	Broughton; Line and station closed
Crook Halt; Line and station closed	North British Railway; Talla Railway	Terminus
