= Porteous family =

Scottish Borders armigerous family

Arms of Porteous: Azure a thistle between three buck’s heads erased or. Another, older version of the coat of arms omits the thistle.

The Porteous family is a Scottish Borders armigerous family.

== History ==
The earliest records for members of the Porteous family in Peeblesshire date back to the early part of the fifteenth century.

The earliest possible reference, according to Lord Lyon King of Arms in Edinburgh, is to a Guillaume Porteuse (later William Porteous), who arrived from Normandy c 1400 under the patronage of the wealthy Fraise family (later to become the Frasers). They had already settled in parts of lowland Scotland, having been granted lands by the King.

The early meaning of the name Porteuse (from the French) was indeed possibly of 'courier' or 'messenger'. But in Scotland, they turned their hand to other trades. In the days when the glens and hamlets of Tweeddale and, later, Annandale were much more densely populated than today, they seem to have pursued various occupations – from millers and blacksmiths to ministers of religion.

The home of early members of the Porteous family for many hundreds of years was Hawkshaw in Peeblesshire. The link to modern day families is as yet unproven. There is some doubt as to how long the family had held the ancestral family home, but it is certain that there was a castle of sorts at Hawkshaw, probably built as no more than a small fortified keep, and intended as a watch tower where a signal fire could be lit to warn of approaching danger. A line of these so-called Peel towers was built in the 1430s across the Tweed valley from Berwick to its source, as a response to the dangers of attacks from the Border reivers. Hawkshaw was one of over two dozen of these in Peeblesshire alone.

During the eighteenth century there began a massive migration of families from Scotland, initially to England and Ireland – and eventually to the New World and the newly discovered countries of the British Empire.

The reasons for this were many – and changed considerably during the following three hundred years. The historical background was turbulent and Scotland saw many changes which led to emigration of large numbers of both Highland and Lowland families.

The Lowland Clearances (1760–1830), especially, resulted in a massive movement of poor Scots from the Lowlands to the growing industrial centres of Glasgow and northern England – to Newcastle, Liverpool and eventually to London and other large cities and ports. Families were tempted by the offer of employment in the fast-growing industries which had burgeoned with the coming of the Industrial Revolution and the promise of a higher standard of living.

The subsequent depopulation of the Lowlands and the Highland Potato Famine of 1836–37 added to those who chose to leave. Over 1.7 million people left Scotland from 1846 to 1852, primarily going to Nova Scotia and Canada. They left in vast numbers to seek better fortune on the other side of the Atlantic.

== Some notable members ==
- John Porteous (c. 1695–1736), Captain of the City Guard of Edinburgh
- Beilby Porteus (1731–1809), Bishop of Chester, London and noted abolitionist
- Thomas Porteous (1765–1830), merchant and politician in Lower Canada
- James Porteous (1848–1922), Scottish-American inventor of the Fresno Scraper
- Gladstone Porteous (1874–1944), Australian missionary to China, translator of the Bible into the Yi language
- Stanley Porteus (1883–1972), Australian psychologist and author
- Thomas Porteous (c. 1864–1919), footballer for Sunderland and England
- George Porteous (1903–1977), Lieutenant-Governor of Saskatchewan, Canada
- Hugh Gordon Porteus (1906–1993), English art and literature critic
- Ian R. Porteous (1930–2011), Scottish mathematician
- John Alexander Porteous (1932–1995), Canadian columnist and journalist
- Norman Porteous (1898–2003), Scottish theologian and translator of the New English Bible; last surviving officer of the First World War
- Patrick Anthony Porteous (1918–2000), Scottish war hero, recipient of the Victoria Cross
- Rose Porteous (1948– ), Filipino-born Australian socialite
- Shane Porteous (1942– ), Australian actor
- Thomas Porteous (1946–2021), former US District Court judge
- Timothy Porteous (1933–2020), Canadian administrator, former executive assistant to Pierre Trudeau
- Trevor Porteous (1933–1997), English footballer for Stockport County F.C.
- William Porteous (1945– ), Australian land developer
- Julian Porteous (1949– ), bishop, Archdiocese of Sydney, Australia
- David John Porteous (1954– ), Scottish geneticist
- Ian Porteous (1964– ), Scottish footballer
- Ryan Porteous (1999– ), Scottish footballer for Watford F.C.

== The Porteous family today ==
Branches of the family having emigrated to five continents, there is an active family research group which seeks to help family members seeking more information about their ancestors. The cairn at Hawkshaw has, over the years, become a place of pilgrimage for members of the Porteous family, and an international reunion was traditionally held at the nearby Crook Inn, Tweedsmuir every five years, attracting visitors from all over the world. In September 2021 it is planned that the celebrations will be held nearby, as the inn has been bought by a Tweedsmuir community group and is currently being refurbished.

== See also ==
- The Lowland Clearances
- Porteous Riots
- Crook Inn
- The Heart of Mid-Lothian
