= Talla Water =

River in Dumfries and Galloway, Scotland

Coordinates: 55.47095°N 3.37171°W

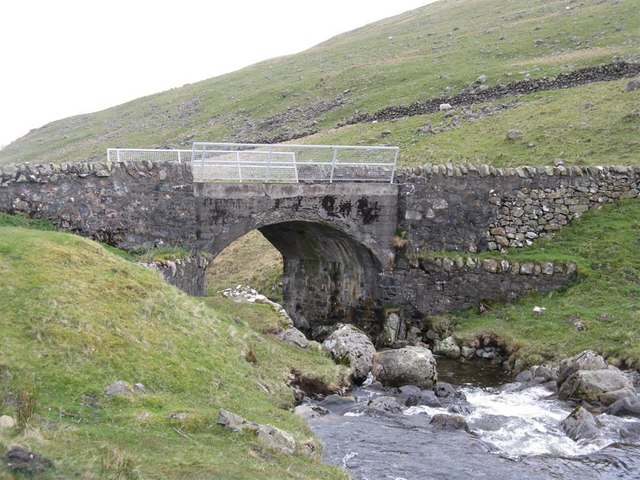
Bridge over the Talla Water near the Megget Stone

Talla Water is a river in the Scottish Borders area of Scotland, near Tweedsmuir. It feeds the Talla Reservoir, and is a tributary of the River Tweed. Above the reservoir are a series of waterfalls known as the Talla Linns.

The Talla Railway was constructed to facilitate the building work, especially the Tweed Viaduct.

== See also ==
- List of places in the Scottish Borders
- List of places in Scotland
