= West Water Reservoir =

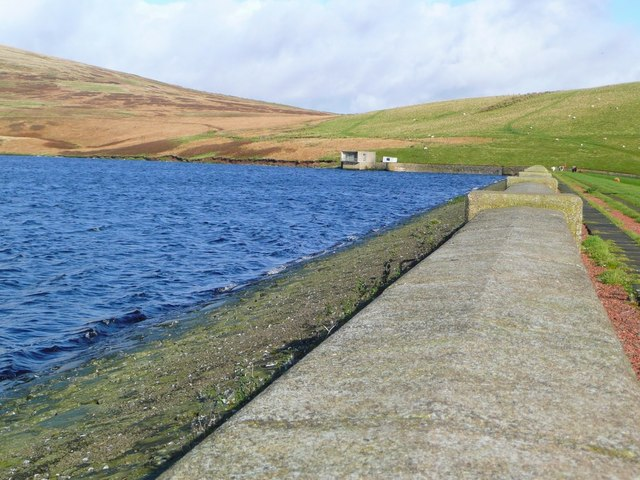
- West Water Reservoir dam

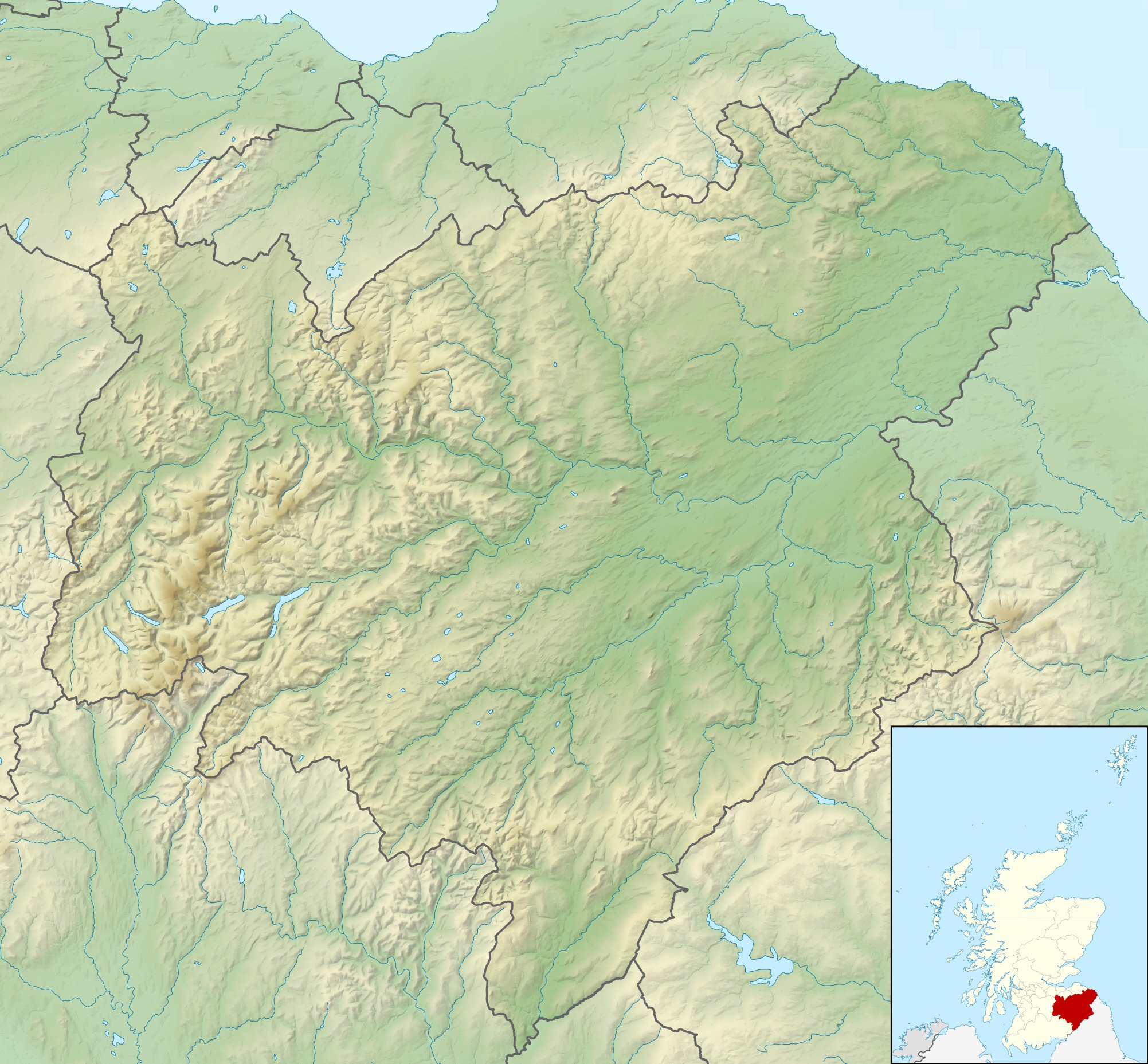
- Location within Scottish Borders
- Location: Pentland Hills, Scottish Borders
- Coordinates: 55°45′23″N 3°24′29″W
- Type: reservoir
- Basin countries: Scotland
- Surface elevation: 320 m (1,050 ft)

Ramsar Wetland
- Official name: Westwater
- Designated: 27 November 1995
- Reference no.: 780

West Water Reservoir (sometimes Westwater Reservoir) is an artificial reservoir in the Pentland Hills, Scottish Borders, 3 kilometres (1.9 miles) west of West Linton, and 26 kilometres (16 miles) south west of Edinburgh. It is a drinking water reservoir for Edinburgh and the Lothians and is located 320 metres (1,050 ft) above sea level. It is an important site for wildfowl and is designated as a SSSI and a Ramsar site.

== Description ==
West Water reservoir was opened in 1969 with an earthwork dam on the West Water, a tributary of the Lyne Water which, in turn, is a tributary of the River Tweed. The reservoir has an area of 36.8 hectares (91 acres). The reservoir is surrounded by the North Slipperfield Estate which manages the land for rough grazing and shooting.

== Archaeology ==
Erosion caused by the creation of the reservoir exposed an Early Bronze Age flat cist cemetery. When this was excavated the archaeologists found nine surviving cists. These contained remains from both inhumations and cremations and most of the deceased were sub-adult or young adults. Evidence of floral tributes was found in three burials and grave goods were also found.

== Fishing ==
West Water reservoir is used by fly fishing anglers and is stocked with brown trout. The fishing rights were transferred from Scottish Water to the local angling club in 2003.

== Conservation ==
West Water Reservoir is a Site of Special Scientific Interest and a Ramsar site. The reason for this is that in the autumn and winter the reservoir is host to a large roost of pink-footed geese which, in the years 2003–2008 had an average peak number of over 40,000 birds, almost 115 of the total population of this species. In addition to the pink-footed geese there is a diverse community of wildlife around the reservoir including breeding common gull, common ringed plover, dunlin and common tern. Other important wintering and passage species include common goldeneye, barnacle goose, tufted duck and Eurasian teal.

== See also ==
- List of reservoirs and dams in the United Kingdom
- Baddinsgill Reservoir
- Fruid Reservoir
- Megget Reservoir
- Talla Reservoir
