= Fruid Water =

Coordinates: 55.4815°N 3.448°W

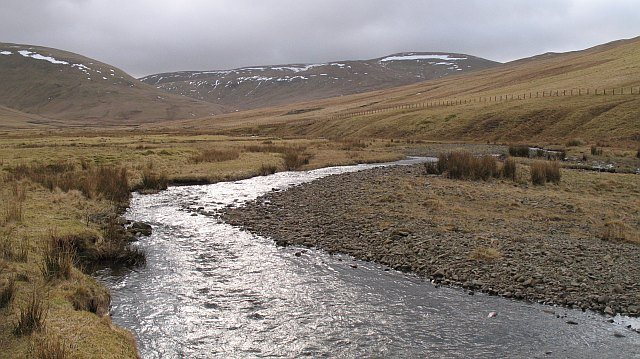
- Fruid Water above Fruid Reservoir

Location
- Country: United Kingdom
- Part: Scotland, England

Physical characteristics
- Mouth: Tweed
- Basin size: 23.7 km^{2}
- Depth
  - average: 0.66 cubic metres
- Discharge
  - location: Fruid Reservoir

Fruid Water is a river in the Scottish Borders area of Scotland. The valley it occupies has been dammed to form the Fruid Reservoir. The river is a tributary of the Tweed, with a confluence about 2 km upstream of Tweedsmuir. The river has a catchment area of 23.7 km^{2}, and a mean flow rate of 0.66 cubic metres per second leaving the reservoir.
