= Hawkshaw, Scottish Borders =

Village in Scottish Borders, Scotland

Coordinates: 55.48677°N 3.46469°W

Hawkshaw is a pair of semi-detached houses on the River Tweed, two miles southwest of Tweedsmuir in the Scottish Borders. Historically part of Peeblesshire, the original village of Hawkshaw was destroyed when the Fruid Reservoir was constructed in 1963, and is remembered as the ancestral family home of the Porteous family, dating from at least 1439.

A fortified tower stood on a hill overlooking the village for hundreds of years, although little remains of it now, its site being marked with a cairn built from stones from the original tower; this was probably one of a series of so-called Peel towers, small fortified keeps built along the Scottish Borders, intended as watch towers where signal fires could be lit to warn of approaching danger. A line of these towers was built in the 1430s across the Tweed valley from Berwick to its source (a few miles from Hawkshaw) as a response to the dangers of invasion from the English Borders. Hawkshaw was one of over two dozen of these in Peeblesshire alone.

Roman artefacts have also been found in the vicinity, pre-dating the tower and indicating continuity of habitation in the area for some hundreds of years.

The cairn plays host to a gathering of Porteous family members from all over the world every five years. The September 2005 gathering attracted seventy family members from five continents, and a short religious service was followed by the laying of a wreath at the cairn, in memory of all fallen Porteous servicemen and women.

== See also ==
- List of places in the Scottish Borders
- List of places in Scotland
- Biggar Museum Trust

Next Peel tower upwards	Tweed Valley	Next Peel tower downwards
Fruid	Hawkshaw	Oliver Castle
