= Talla Railway =

Former railway line in Scotland

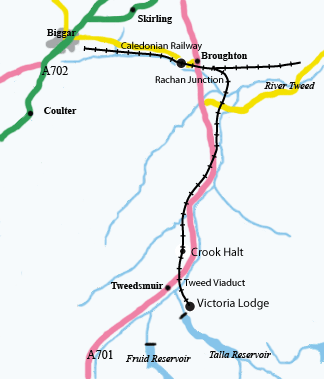
- Schematic map

Overview
- Locale: Broughton, Scotland

History
- Opened: 1897
- Succeeded by: Caledonian Railway
- Closed: 1910

Technical
- Track gauge: 4 ft 8 1/2 in (1,435 mm)

The Talla Railway was a privately constructed railway line in southern Scotland under the Edinburgh Water Company. It was built 1895–97 to aid the construction of the Talla Reservoir, to serve the water demand of Edinburgh. The railway was about eight miles (13 km) long, running south from a connection with the Caledonian Railway's Peebles branch at Broughton. A private passenger service was operated for workmen on the reservoir construction.

The reservoir was inaugurated in 1905 and the railway was lifted by 1912.

== Route ==
Starting from Caledonian Railway metals at Rachan Junction, near Broughton station (originally part of the Symington, Biggar and Broughton Railway), the railway followed the route of the River Tweed and what is now the A701 closely for 8 miles (13 km) in a southerly direction. It extended to Victoria Lodge, the headquarters for the dam's construction. An intermediate stop with wooden platforms was later established at Crook Halt, to serve the Crook Inn.

== History ==
=== Planning ===
Towards the end of the nineteenth century, urban development and changing domestic habits substantially increased the demand for water in Edinburgh and other conurbations. In 1894 the Edinburgh and District Water Trust selected the valley of the Talla Water near Tweedsmuir, in the Scottish Borders, to create a new reservoir: it became the Talla Reservoir. The exceptionally high rainfall in the district made the location attractive. The water surface is 950 feet (290 m) above sea level, and the water was to be piped 35 miles (56 km) to Alnwickhill in Edinburgh. The land belonged to Sir Graham Graham-Montgomery, and was purchased from him for £20,425.

The location of the proposed reservoir was remote and large quantities of construction materials would be required to construct the earth dam. The Water Trust decided to construct a private railway for the purpose. The Peebles branch of the Caledonian Railway (which had been built as the Symington, Biggar and Broughton Railway) ran west to east through Broughton, and the Trust negotiated with the Caledonian Railway over a private branch line connection. This was agreed in April 1895. The private railway would run southwards for about eight miles (13 km) along the valley of the River Tweed from east of Broughton station. The Caledonian agreed to lay a second track, at the expense of the Water Trust, alongside its own single line from Broughton station to the point of divergence of the new railway. At first a northwards branch line at Broughton was planned to extract clay for sealing the reservoir, but this was later changed, and the material was imported from elsewhere.

=== Construction ===
Victoria Lodge, 2006

The main contractor for the construction of the reservoir, and the line, was James Young and Sons of Edinburgh; the contract for the railway construction was for £49,113, and work started on 28 September 1895. Engineering design was by J and A Leslie and Reid of Edinburgh.

In March 1897 more than half of the railway had been built, from Broughton to the Tweed Bridge near Tweedsmuir, and the Caledonian Railway ran an inspection train from Edinburgh to the site. The line had a ruling gradient of 1 in 50. The contract for the construction of the reservoir was let in April, and the substantial wrought iron truss bridge over the Tweed was completed on 20 August 1897. (Note: Marshall says it was a steel bowstring, but from contemporary photographs it is plainly not; see also Paxton and Shipway. The abutments were faced with Italian granite.) A ceremony for the official opening of the line and stone-laying for the reservoir took place on 29 September 1897, when a special train again ran from Edinburgh, this time to Victoria Lodge, a management building constructed by the Water Trust at the north end of the planned reservoir.

The train was named "The Tweedsmuir Express" and consisted of six six-wheel coaches, modern bogie stock being unable to negotiate the line because of curvature and clearance issues.

The main contractor, James Young and Sons, began to get into financial difficulty as the work progressed. On 8 September 1899 the company's locomotive Talla was working at Broughton when it became derailed, blocking the passenger line. The Caledonian Railway was evidently dissatisfied with the technical standards of Young's rolling stock, for they now prohibited Talla (Note: And presumably Young's three other engines.) from working on to Caledonian track. Young was unable to respond to the situation, and the Water Trust now asked the Caledonian to work the private railway, but this was refused. Young and Sons went into liquidation and a bankruptcy hearing on 26 October 1899 resulted in the contract being re-allocated to John Best of Leith, who had been one of the main sub-contractors on the project, the other being Robert McAlpine & Sons. Best opened a halt at Crook Siding, close to the Crook Inn, which proved very popular with workers returning after their work, who would stop there for refreshments. Best had shrewdly bought a share of the inn prior to this.

Although the Talla Railway was built for the reservoir construction, a workmen's passenger service from Broughton station was operated on it. Best increased the locomotive fleet to six (Note: He also used a seventh on constructing an aqueduct near Glencorse as part of the water supply work.) and had two ex-Caledonian passenger coaches for his workmen's trains.

=== Completion ===
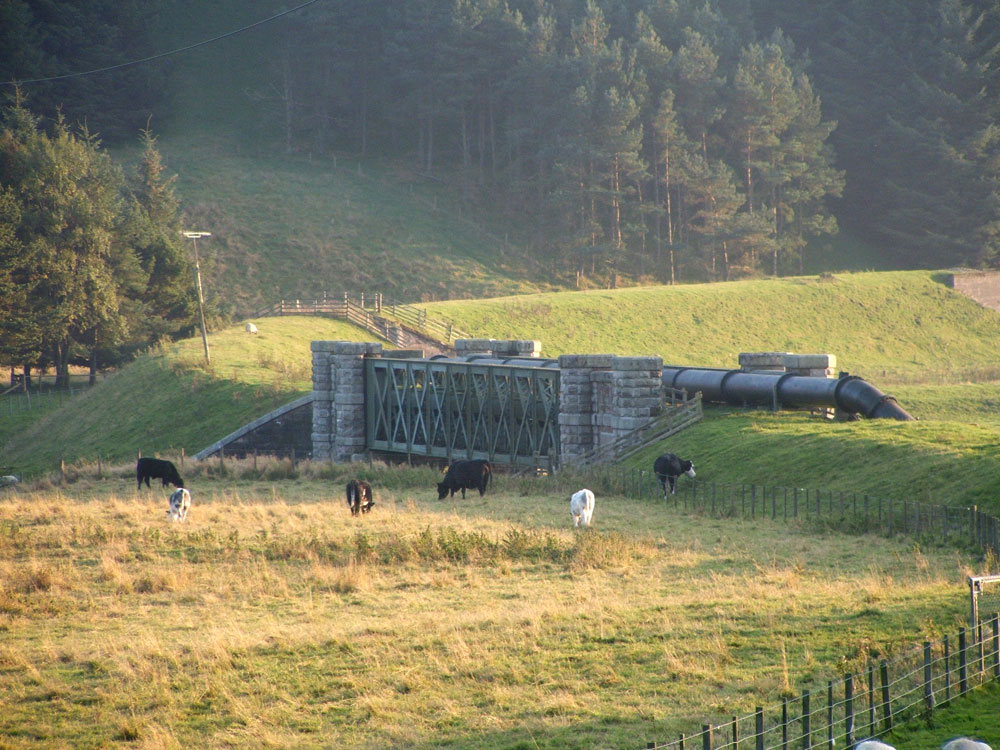
The Tweed Viaduct with water pipe

The reservoir was substantially complete in early 1905 and a valve-opening ceremony took place on 20 May. Two special trains were run from Edinburgh to bring invited guests, although some motored there from Peebles. The construction cost £1.25 million. Sir Walter Thorburn added a plea to continue the operation of the line to run public passenger trains for the benefit of the residents of Tweedsmuir. The population there was very small, having been 196 and declining in 1861, and the request was declined.

In subsequent years several approaches were made, but the Caledonian had evaluated the potential loss from agreeing to operate a branch line to such a small community, and continued to decline to do so.

In 1910 a contract was awarded to P J Maclennan Ltd of Glasgow to remove the track, for £6,431 and this was done over the following two years, using a hired-in Caledonian locomotive. The track materials were completely stripped. Only the ballast and formation remain, and can still be traced. The Tweed bridge remains in situ and carries a water pipe as part of the feed to Edinburgh.

Victoria Lodge was later sold, and for some time was a guest house. It is now a private residence.
