= Fruid Reservoir =

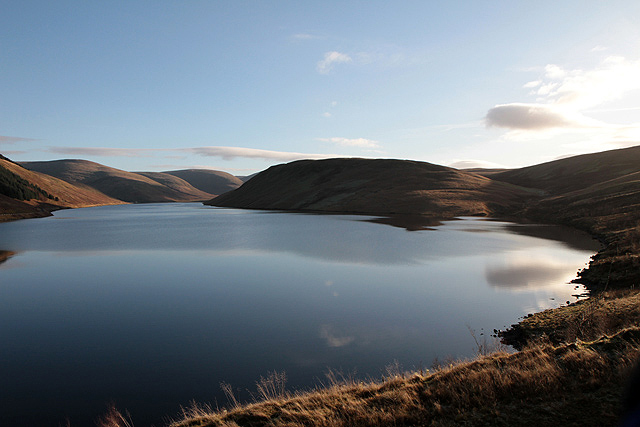

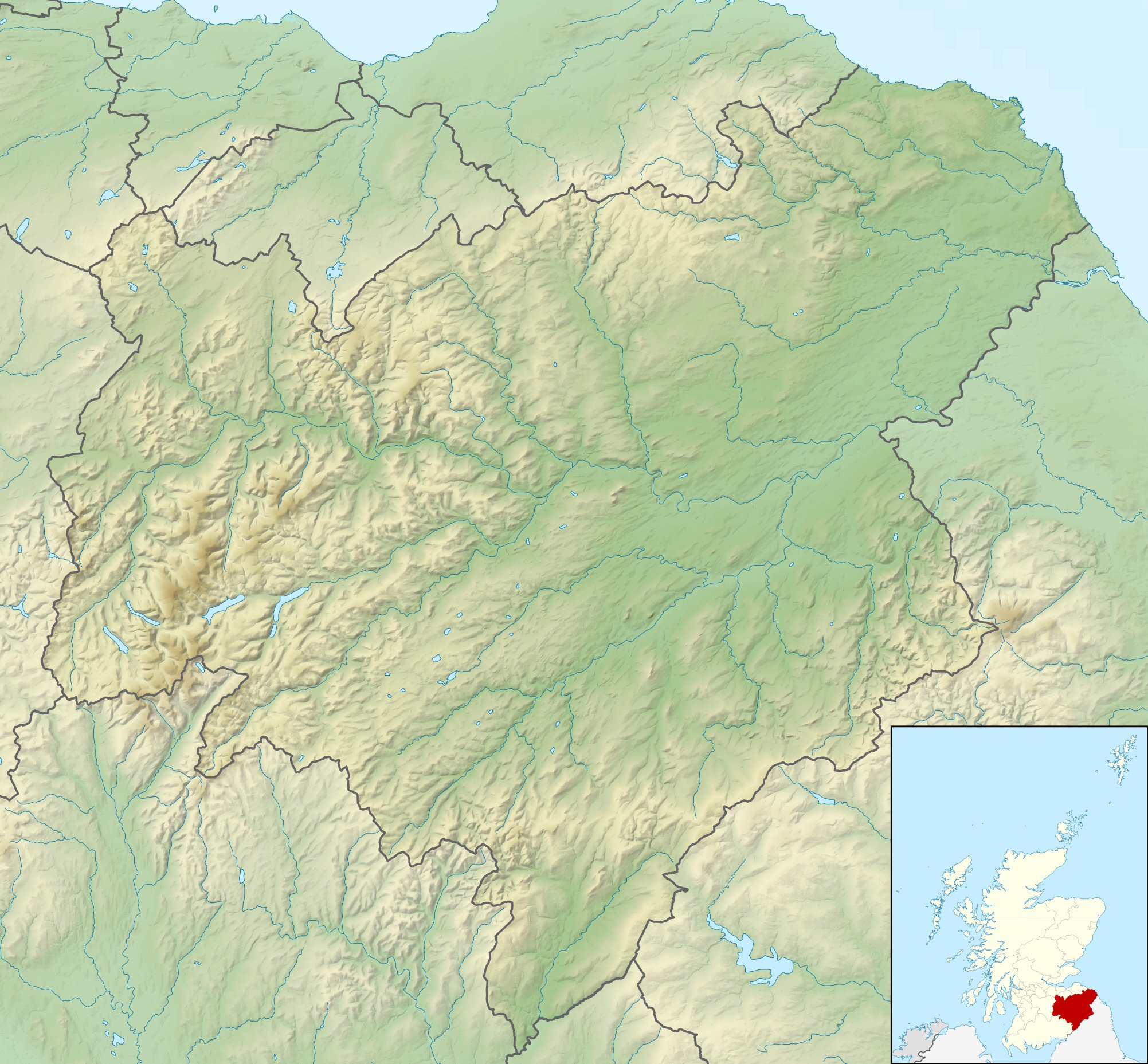
- Location within Scottish Borders
- Location: Scottish Borders, Scotland
- Coordinates: 55°27′30″N 3°25′50″W
- Type: reservoir
- Basin countries: United Kingdom
- Surface area: 139.6 ha (345 acres)

Fruid is a small reservoir in the Scottish Borders area of Scotland, UK, near Menzion. It is formed by damming the Fruid Water, and supplements the contents of Talla Reservoir, forming part of the water supply for Edinburgh.

The construction of the reservoir flooded the valley, inundating several farmhouses including Hawkshaw. Playwright Peter Moffat had ancestors that previously lived in the area now covered by water and cites the location as inspiration for The Village.

== See also ==
- Baddinsgill Reservoir
- Megget Reservoir
- Talla Reservoir
- West Water Reservoir
- List of reservoirs and dams in the United Kingdom
