= Talla Reservoir =

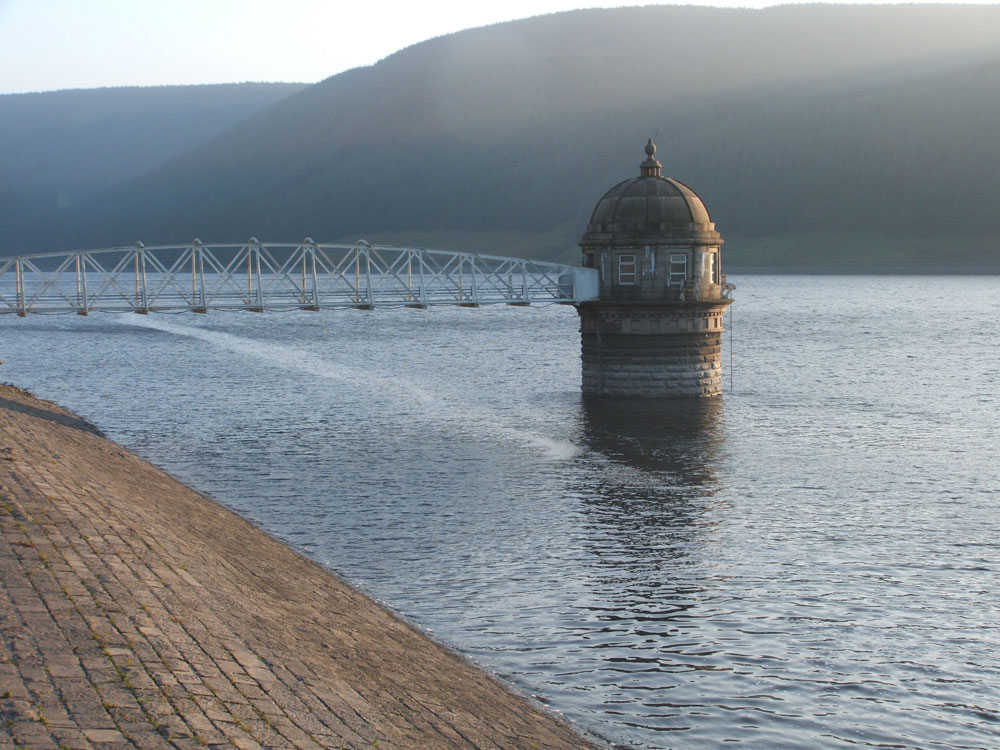
- (2006)

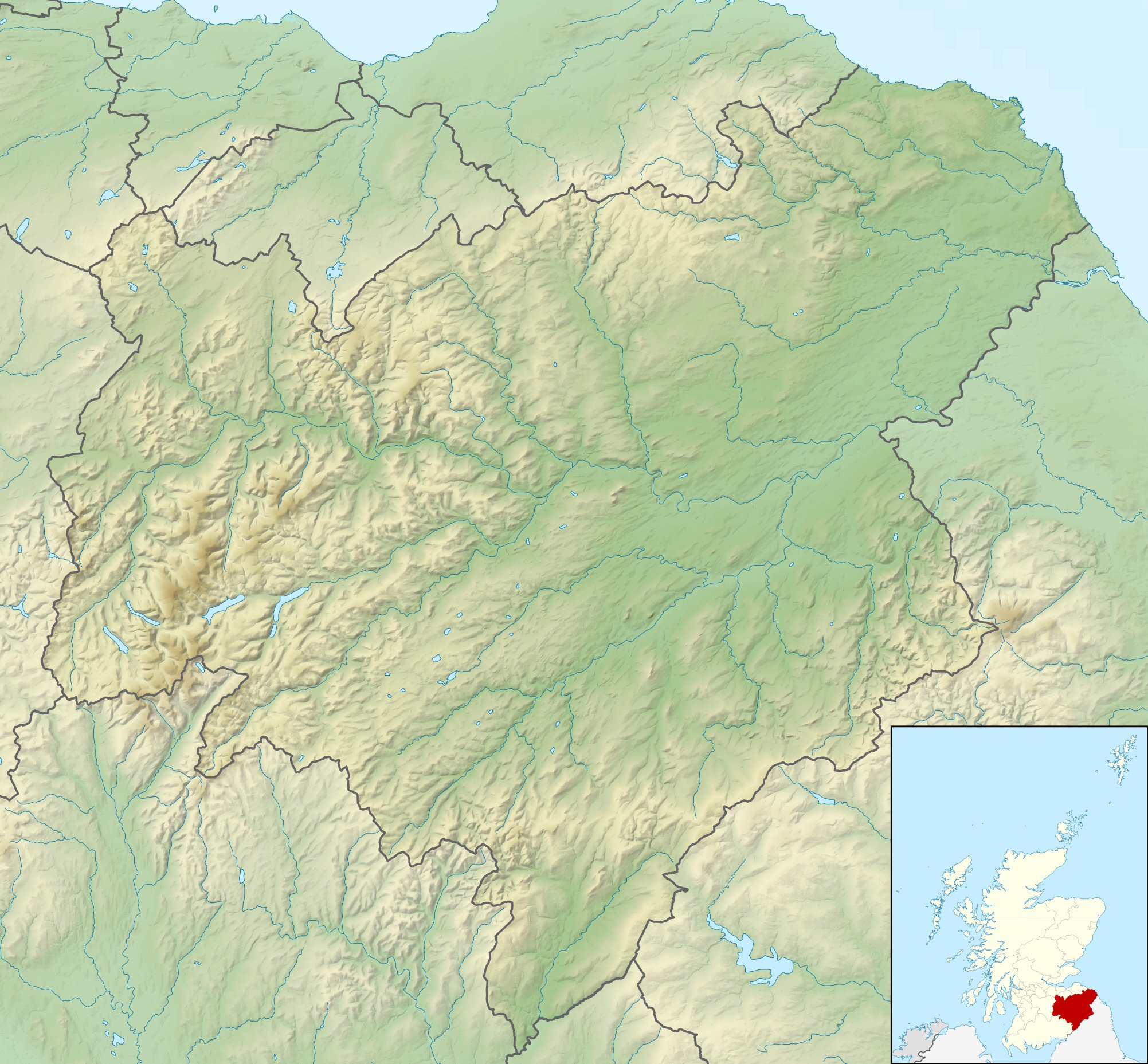
- Location within Scottish Borders
- Location: Tweedsmuir, Scotland
- Coordinates: 55°29′N 3°24′W
- Type: reservoir
- Catchment area: 2,501 ha (6,180 acres)
- Basin countries: United Kingdom
- Surface area: 121 ha (300 acres)
- Water volume: 12.7 million cubic metres (10,300 acre⋅ft)

Talla Reservoir, located a mile from Tweedsmuir, Scottish Borders, Scotland, is an earth-work dam fed by Talla Water. The reservoir is supplemented by water from the nearby Fruid Reservoir. It was opened in 1905. To assist in bringing the materials for its construction, the Talla Railway was built.

== History ==
In the late 19th century engineers surveying for the Edinburgh and District Water Trust (EDWT) identified the area around the loch at Talla in the hills above Tweedsmuir in the Scottish Borders as an ideal site for a new reservoir to supply the increasing water demands of the expanding city of Edinburgh, 28 miles to the north. In the mid-1890s the land was secured from the Trustees of the Earl of Wemyss and March Estates for £20,000. Construction was by James Young & Sons.

On 29 September 1897 a stone-laying ceremony marked the start of construction of Victoria Lodge, at the southern terminus. The lodge was built as the headquarters for the Trustees of the Edinburgh Water Company. A category B listed house in the Scots Renaissance style, it sits in its own private grounds overlooking the reservoir.

All materials for construction were lifted from there to the construction site by a ropeway, called a 'Blondin' after the famous tightrope walker Charles Blondin. These included stone and aggregates from quarries in North Queensferry and Craigleith, pipes, valve gear and pumping equipment from central Scotland, as well as the clay, gravel and sand used in the dam embankment. Puddle clay, for the watertight barrier within the dam came from the Carluke area; this material was initially developed by James Brindley for canal lining. In total, over 100,000 tons of material were transported for the building of the reservoir, and at least 30 of the workmen (who were mostly Irish) died during construction and are buried at Tweedsmuir churchyard.

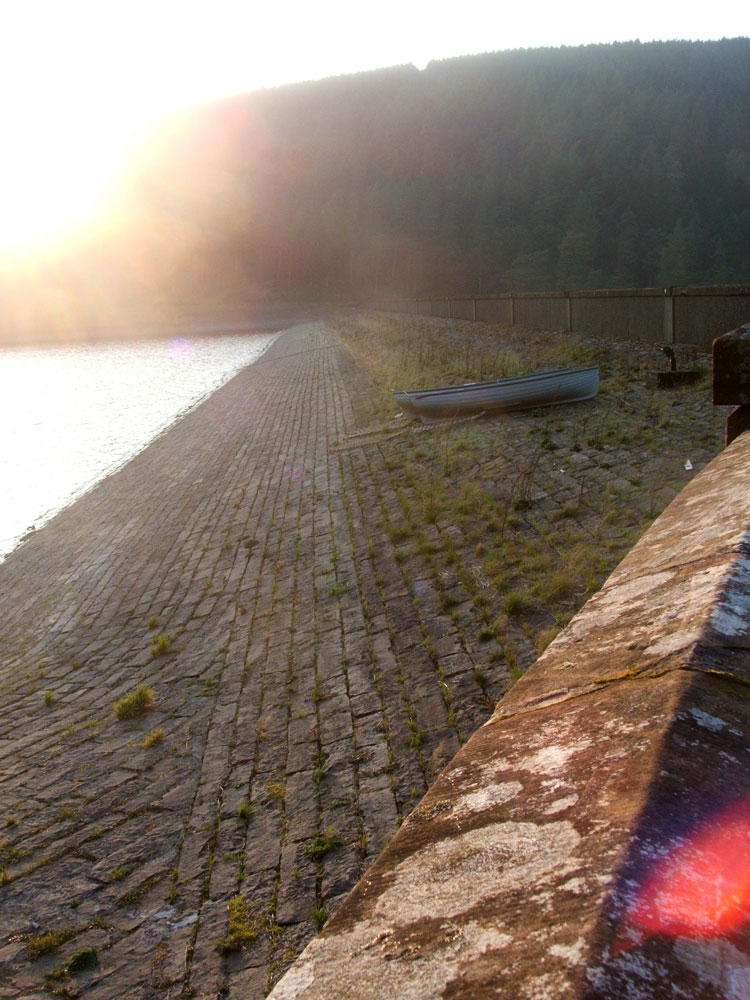
The dam, 2006

Construction work was virtually complete by late 1904 and Talla Water was diverted into the bed of the reservoir on 20 May 1905. The official opening ceremony on 28 September was carried out by Lady Cranston, wife of the Lord Provost.

The total cost was £1.25 million (the equivalent of £156 million in 2020).

== See also ==
- List of places in the Scottish Borders
- List of places in Scotland
- List of reservoirs and dams in the United Kingdom

== Sources ==
- John Furneval's article on Railscot
