= Tweedsmuir =

Coordinates: 55°30′21″N 3°25′53″W

Tweedsmuir: Scottish Gaelic: Sliabh Thuaidh
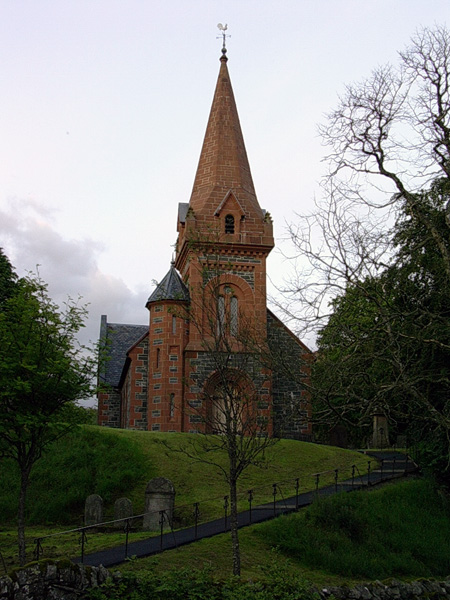
- Parish Church of Tweedsmuir, built of Scottish red sandstone.

- Location within the Scottish Borders
- OS grid reference: NT098243
  - Edinburgh: 32 mi (51 km)
  - London: 308 mi (496 km)
- Council area: Scottish Borders
- Lieutenancy area: Tweeddale
- Country: Scotland
- Sovereign state: United Kingdom
- Post town: BIGGAR
- Postcode district: ML12
- Police: Scotland
- Fire: Scottish
- Ambulance: Scottish
- UK Parliament: Dumfriesshire, Clydesdale and Tweeddale
- Scottish Parliament: Midlothian South, Tweeddale and Lauderdale

Tweedsmuir (Scottish Gaelic: Sliabh Thuaidh) is a village and civil parish in Tweeddale, the Scottish Borders Council district, southeastern Scotland.

== Geography ==
The village is set in a valley, with the rolling hills and burns on both sides, covering some fifty square miles. It incorporates settlements at Hearthstane, Cockiland, Menzion, and Oliver.

Tweedsmuir was in the historic county of Peeblesshire. It is situated 8 miles (13 km) from the source of the River Tweed.

== History ==
James Hogg recorded that in 1620 a severe storm remembered as 'the thirteen drifty days' caused such severe sheep losses that a glen in Tweedsmuir owned by Sir James Montgomery was converted to a common grazing and remained as such for almost a century.

== Landmarks and features ==
Oliver Castle was one of the local strongholds, and later country estates, of the Clan Tweedie family.

The Parish Church of Tweedsmuir was built with Scottish red sandstone in 1874 on site of earlier 1643 structure. It is a Category B listed building. There are notable Tweedie gravestones in the parish churchyard.

The Crook Inn is in the village, on the A701. It is one of many claimants to be the oldest inn in Scotland. It is where Robert Burns wrote "Willie Wastle's Wife".

The 22 MW Glenkerie wind farm of Infinis is located five kilometres (three miles) northwest of the village.

=== Talla Reservoir ===
The Talla Reservoir is nearby. In 1894 the Edinburgh and District Water Trustees decided to build Talla as the new source of water for Edinburgh. The surface and the gradient of the main road were unsuitable for carting the quantities of material that would be needed for the new reservoir, so the Talla Railway was built from Broughton to Talla. While work on the railway and the reservoir was in progress, a large number of workmen lived in Tweedsmuir, dramatically increasing the population.

The valve-closing ceremony was held at Talla on 20 May 1905, and on 28 September, when the reservoir was about two-fifths full, there was an inaugural ceremony. The large company was brought from Edinburgh in two special trains, which were hauled for the last stage of the journey, from Broughton Station, by small service engines on the Talla railway.

Fruid Reservoir is also nearby.

== See also ==
- Baron Tweedsmuir
- List of places in the Scottish Borders
