= List of listed buildings in the Scottish Borders =

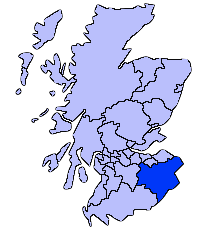
Scottish Borders shown within Scotland

This is a list of listed buildings in the Scottish Borders. The list is split out by parish.

- List of listed buildings in Abbey St Bathans, Scottish Borders
- List of listed buildings in Ancrum, Scottish Borders
- List of listed buildings in Ashkirk, Scottish Borders
- List of listed buildings in Ayton, Scottish Borders
- List of listed buildings in Bedrule, Scottish Borders
- List of listed buildings in Bowden, Scottish Borders
- List of listed buildings in Broughton, Glenholm And Kilbucho, Scottish Borders
- List of listed buildings in Bunkle And Preston, Scottish Borders
- List of listed buildings in Caddonfoot, Scottish Borders
- List of listed buildings in Castleton, Scottish Borders
- List of listed buildings in Cavers, Scottish Borders
- List of listed buildings in Channelkirk, Scottish Borders
- List of listed buildings in Chirnside, Scottish Borders
- List of listed buildings in Cockburnspath, Scottish Borders
- List of listed buildings in Coldingham, Scottish Borders
- List of listed buildings in Coldstream, Scottish Borders
- List of listed buildings in Crailing, Scottish Borders
- List of listed buildings in Cranshaws, Scottish Borders
- List of listed buildings in Drumelzier, Scottish Borders
- List of listed buildings in Duns, Scottish Borders
- List of listed buildings in Earlston, Scottish Borders
- List of listed buildings in Eccles, Scottish Borders
- List of listed buildings in Eckford, Scottish Borders
- List of listed buildings in Eddleston, Scottish Borders
- List of listed buildings in Ednam, Scottish Borders
- List of listed buildings in Edrom, Scottish Borders
- List of listed buildings in Ettrick, Scottish Borders
- List of listed buildings in Eyemouth, Scottish Borders
- List of listed buildings in Fala And Soutra, Scottish Borders
- List of listed buildings in Fogo, Scottish Borders
- List of listed buildings in Foulden, Scottish Borders
- List of listed buildings in Galashiels, Scottish Borders
- List of listed buildings in Gordon, Scottish Borders
- List of listed buildings in Greenlaw, Scottish Borders
- List of listed buildings in Hawick, Scottish Borders
- List of listed buildings in Heriot, Scottish Borders
- List of listed buildings in Hobkirk, Scottish Borders
- List of listed buildings in Hownam, Scottish Borders
- List of listed buildings in Hume, Scottish Borders
- List of listed buildings in Hutton, Scottish Borders
- List of listed buildings in Innerleithen, Scottish Borders
- List of listed buildings in Jedburgh, Scottish Borders
- List of listed buildings in Kelso, Scottish Borders
- List of listed buildings in Kirkhope, Scottish Borders
- List of listed buildings in Kirkurd, Scottish Borders
- List of listed buildings in Ladykirk, Scottish Borders
- List of listed buildings in Langton, Scottish Borders
- List of listed buildings in Lauder, Scottish Borders
- List of listed buildings in Legerwood, Scottish Borders
- List of listed buildings in Lilliesleaf, Scottish Borders
- List of listed buildings in Linton, Scottish Borders
- List of listed buildings in Longformacus, Scottish Borders
- List of listed buildings in Lyne, Scottish Borders
- List of listed buildings in Makerstoun, Scottish Borders
- List of listed buildings in Manor, Scottish Borders
- List of listed buildings in Maxton, Scottish Borders
- List of listed buildings in Melrose, Scottish Borders
- List of listed buildings in Mertoun, Scottish Borders
- List of listed buildings in Minto, Scottish Borders
- List of listed buildings in Mordington, Scottish Borders
- List of listed buildings in Morebattle, Scottish Borders
- List of listed buildings in Nenthorn, Scottish Borders
- List of listed buildings in Newlands, Scottish Borders
- List of listed buildings in Oxnam, Scottish Borders
- List of listed buildings in Peebles, Scottish Borders
- List of listed buildings in Penicuik, Scottish Borders
- List of listed buildings in Polwarth, Scottish Borders
- List of listed buildings in Roberton, Scottish Borders
- List of listed buildings in Roxburgh, Scottish Borders
- List of listed buildings in Selkirk, Scottish Borders
- List of listed buildings in Skirling, Scottish Borders
- List of listed buildings in Smailholm, Scottish Borders
- List of listed buildings in Southdean, Scottish Borders
- List of listed buildings in Sprouston, Scottish Borders
- List of listed buildings in St Boswells, Scottish Borders
- List of listed buildings in Stichill, Scottish Borders
- List of listed buildings in Stobo, Scottish Borders
- List of listed buildings in Stow, Scottish Borders
- List of listed buildings in Swinton, Scottish Borders
- List of listed buildings in Teviothead, Scottish Borders
- List of listed buildings in Traquair, Scottish Borders
- List of listed buildings in Tweedsmuir, Scottish Borders
- List of listed buildings in Westruther, Scottish Borders
- List of listed buildings in Whitsome, Scottish Borders
- List of listed buildings in Yarrow, Scottish Borders
- List of listed buildings in Yetholm, Scottish Borders

== See also ==
- Scheduled monuments in the Scottish Borders
