= List of listed buildings in St Boswells, Scottish Borders =

This is a list of listed buildings in the parish of St Boswells in the Scottish Borders, Scotland.

== List ==
Name	Location	Date listed	Geo-coordinates	Notes	Category	LB number	Image
Dovecot Lessudden House			55°34′33″N 2°38′13″W		B	17413	Upload Photo
Mainhill House, St Boswells Including Outbuildings, Cartshed And Granary Range And Walled Garden			55°33′48″N 2°39′19″W		B	49850	Upload Photo
The Kennels, St Boswells' Green			55°34′02″N 2°39′03″W		B	17409	Upload Photo
Lessudden House			55°34′29″N 2°38′17″W		A	17412	Upload another image
St Boswells, Main Street, K6 Telephone Kiosk At Village Hall			55°34′16″N 2°38′44″W		B	19119	Upload Photo
Benrig, Crystal Well And Mule Gang			55°34′11″N 2°37′33″W		C(S)	48103	Upload Photo
Mertoun Bridge			55°34′50″N 2°37′14″W		B	17410	Upload Photo
Burial-Aisle, Lessudden House			55°34′32″N 2°38′18″W		B	17414	Upload Photo
The House Of Narrow Gates With Outbuildings And Garden Structures			55°34′24″N 2°38′36″W		C(S)	51162	Upload Photo

== Key ==
The scheme for classifying buildings in Scotland is:

- Category A: "buildings of national or international importance, either architectural or historic; or fine, little-altered examples of some particular period, style or building type."
- Category B: "buildings of regional or more than local importance; or major examples of some particular period, style or building type, which may have been altered."
- Category C: "buildings of local importance; lesser examples of any period, style, or building type, as originally constructed or moderately altered; and simple traditional buildings which group well with other listed buildings."

In March 2016 there were 47,288 listed buildings in Scotland. Of these, 8% were Category A, and 50% were Category B, with the remaining 42% being Category C.
