= List of listed buildings in Eckford, Scottish Borders =

This is a list of listed buildings in the parish of Eckford in the Scottish Borders, Scotland.

== List ==
Name	Location	Date Listed	Grid Ref. (Note: Sometimes known as OSGB36, the grid reference (where provided) is based on the British national grid reference system used by the Ordnance Survey. • "Guide to National Grid". Ordnance Survey. • "Get-a-map". Ordnance Survey.)	Geo-coordinates	Notes	LB Number (Note: Historic Environment Scotland assign a unique alphanumeric identifier to each designated site in Scotland, for listed buildings this always begins with "LB", for example "LB12345".)	Image
Kalemouth Suspension Bridge, Over River Teviot				55°32′24″N 2°27′49″W	Category A	3849	Upload another image
Caverton Mill Bridge				55°31′27″N 2°23′55″W	Category C(S)	3848	Upload Photo
Eckford Church And Graveyard				55°32′11″N 2°28′02″W	Category B	3840	Upload Photo
Marlfield				55°31′28″N 2°25′04″W	Category B	3843	Upload Photo
Stables, Marlfield				55°31′36″N 2°25′01″W	Category B	3844	Upload Photo
Cessford Castle				55°30′27″N 2°24′58″W	Category A	3845	Upload another image
Dovecot, Grahamslaw				55°32′11″N 2°26′30″W	Category B	3841	Upload Photo

== Key ==
The scheme for classifying buildings in Scotland is:

- Category A: "buildings of national or international importance, either architectural or historic; or fine, little-altered examples of some particular period, style or building type."
- Category B: "buildings of regional or more than local importance; or major examples of some particular period, style or building type, which may have been altered."
- Category C: "buildings of local importance; lesser examples of any period, style, or building type, as originally constructed or moderately altered; and simple traditional buildings which group well with other listed buildings."

In March 2016 there were 47,288 listed buildings in Scotland. Of these, 8% were Category A, and 50% were Category B, with the remaining 42% being Category C.
