= List of listed buildings in Ayton, Scottish Borders =

This is a list of listed buildings in the parish of Ayton in the Scottish Borders, Scotland.

== List ==
Name	Location	Date Listed	Grid Ref. (Note: Sometimes known as OSGB36, the grid reference (where provided) is based on the British national grid reference system used by the Ordnance Survey. • "Guide to National Grid". Ordnance Survey. • "Get-a-map". Ordnance Survey.)	Geo-coordinates	Notes	LB Number (Note: Historic Environment Scotland assign a unique alphanumeric identifier to each designated site in Scotland, for listed buildings this always begins with "LB", for example "LB12345".)	Image
Prenderguest Farmhouse Including Walled Garden, Boundary Walls, Gatepiers And Gates				55°49′43″N 2°07′59″W	Category B	1991	Upload Photo
Railway Bridges, Near Peelwalls House				55°49′52″N 2°07′26″W	Category C(S)	4	Upload Photo
Ayton, High Street, Ash Villa Including Boundary Wall				55°50′38″N 2°07′35″W	Category C(S)	46432	Upload Photo
Ayton, High Street, Moffat House				55°50′31″N 2°07′21″W	Category B	46438	Upload another image
Ayton Castle, Walled Garden Including Potting Sheds And Summerhouse				55°50′37″N 2°07′06″W	Category B	46447	Upload Photo
Ayton Parish Church, Church Of Scotland, Including Boundary Walls, Railings, Gatepiers, Gates And War Memorial				55°50′26″N 2°07′05″W	Category A	46451	Upload another image
Burnmouth, 14 - 20 (Inclusive Nos) Lower Burnmouth				55°50′26″N 2°03′55″W	Category B	46452	Upload another image
Littledean Farmhouse Including Garden Walls				55°51′18″N 2°07′49″W	Category B	46457	Upload Photo
Millbank Stables Boundary Walls, Quadrant Walls, Piers And Gatepiers				55°51′19″N 2°06′17″W	Category C(S)	46459	Upload Photo
West Flemington Farmhouse Including Garden Walls				55°50′27″N 2°05′50″W	Category B	46468	Upload Photo
Ayton Castle, Dovecot				55°50′47″N 2°06′47″W	Category A	1989	Upload Photo
Ayton, High Street, Red Lion Hotel Including Boundary Walls				55°50′36″N 2°07′32″W	Category C(S)	8	Upload Photo
Ayton, Beanburn, Summerhill Including Former Coach House				55°50′30″N 2°07′31″W	Category B	46430	Upload another image
Ayton Mains Farmhouse Including Garden Walls, Quadrant Walls And Gatepiers				55°51′08″N 2°06′22″W	Category B	46449	Upload Photo
Ayton Castle, South Lodge Including Screen Walls And Piers				55°50′29″N 2°07′12″W	Category B	1988	Upload Photo
Gunsgreenhill, Old Windmill				55°52′00″N 2°05′07″W	Category C(S)	5	Upload Photo
Ayton, Old Town, Hillside Including Boundary Wall				55°50′36″N 2°07′15″W	Category C(S)	10	Upload Photo
Ayton, 7 And 9 High Street				55°50′33″N 2°07′25″W	Category B	46431	Upload Photo
Ayton, Old Town, Melville House Including Ancillary Structure, Boundary Wall, Railings, Gatepier And Gates				55°50′32″N 2°07′21″W	Category C(S)	46444	Upload Photo
Netherbyres House Including Boundary Walls And Gatepiers				55°51′54″N 2°05′36″W	Category B	46460	Upload Photo
Peelwalls South Lodge				55°49′54″N 2°07′29″W	Category C(S)	46464	Upload Photo
Peelwalls Walled Garden				55°49′59″N 2°07′37″W	Category C(S)	46465	Upload Photo
Burnmouth Harbour				55°50′30″N 2°04′02″W	Category B	11	Upload another image See more images
Ayton, Beanburn, Summerhill Including Ancillary Structure And Boundary Wall				55°50′26″N 2°07′39″W	Category B	46429	Upload Photo
Ayton, High Street, Clock Tower House				55°50′35″N 2°07′28″W	Category C(S)	46435	Upload Photo
Ayton, High Street, Oaklands Including Boundary Walls And Railings				55°50′38″N 2°07′39″W	Category C(S)	46439	Upload Photo
Ayton, High Street, Sawmill House Including Boundary Walls				55°50′37″N 2°07′37″W	Category C(S)	46443	Upload Photo
1 And 2, 3 And 4 Ayton Mains Farm Cottages Including Cobbled Paths And Garden Walls				55°51′10″N 2°06′24″W	Category C(S)	46448	Upload Photo
Ayton Mill Farmhouse Including Ancillary Structure And Boundary Walls				55°50′26″N 2°07′19″W	Category C(S)	46450	Upload Photo
Netherbyres House, The Coach House And Stable Courtyard Including Cobbled Courtyard, Courtyard Walls, Gatepiers And Ancillary Structures				55°51′51″N 2°05′40″W	Category C(S)	46461	Upload Photo
Ayton Castle Including Service Courtyard, Courtyard Walls And Garden Rampart Walls				55°50′44″N 2°06′54″W	Category A	1987	Upload another image
Peelwalls House Including Garden Walls, Boundary Walls, Railings, Quadrant Walls, Railings, Piers, Gatepiers And Gates				55°49′59″N 2°07′34″W	Category B	1990	Upload Photo
Glebe House (Formerly Ayton Manse) Including Boundary Walls, Railings, Quadrant Walls, Gatepiers And Gates				55°50′23″N 2°07′14″W	Category C(S)	1	Upload Photo
Ayton, Beanburn, Heatherbank Including Boundary Wall And Gatepiers				55°50′30″N 2°07′27″W	Category C(S)	46426	Upload Photo
Ayton, Beanburn, The Retreat Including Former Coach House And Boundary Wall				55°50′30″N 2°07′34″W	Category C(S)	46428	Upload Photo
Ayton, High Street, Beech Villa Including Boundary Wall				55°50′38″N 2°07′37″W	Category C(S)	46434	Upload Photo
Ayton, High Street, St Margaret's Including Boundary Walls				55°50′35″N 2°07′31″W	Category C(S)	46442	Upload Photo
Ayton Castle, North Lodge Including Gatepiers				55°50′52″N 2°06′52″W	Category C(S)	46445	Upload Photo
Greystonelees Farmhouse Including Garden Walls, Quadrant Walls And Gatepiers				55°50′14″N 2°04′18″W	Category C(S)	46456	Upload Photo
Ayton, High Street, The Rowans Including Boundary Wall And Piers				55°50′38″N 2°07′39″W	Category C(S)	46441	Upload Photo
Whiterig Farmhouse Including Courtyard Walls And Gatepiers, And Walled Garden				55°49′16″N 2°07′36″W	Category B	46469	Upload Photo
St Dionysius' Church (Remains Of)				55°50′30″N 2°07′00″W	Category B	1986	Upload Photo
Ayton, Beanburn, Kirklands Including Former Coach House, Boundary Wall And Gatepiers				55°50′30″N 2°07′35″W	Category C(S)	46427	Upload Photo
Ayton, High Street, Beech Cottage Including Boundary Wall				55°50′38″N 2°07′38″W	Category C(S)	46433	Upload Photo
Ayton, High Street, The Old Schoolhouse Including Boundary Wall				55°50′35″N 2°07′30″W	Category C(S)	46440	Upload Photo
Burnmouth, Station House				55°50′35″N 2°04′32″W	Category C(S)	46453	Upload Photo
Fairnieside Farmhouse Including Garden Walls				55°50′44″N 2°05′15″W	Category C(S)	46455	Upload Photo
Peelwalls North Lodge				55°50′02″N 2°07′27″W	Category C(S)	46463	Upload Photo
Ayton, High Street, Colville House Including Boundary Wall And Gatepiers				55°50′38″N 2°07′34″W	Category B	46436	Upload Photo
Ayton, High Street, Colville Lodge Including Boundary Wall And Gatepiers				55°50′37″N 2°07′33″W	Category B	46437	Upload Photo
Ayton Castle, Stable Courtyard				55°50′50″N 2°06′51″W	Category B	46446	Upload Photo
Chesterbank Farmhouse Including Garden Walls				55°50′27″N 2°05′01″W	Category C(S)	46454	Upload Photo
Millbank Lodge Including Quadrant Walls, Piers And Gatepiers				55°51′17″N 2°06′13″W	Category C(S)	46458	Upload Photo
Netherbyres House, Walled Garden				55°51′55″N 2°05′30″W	Category B	46462	Upload Photo
St Dionysius' Church (Remains Of), Graveyard Including Gatepiers And Gates				55°50′30″N 2°06′58″W	Category B	46466	Upload Photo
West Flemington Farm Steading				55°50′27″N 2°05′47″W	Category B	46467	Upload Photo

== Key ==
The scheme for classifying buildings in Scotland is:

- Category A: "buildings of national or international importance, either architectural or historic; or fine, little-altered examples of some particular period, style or building type."
- Category B: "buildings of regional or more than local importance; or major examples of some particular period, style or building type, which may have been altered."
- Category C: "buildings of local importance; lesser examples of any period, style, or building type, as originally constructed or moderately altered; and simple traditional buildings which group well with other listed buildings."

In March 2016 there were 47,288 listed buildings in Scotland. Of these, 8% were Category A, and 50% were Category B, with the remaining 42% being Category C.
