= List of listed buildings in Ettrick, Scottish Borders =

This is a list of listed buildings in the parish of Ettrick in the Scottish Borders, Scotland.

== List ==
Name	Location	Date Listed	Grid Ref. (Note: Sometimes known as OSGB36, the grid reference (where provided) is based on the British national grid reference system used by the Ordnance Survey. • "Guide to National Grid". Ordnance Survey. • "Get-a-map". Ordnance Survey.)	Geo-coordinates	Notes	LB Number (Note: Historic Environment Scotland assign a unique alphanumeric identifier to each designated site in Scotland, for listed buildings this always begins with "LB", for example "LB12345".)	Image
Ramseycleuch Bridge				55°25′06″N 3°09′01″W	Category C(S)	13722	Upload Photo
Parish Church Of Ettrick And Buccleuch				55°25′08″N 3°10′15″W	Category B	8423	Upload Photo
Monument To The Ettrick Shepherd Ettrick Hall				55°25′05″N 3°09′57″W	Category B	8425	Upload Photo
Graveyard				55°25′07″N 3°10′15″W	Category B	8424	Upload Photo
Monument To The Ettrick Shepherd, Near Tibble Shiel's Inn				55°30′32″N 2°58′05″W	Category B	8430	Upload Photo
Tushielaw Bridge				55°26′51″N 3°06′13″W	Category C(S)	8429	Upload Photo
Kirkburn House Including Boundary Walls, Gatepiers And Gates				55°25′09″N 3°10′13″W	Category C(S)	10794	Upload Photo

== Key ==
The scheme for classifying buildings in Scotland is:

- Category A: "buildings of national or international importance, either architectural or historic; or fine, little-altered examples of some particular period, style or building type."
- Category B: "buildings of regional or more than local importance; or major examples of some particular period, style or building type, which may have been altered."
- Category C: "buildings of local importance; lesser examples of any period, style, or building type, as originally constructed or moderately altered; and simple traditional buildings which group well with other listed buildings."

In March 2016 there were 47,288 listed buildings in Scotland. Of these, 8% were Category A, and 50% were Category B, with the remaining 42% being Category C.
