= List of listed buildings in Polwarth, Scottish Borders =

This is a list of listed buildings in the parish of Polwarth in the Scottish Borders, Scotland.

== List ==
Name	Location	Date Listed	Grid Ref. (Note: Sometimes known as OSGB36, the grid reference (where provided) is based on the British national grid reference system used by the Ordnance Survey. • "Guide to National Grid". Ordnance Survey. • "Get-a-map". Ordnance Survey.)	Geo-coordinates	Notes	LB Number (Note: Historic Environment Scotland assign a unique alphanumeric identifier to each designated site in Scotland, for listed buildings this always begins with "LB", for example "LB12345".)	Image
Polwarth Manse Including Steading, Walled Garden, Sundial, Garden Walls, Bridge And Gatepiers				55°44′24″N 2°24′10″W	Category B	15385	Upload Photo
Marchmont Estate, Stable Courtyard Including Stables House And Squash Court, Former Generator House, Stables, Tower, The Old Coach House And Setted Yard				55°43′44″N 2°24′21″W	Category B	15387	Upload Photo
Marchmont Estate, Adam Bridge				55°43′57″N 2°24′33″W	Category B	15389	Upload Photo
Cheviot View				55°44′38″N 2°24′38″W	Category C(S)	46318	Upload Photo
Marchmont Estate, Redbraes				55°43′44″N 2°24′17″W	Category C(S)	46325	Upload Photo
Marchmont Estate, Walled Garden Including Greenhouses, Potting Sheds And Outer Garden				55°43′43″N 2°24′29″W	Category B	46326	Upload Photo
Packman's Brae, The Old Schoolhouse				55°44′40″N 2°24′22″W	Category C(S)	46328	Upload Photo
Packcman's Brae, Polwarth Crofts Including Steading				55°44′41″N 2°24′27″W	Category B	46329	Upload Photo
Marchmont Estate, Marchmont House Including Garden Walls, Stairs And Sundial				55°43′45″N 2°24′38″W	Category A	15386	Upload Photo
Marchmont Estate, 1 And 2 Marchmont Estate Cottages				55°43′46″N 2°24′16″W	Category C(S)	46324	Upload Photo
Kirk Bridge				55°44′24″N 2°23′42″W	Category C(S)	46319	Upload Photo
Marchmont Estate, Cottages Near Remains Of Redbraes Castle (Nos 1 & 2)				55°43′45″N 2°24′22″W	Category C(S)	46320	Upload Photo
Polwarth Mill Including Ancillary Structures And Garden Walls				55°45′01″N 2°24′58″W	Category C(S)	46330	Upload Photo
Marchmont Estate, Gamekeeper's Cottage Including Kennels				55°43′52″N 2°25′02″W	Category C(S)	46321	Upload Photo
Packman's Brae, Bridge Spanning Polwarth Burn				55°44′44″N 2°24′25″W	Category C(S)	46327	Upload Photo
Polwarth Church, Church Of Scotland, Including Graveyard, Boundary Walls And Gates				55°44′17″N 2°23′59″W	Category A	15384	Upload Photo
Packman's Brae, Thatched Cottage				55°44′43″N 2°24′26″W	Category B	48123	Upload Photo
Marchmont Estate, Dovecot				55°44′30″N 2°23′02″W	Category A	15388	Upload another image
Marchmont Estate, The Kennel House				55°43′47″N 2°24′15″W	Category C(S)	46323	Upload Photo
Marchmont Estate, Ice House				55°43′54″N 2°24′40″W	Category C(S)	46322	Upload Photo

== Key ==
The scheme for classifying buildings in Scotland is:

- Category A: "buildings of national or international importance, either architectural or historic; or fine, little-altered examples of some particular period, style or building type."
- Category B: "buildings of regional or more than local importance; or major examples of some particular period, style or building type, which may have been altered."
- Category C: "buildings of local importance; lesser examples of any period, style, or building type, as originally constructed or moderately altered; and simple traditional buildings which group well with other listed buildings."

In March 2016 there were 47,288 listed buildings in Scotland. Of these, 8% were Category A, and 50% were Category B, with the remaining 42% being Category C.
