= List of listed buildings in Mertoun, Scottish Borders =

This is a list of listed buildings in the parish of Mertoun in the Scottish Borders, Scotland.

== List ==
Name	Location	Date listed	Grid ref. (Note: Sometimes known as OSGB36, the grid reference (where provided) is based on the British national grid reference system used by the Ordnance Survey. • "Guide to National Grid". Ordnance Survey. • "Get-a-map". Ordnance Survey.)	Geo-coordinates	Notes	LB number (Note: Historic Environment Scotland assign a unique alphanumeric identifier to each designated site in Scotland, for listed buildings this always begins with "LB", for example "LB12345".)	Image
Dovecote, Mertoun				55°34′45″N 2°36′14″W	Category A	15112	Upload another image
Wallace Monument And Ornamental Urn, In Policies Of Bemersyde House				55°35′10″N 2°38′58″W	Category B	15122	Upload another image
Old Mertoun House				55°34′47″N 2°36′16″W	Category B	15111	Upload Photo
Dovecot, Dryburgh Abbey House				55°34′31″N 2°38′56″W	Category B	15116	Upload another image
Mertoun Bridge				55°34′50″N 2°37′14″W	Category B	15113	Upload another image See more images
Stirling Tower, Dryburgh				55°34′50″N 2°39′03″W	Category B	15125	Upload another image
West Lodge Gateway, Gladswood				55°36′07″N 2°39′38″W	Category B	15127	Upload another image
Dryburgh, K6 Telephone Kiosk At Post Office				55°34′50″N 2°38′58″W	Category B	19114	Upload Photo
Tomb of Sir Walter Scott, King James obelisk, headstone of Field Marshal Earl Haig and memorials in burial ground to the north of Dryburgh Abbey				55°34′38″N 2°38′58″W	Category A	15114	Upload another image
Temple Of The Muses, Dryburgh Mains				55°34′53″N 2°39′16″W	Category B	15123	Upload another image See more images
Orchard Gate, Dryburgh				55°34′50″N 2°38′58″W	Category B	15124	Upload another image
Old Gladswood House, Gladswood Farm				55°36′08″N 2°39′37″W	Category B	15129	Upload Photo
Mertoun House				55°34′40″N 2°36′27″W	Category A	15110	Upload another image See more images
Dryburgh Abbey House Including Sundial				55°34′34″N 2°38′51″W	Category B	15115	Upload another image
Ice House, Dryburgh Abbey House				55°34′35″N 2°39′01″W	Category B	15118	Upload Photo
Sundial, Bemersyde House				55°35′30″N 2°38′54″W	Category B	15121	Upload another image
Gladswood				55°36′11″N 2°39′09″W	Category B	19714	Upload Photo
Old Corn-Mill, Dryburgh				55°34′34″N 2°38′45″W	Category B	15117	Upload Photo
Mertoun Mill				55°34′56″N 2°37′19″W	Category C(S)	13876	Upload Photo
St Boswell's, Mertoun Glebe				55°35′05″N 2°37′03″W	Category B	49974	Upload Photo
Dryburgh Abbey House Stables				55°34′35″N 2°38′46″W	Category B	19668	Upload Photo
Mertoun Church				55°34′43″N 2°36′41″W	Category B	15108	Upload another image See more images
Old Churchyard				55°34′42″N 2°35′51″W	Category B	15109	Upload Photo
Bemersyde House				55°35′31″N 2°38′55″W	Category A	15120	Upload another image See more images

== Key ==
The scheme for classifying buildings in Scotland is:

- Category A: "buildings of national or international importance, either architectural or historic; or fine, little-altered examples of some particular period, style or building type."
- Category B: "buildings of regional or more than local importance; or major examples of some particular period, style or building type, which may have been altered."
- Category C: "buildings of local importance; lesser examples of any period, style, or building type, as originally constructed or moderately altered; and simple traditional buildings which group well with other listed buildings."

In March 2016 there were 47,288 listed buildings in Scotland. Of these, 8% were Category A, and 50% were Category B, with the remaining 42% being Category C.
