= List of listed buildings in Bunkle And Preston, Scottish Borders =

This is a list of listed buildings in the parish of Bunkle And Preston in the Scottish Borders, Scotland.

== List ==
Name	Location	Date Listed	Grid Ref. (Note: Sometimes known as OSGB36, the grid reference (where provided) is based on the British national grid reference system used by the Ordnance Survey. • "Guide to National Grid". Ordnance Survey. • "Get-a-map". Ordnance Survey.)	Geo-coordinates	Notes	LB Number (Note: Historic Environment Scotland assign a unique alphanumeric identifier to each designated site in Scotland, for listed buildings this always begins with "LB", for example "LB12345".)	Image
Todheugh Bridge				55°48′04″N 2°15′44″W	Category B	176	Upload Photo
Kirkside House (Formerly Bonkyl/Bunkle Manse) Including Garden Walls, Boundary Walls, Gatepiers And Former Stable And Coach House				55°49′43″N 2°18′23″W	Category B	46304	Upload another image
10 Lintlaw Farm Cottage				55°48′57″N 2°16′28″W	Category C(S)	46306	Upload Photo
1, 2, 3, 4 And 5 Preston Farm Cottages Including Cobbled Paths, Boundary Wall And Railings				55°48′32″N 2°19′52″W	Category C(S)	46311	Upload Photo
8 And 9 Preston Farm Cottages				55°48′31″N 2°19′52″W	Category C(S)	46313	Upload Photo
West Blanerne Farmhouse Including Greenhouse, Boundary Walls And Gates				55°47′59″N 2°17′07″W	Category C(S)	46317	Upload Photo
Blanerne Castle (Remains Of)				55°48′01″N 2°16′11″W	Category B	218	Upload Photo
Blanerne House Including Gatepiers				55°48′03″N 2°16′09″W	Category B	219	Upload Photo
Blackhouse Farmhouse Including Boundary Walls, Gatepiers And Gates				55°50′04″N 2°16′45″W	Category C(S)	46299	Upload Photo
Cruxfield House Including Cruxfield Cottage (Former Stable In Part) And Ancillary Structures				55°48′34″N 2°17′56″W	Category B	46303	Upload Photo
6 And 7 Preston Farm Cottages, Now Brockie's Cottage				55°48′31″N 2°19′55″W	Category C(S)	46312	Upload Photo
Preston Church Including Graveyard, Boundary Walls And Gatepiers				55°48′23″N 2°20′30″W	Category B	4118	Upload Photo
5 And 6 Lintlaw Farm Cottages				55°48′56″N 2°16′35″W	Category C(S)	46305	Upload Photo
3 And 5-10 (Inclusive) Primrosehill Farm Cottages Including Ancillary Structure				55°48′38″N 2°20′42″W	Category C(S)	46314	Upload Photo
Primrosehill Farmhouse Including Ancillary Structure, Garden Walls, Boundary Walls And Gate				55°48′42″N 2°20′55″W	Category C(S)	46315	Upload Photo
Bunkle Old Kirk In Bonkyl Church Graveyard, Including Railings				55°49′45″N 2°18′26″W	Category A	4121	Upload Photo
Bonkyl Church (Church Of Scotland) Including Graveyard, Boundary Walls, Quadrant Walls, Gatepiers And Gates				55°49′45″N 2°18′25″W	Category B	216	Upload another image
Lintlaw School (Former) Including Ancillary Structure And Boundary Walls				55°49′00″N 2°16′36″W	Category C(S)	46307	Upload Photo
Preston Bridge				55°48′14″N 2°20′28″W	Category A	4120	Upload another image
Billiemains Farmhouse Including Boundary Walls				55°49′18″N 2°14′16″W	Category C(S)	46298	Upload Photo
Marygold Farmhouse Including Ancillary Structure, Boundary Walls, Gatepiers And Setted Courtyard				55°50′00″N 2°18′00″W	Category C(S)	46309	Upload Photo
Nel Logan's Bridge				55°48′27″N 2°19′32″W	Category B	214	Upload Photo
Marygold Farm Steading Including Boundary Walls				55°50′04″N 2°18′04″W	Category C(S)	46308	Upload Photo
Mayfield Farmhouse Including Ancillary Structures, Boundary Walls And Garden Walls				55°50′15″N 2°15′56″W	Category C(S)	46310	Upload Photo
Bonkyl Lodge, Gate Lodge				55°48′36″N 2°19′38″W	Category C(S)	46301	Upload Photo
Blanerne House, Walled Garden				55°48′07″N 2°16′01″W	Category C(S)	46300	Upload Photo
Bonkyl Lodge, Walled Garden				55°48′29″N 2°19′28″W	Category C(S)	46302	Upload Photo
Slighhouses Farmhouse Including Garden Walls				55°49′36″N 2°17′09″W	Category C(S)	46316	Upload Photo

== Key ==
The scheme for classifying buildings in Scotland is:

- Category A: "buildings of national or international importance, either architectural or historic; or fine, little-altered examples of some particular period, style or building type."
- Category B: "buildings of regional or more than local importance; or major examples of some particular period, style or building type, which may have been altered."
- Category C: "buildings of local importance; lesser examples of any period, style, or building type, as originally constructed or moderately altered; and simple traditional buildings which group well with other listed buildings."

In March 2016 there were 47,288 listed buildings in Scotland. Of these, 8% were Category A, and 50% were Category B, with the remaining 42% being Category C.
