= List of listed buildings in Ancrum, Scottish Borders =

This is a list of listed buildings in the parish of Ancrum in the Scottish Borders, Scotland.

== List ==
Name	Location	Date Listed	Grid Ref. (Note: Sometimes known as OSGB36, the grid reference (where provided) is based on the British national grid reference system used by the Ordnance Survey. • "Guide to National Grid". Ordnance Survey. • "Get-a-map". Ordnance Survey.)	Geo-coordinates	Notes	LB Number (Note: Historic Environment Scotland assign a unique alphanumeric identifier to each designated site in Scotland, for listed buildings this always begins with "LB", for example "LB12345".)	Image
Gate-Lodge, Kirklands				55°30′54″N 2°36′13″W	Category C(S)	4179	Upload Photo
Old Bridge Near Churchyard Leading To Lintmill				55°30′58″N 2°36′00″W	Category B	4240	Upload another image
Ancrum Village, The Green, Smithy Cottage, Also Known As Sunnyside Cottage				55°30′50″N 2°35′23″W	Category C(S)	6359	Upload another image
New Ancrum Bridge				55°30′22″N 2°34′21″W	Category B	4223	Upload Photo
Dovecote, Pinnacle				55°31′20″N 2°38′55″W	Category B	4224	Upload Photo
Rawflat				55°30′52″N 2°39′56″W	Category B	4225	Upload another image
Kirklands				55°31′05″N 2°36′12″W	Category B	4178	Upload Photo
Ancrum, Greenmount				55°30′50″N 2°35′25″W	Category C(S)	226	Upload Photo
Ancrum, South View				55°30′50″N 2°35′24″W	Category C(S)	228	Upload Photo
Ale Bridge				55°30′49″N 2°34′56″W	Category B	4222	Upload Photo
Ancrum Village, The Cross Keys				55°30′50″N 2°35′25″W	Category C(S)	225	Upload Photo
Chesters House				55°29′41″N 2°37′17″W	Category A	4174	Upload another image
Monteath Douglas Mausoleum				55°32′01″N 2°36′54″W	Category B	4175	Upload another image
Ancrum, Market Cross				55°30′49″N 2°35′25″W	Category B	221	Upload Photo
Old Ancrum Bridge				55°30′22″N 2°34′25″W	Category A	224	Upload another image
Remains Of Old Ancrum Church				55°30′58″N 2°36′03″W	Category B	4239	Upload another image See more images
Ancrum, Green View				55°30′50″N 2°35′26″W	Category C(S)	227	Upload Photo

== Key ==
The scheme for classifying buildings in Scotland is:

- Category A: "buildings of national or international importance, either architectural or historic; or fine, little-altered examples of some particular period, style or building type."
- Category B: "buildings of regional or more than local importance; or major examples of some particular period, style or building type, which may have been altered."
- Category C: "buildings of local importance; lesser examples of any period, style, or building type, as originally constructed or moderately altered; and simple traditional buildings which group well with other listed buildings."

In March 2016 there were 47,288 listed buildings in Scotland. Of these, 8% were Category A, and 50% were Category B, with the remaining 42% being Category C.
