= List of listed buildings in Stichill, Scottish Borders =

This is a list of listed buildings in the parish of Stichill in the Scottish Borders, Scotland.

== List ==
Name	Location	Date Listed	Grid Ref. (Note: Sometimes known as OSGB36, the grid reference (where provided) is based on the British national grid reference system used by the Ordnance Survey. • "Guide to National Grid". Ordnance Survey. • "Get-a-map". Ordnance Survey.)	Geo-coordinates	Notes	LB Number (Note: Historic Environment Scotland assign a unique alphanumeric identifier to each designated site in Scotland, for listed buildings this always begins with "LB", for example "LB12345".)	Image
War Memorial, Stichill Village				55°38′19″N 2°27′28″W	Category C(S)	19626	Upload Photo
Baird Cottages, Stichill Village				55°38′18″N 2°27′33″W	Category B	19623	Upload Photo
Parish Church And Graveyard				55°38′14″N 2°27′38″W	Category B	15083	Upload Photo
Stichill, Gateway To Former Stichill Park				55°38′16″N 2°27′37″W	Category C(S)	15084	Upload Photo
Stichill, Eildon View (Formerly Stichill Lodge)				55°38′16″N 2°27′38″W	Category C(S)	51015	Upload Photo
Former United Presbyterian Church And Boundary Wall, Stichill Village				55°38′19″N 2°27′26″W	Category C(S)	19624	Upload Photo
Hawthorn Cottage, Stichill Village				55°38′18″N 2°27′27″W	Category B	19625	Upload Photo

== Key ==
The scheme for classifying buildings in Scotland is:

- Category A: "buildings of national or international importance, either architectural or historic; or fine, little-altered examples of some particular period, style or building type."
- Category B: "buildings of regional or more than local importance; or major examples of some particular period, style or building type, which may have been altered."
- Category C: "buildings of local importance; lesser examples of any period, style, or building type, as originally constructed or moderately altered; and simple traditional buildings which group well with other listed buildings."

In March 2016 there were 47,288 listed buildings in Scotland. Of these, 8% were Category A, and 50% were Category B, with the remaining 42% being Category C.
