= List of listed buildings in Langton, Scottish Borders =

This is a list of listed buildings in the parish of Langton in the Scottish Borders, Scotland.

== List ==
Name	Location	Date Listed	Grid Ref. (Note: Sometimes known as OSGB36, the grid reference (where provided) is based on the British national grid reference system used by the Ordnance Survey. • "Guide to National Grid". Ordnance Survey. • "Get-a-map". Ordnance Survey.)	Geo-coordinates	Notes	LB Number (Note: Historic Environment Scotland assign a unique alphanumeric identifier to each designated site in Scotland, for listed buildings this always begins with "LB", for example "LB12345".)	Image
Gavinton, North Street, Cheadle, Post Office				55°45′44″N 2°22′18″W	Category C(S)	42576	Upload Photo
Gavinton, North Street, Hillview				55°45′46″N 2°22′11″W	Category C(S)	42578	Upload Photo
Gavinton, South Street, Iona Cottage				55°45′44″N 2°22′06″W	Category C(S)	42596	Upload Photo
Gavinton, Gavinton Parish Church, Church Of Scotland				55°45′46″N 2°22′23″W	Category B	42570	Upload Photo
Gavinton, The Green, Grenville And Former Bakery				55°45′44″N 2°22′18″W	Category C(S)	42572	Upload Photo
Gavinton, The Green, Wellcroft				55°45′43″N 2°22′18″W	Category C(S)	42574	Upload Photo
Gavinton, North Street, Jubilee Cottages				55°45′45″N 2°22′14″W	Category C(S)	42579	Upload Photo
Gavinton, North Street, Myrtle Cottage And Sparrow Croft				55°45′43″N 2°22′21″W	Category C(S)	42582	Upload Photo
Gavinton, South Street, Butterwell And Southview				55°45′41″N 2°22′19″W	Category C(S)	42589	Upload Photo
Gavinton, South Street, Woodville				55°45′44″N 2°22′06″W	Category C(S)	42599	Upload Photo
The Hardens Farmhouse And Steading				55°46′46″N 2°23′42″W	Category B	42600	Upload Photo
The Hardens, Farm Workers' Cottages				55°46′41″N 2°23′43″W	Category C(S)	42601	Upload Photo
Gavinton, North Street, Langrig				55°45′44″N 2°22′17″W	Category C(S)	42580	Upload Photo
Gavinton, South Street, Edenside				55°45′43″N 2°22′10″W	Category C(S)	42591	Upload Photo
Langton, Kennelman's House				55°46′06″N 2°23′23″W	Category B	42602	Upload Photo
Langton, Langton Mains				55°46′05″N 2°22′59″W	Category B	42604	Upload Photo
Langton, Principal Gate				55°46′08″N 2°22′19″W	Category B	42606	Upload Photo
Langton, Walled Garden				55°46′04″N 2°23′02″W	Category B	42609	Upload Photo
Gavinton, South Street, Butterwell Tigh And Butterwell Tigh West, Terrace Adjacent To Butterwell Hall				55°45′43″N 2°22′12″W	Category C(S)	42590	Upload Photo
Gavinton, South Street, Eden House				55°45′43″N 2°22′11″W	Category C(S)	42593	Upload Photo
Gavinton, South Street, Water Pump				55°45′44″N 2°22′07″W	Category C(S)	42598	Upload Photo
Woodend, House And Steading				55°45′24″N 2°23′04″W	Category B	42611	Upload Photo
Langton, St Cuthbert's Churchyard				55°45′56″N 2°22′48″W	Category B	13682	Upload Photo
Langton, Kennels				55°46′07″N 2°23′26″W	Category C(S)	42603	Upload Photo
Langton, North Lodge				55°46′09″N 2°22′21″W	Category C(S)	42605	Upload Photo
Langton, Terrace Lodge				55°45′50″N 2°22′34″W	Category B	42608	Upload Photo
Raecleugh Head				55°46′08″N 2°24′16″W	Category B	42610	Upload Photo
Gavinton, The Green/ South Street, Cheviot View, Boundary Wall And Gatepier				55°45′42″N 2°22′16″W	Category C(S)	42571	Upload Photo
Gavinton, The Green, Meadow View				55°45′44″N 2°22′13″W	Category C(S)	42573	Upload Photo
Gavinton, North Street, Old School House				55°45′44″N 2°22′17″W	Category C(S)	42585	Upload Photo
Gavinton, North Street, School House With Boundary Walls, Railing, Gates And Gatepiers				55°45′46″N 2°22′16″W	Category C(S)	42586	Upload Photo
Gavinton, North Street, Victoria Lodge				55°45′46″N 2°22′11″W	Category C(S)	42587	Upload Photo
Gavinton, South Street, Newhaven Cottage				55°45′43″N 2°22′09″W	Category C(S)	42588	Upload Photo
Gavinton, South Street, Eden Cottage				55°45′43″N 2°22′10″W	Category C(S)	42592	Upload Photo
Gavinton, South Street, Fern Cottage				55°45′44″N 2°22′09″W	Category C(S)	42594	Upload Photo
Gavinton, South Street, Gavinton Hall And Butterwell Hall				55°45′43″N 2°22′12″W	Category C(S)	42595	Upload Photo
Gavinton, South Street, Rose Cottage				55°45′44″N 2°22′06″W	Category C(S)	42597	Upload Photo
Gavinton, North Street, Campbell Lodge				55°45′45″N 2°22′12″W	Category C(S)	42575	Upload Photo
Gavinton, North Street, Hawthorn Cottage				55°45′45″N 2°22′16″W	Category C(S)	42577	Upload Photo
Gavinton, North Street, Langton House (Former Manse), Boundary Walls And Outbuildings				55°45′47″N 2°22′06″W	Category B	42581	Upload Photo
Gavinton, North Street, The Old Manse/Woodside				55°45′43″N 2°22′27″W	Category B	42584	Upload Photo
Gavinton, North Street, Norwood				55°45′46″N 2°22′10″W	Category C(S)	42583	Upload Photo

== Key ==
The scheme for classifying buildings in Scotland is:

- Category A: "buildings of national or international importance, either architectural or historic; or fine, little-altered examples of some particular period, style or building type."
- Category B: "buildings of regional or more than local importance; or major examples of some particular period, style or building type, which may have been altered."
- Category C: "buildings of local importance; lesser examples of any period, style, or building type, as originally constructed or moderately altered; and simple traditional buildings which group well with other listed buildings."

In March 2016 there were 47,288 listed buildings in Scotland. Of these, 8% were Category A, and 50% were Category B, with the remaining 42% being Category C.
