= List of listed buildings in Drumelzier, Scottish Borders =

This is a list of listed buildings in the parish of Drumelzier in the Scottish Borders, Scotland.

== List ==
Name	Location	Date Listed	Grid Ref. (Note: Sometimes known as OSGB36, the grid reference (where provided) is based on the British national grid reference system used by the Ordnance Survey. • "Guide to National Grid". Ordnance Survey. • "Get-a-map". Ordnance Survey.)	Geo-coordinates	Notes	LB Number (Note: Historic Environment Scotland assign a unique alphanumeric identifier to each designated site in Scotland, for listed buildings this always begins with "LB", for example "LB12345".)	Image
Tinnis Castle				55°35′46″N 3°21′50″W	Category B	2010	Upload Photo
Bellspool Cottages Bellspool				55°36′13″N 3°20′02″W	Category B	2018	Upload Photo
Drumelzier Parish Church And Graveyard				55°35′42″N 3°22′28″W	Category B	2032	Upload Photo
Polmood Bridge				55°31′44″N 3°24′26″W	Category C(S)	43851	Upload Photo
Dawyck House				55°36′13″N 3°19′15″W	Category B	2013	Upload Photo
Wester Dawyck				55°36′04″N 3°20′27″W	Category B	2019	Upload Photo
Garden Cottage Bellspool				55°36′12″N 3°19′57″W	Category B	2017	Upload Photo
Drumelzier Village, Corner Of Road Leading To Church, Smithy Cottage And Adjacent Cottages				55°35′38″N 3°22′23″W	Category B	2034	Upload Photo
Drumelzier Castle				55°35′14″N 3°23′28″W	Category B	2011	Upload Photo
Lodge At Main Entrance To Dawyck Policies				55°36′13″N 3°19′47″W	Category B	2015	Upload Photo
Stanhope Farm House (Easter)				55°33′13″N 3°23′35″W	Category B	2012	Upload Photo
Chapel In Dawyck Policies				55°36′03″N 3°19′19″W	Category B	2014	Upload Photo
Dawyck Stables, Bellspool				55°36′11″N 3°19′53″W	Category C(S)	2016	Upload Photo
Tinnis House (Formerly Drumelzier)				55°35′40″N 3°22′27″W	Category C(S)	2033	Upload Photo

== Key ==
The scheme for classifying buildings in Scotland is:

- Category A: "buildings of national or international importance, either architectural or historic; or fine, little-altered examples of some particular period, style or building type."
- Category B: "buildings of regional or more than local importance; or major examples of some particular period, style or building type, which may have been altered."
- Category C: "buildings of local importance; lesser examples of any period, style, or building type, as originally constructed or moderately altered; and simple traditional buildings which group well with other listed buildings."

In March 2016 there were 47,288 listed buildings in Scotland. Of these, 8% were Category A, and 50% were Category B, with the remaining 42% being Category C.
