= List of listed buildings in Ladykirk, Scottish Borders =

This is a list of listed buildings in the parish of Ladykirk in the Scottish Borders, Scotland.

== List ==
Name	Location	Date Listed	Grid Ref. (Note: Sometimes known as OSGB36, the grid reference (where provided) is based on the British national grid reference system used by the Ordnance Survey. • "Guide to National Grid". Ordnance Survey. • "Get-a-map". Ordnance Survey.)	Geo-coordinates	Notes	LB Number (Note: Historic Environment Scotland assign a unique alphanumeric identifier to each designated site in Scotland, for listed buildings this always begins with "LB", for example "LB12345".)	Image
Stables And Riding School				55°42′29″N 2°11′03″W	Category B	8350	Upload Photo
Upsettlington, Ladykirk House, North Lodge, Gates And Gatepiers				55°42′37″N 2°11′05″W	Category C(S)	10789	Upload Photo
West Lodge Ladykirk				55°42′09″N 2°12′03″W	Category A	8351	Upload another image
St Mary's Church Ladykirk				55°43′20″N 2°10′43″W	Category A	8349	Upload Photo
Ladykirk And Norham Bridge				55°43′08″N 2°10′36″W	Category B	8352	Upload Photo

== Key ==
The scheme for classifying buildings in Scotland is:

- Category A: "buildings of national or international importance, either architectural or historic; or fine, little-altered examples of some particular period, style or building type."
- Category B: "buildings of regional or more than local importance; or major examples of some particular period, style or building type, which may have been altered."
- Category C: "buildings of local importance; lesser examples of any period, style, or building type, as originally constructed or moderately altered; and simple traditional buildings which group well with other listed buildings."

In March 2016 there were 47,288 listed buildings in Scotland. Of these, 8% were Category A, and 50% were Category B, with the remaining 42% being Category C.
