= List of listed buildings in Lilliesleaf, Scottish Borders =

This is a list of listed buildings in the parish of Lilliesleaf in the Scottish Borders, Scotland.

== List ==
Name	Location	Date Listed	Grid Ref. (Note: Sometimes known as OSGB36, the grid reference (where provided) is based on the British national grid reference system used by the Ordnance Survey. • "Guide to National Grid". Ordnance Survey. • "Get-a-map". Ordnance Survey.)	Geo-coordinates	Notes	LB Number (Note: Historic Environment Scotland assign a unique alphanumeric identifier to each designated site in Scotland, for listed buildings this always begins with "LB", for example "LB12345".)	Image
Lilliesleaf Village, Cockspurs				55°31′05″N 2°44′15″W	Category C(S)	8199	Upload Photo
Deer Larder, Riddell				55°30′44″N 2°46′00″W	Category B	8202	Upload another image
Stables, Riddell				55°30′41″N 2°46′01″W	Category B	8201	Upload Photo
Bewlie Old Farm, Bewlie Orchard				55°31′31″N 2°41′48″W	Category B	43267	Upload Photo
Bewlie House With Terrace, Garden Walls And Gates				55°31′36″N 2°41′49″W	Category B	12944	Upload another image
Lilliesleaf Church Of Scotland Kirk Graveyard, Walls And Gravestones				55°31′09″N 2°43′51″W	Category B	49293	Upload Photo
Clerklands				55°30′51″N 2°47′15″W	Category B	13672	Upload Photo
Riddell				55°30′45″N 2°45′58″W	Category B	13669	Upload another image
Lilliesleaf Church Of Scotland Kirk Including Boundary Walls, Gatepiers And Gates				55°31′10″N 2°43′53″W	Category B	8197	Upload another image See more images
Park Bridge, Riddell				55°30′36″N 2°45′51″W	Category B	8209	Upload another image
Riddell Policies, Mausoleum Including Boundary Wall, Railings And Gates				55°30′53″N 2°45′42″W	Category B	8212	Upload another image
Riddell Policies, Park Bridge (North)				55°30′42″N 2°45′55″W	Category C(S)	8210	Upload another image
Manse				55°31′09″N 2°44′11″W	Category B	8198	Upload Photo
The Riddell Policies, General's Tower				55°30′55″N 2°45′41″W	Category B	8211	Upload another image See more images
Lilliesleaf Village, Viola Cottage				55°31′06″N 2°44′11″W	Category C(S)	8200	Upload Photo

== Key ==
The scheme for classifying buildings in Scotland is:

- Category A: "buildings of national or international importance, either architectural or historic; or fine, little-altered examples of some particular period, style or building type."
- Category B: "buildings of regional or more than local importance; or major examples of some particular period, style or building type, which may have been altered."
- Category C: "buildings of local importance; lesser examples of any period, style, or building type, as originally constructed or moderately altered; and simple traditional buildings which group well with other listed buildings."

In March 2016 there were 47,288 listed buildings in Scotland. Of these, 8% were Category A, and 50% were Category B, with the remaining 42% being Category C.
