= List of listed buildings in Chirnside, Scottish Borders =

This is a list of listed buildings in the parish of Chirnside in the Scottish Borders, Scotland.

== List ==
Name	Location	Date Listed	Grid Ref. (Note: Sometimes known as OSGB36, the grid reference (where provided) is based on the British national grid reference system used by the Ordnance Survey. • "Guide to National Grid". Ordnance Survey. • "Get-a-map". Ordnance Survey.)	Geo-coordinates	Notes	LB Number (Note: Historic Environment Scotland assign a unique alphanumeric identifier to each designated site in Scotland, for listed buildings this always begins with "LB", for example "LB12345".)	Image
Ninewells Dovecot				55°47′55″N 2°12′32″W	Category A	4124	Upload Photo
Chirnside, Kirkgate, The Old Manse, Formerly Glebe House				55°47′56″N 2°12′40″W	Category B	178	Upload Photo
Blackburn Farm, Former Farm Cottages (Derelict)				55°49′18″N 2°10′48″W	Category C(S)	46339	Upload Photo
Chirnside, Main Street East End, Leaside				55°48′09″N 2°12′30″W	Category C(S)	46347	Upload Photo
Chirnside, Waterloo Arms Hotel				55°47′48″N 2°12′38″W	Category C(S)	46352	Upload Photo
Maines Farmhouse Including Boundary Walls				55°48′08″N 2°11′32″W	Category C(S)	46359	Upload Photo
Maines South Lodge Including Boundary Wall				55°48′02″N 2°11′16″W	Category C(S)	46361	Upload Photo
Whitehall Stables				55°47′20″N 2°12′05″W	Category B	46363	Upload Photo
Whitehall Dovecot				55°47′25″N 2°12′16″W	Category B	181	Upload Photo
Chirnside, Kirkgate, Braemar				55°47′51″N 2°12′38″W	Category C(S)	46344	Upload Photo
1-4 (Inclusive Nos) Edington Mill Cottages				55°47′15″N 2°10′23″W	Category C(S)	46357	Upload Photo
Ninewells Walled Garden				55°47′35″N 2°12′51″W	Category C(S)	46362	Upload Photo
Chirnside, Chirnside Primary School Including Playsheds, Boundary Walls, Quadrant Walls, Gates And Gatepiers				55°47′53″N 2°12′25″W	Category A	6620	Upload another image
Chirnside, 2 Kirkgate (To N Of Kirkgate Cottage) Including Post Box				55°47′50″N 2°12′37″W	Category C(S)	46343	Upload Photo
Chirnside, Main Street East End, Smithy House				55°48′12″N 2°11′55″W	Category C(S)	46349	Upload Photo
Chirnside, Main Street West End, Elm Bank (Former Ninewells School And School House) Including Ancillary Structure, Boundary Wall, Gatepiers And Gate				55°48′03″N 2°13′06″W	Category C(S)	46351	Upload Photo
Chirnside Station (Former)				55°48′15″N 2°14′14″W	Category C(S)	46355	Upload Photo
Edington Mill (Former) Including Bridge, Lade And Cauld				55°47′14″N 2°10′14″W	Category B	6581	Upload Photo
Chirnside, Kirkgate, The Old Bakery Including Bakery Building, Ancillary Structure, Boundary Walls, Railings And Gates				55°47′52″N 2°12′37″W	Category B	46345	Upload Photo
Chirnside, Main Street East End, Field House Including Ancillary Wing And Boundary Wall				55°48′11″N 2°12′01″W	Category C(S)	46346	Upload Photo
Chirnside, Waterloo Cottage Including Boundary Wall				55°47′48″N 2°12′37″W	Category C(S)	46353	Upload Photo
Edington Mill Cottage Including Garden Walls And Railings				55°47′15″N 2°10′24″W	Category C(S)	46356	Upload Photo
Harelaw Farm Steading				55°48′45″N 2°11′59″W	Category C(S)	46358	Upload Photo
Edington Mains Farmhouse Including Ancillary Structure, Boundary Walls And Gatepiers				55°47′35″N 2°09′56″W	Category B	4125	Upload Photo
Whitehall House Including Ancillary Structure (Former Gas House), Walled Garden And Gatepiers				55°47′18″N 2°12′12″W	Category B	180	Upload Photo
Chirnside, Crosshill, Chirnside Community Centre (Former Chirnside North Church) Including Ancillary Block And Boundary Wall				55°48′08″N 2°12′33″W	Category C(S)	46340	Upload Photo
Chirnside, Crosshill, Jesmond Cottage Including Boundary Walls And Gatepiers				55°50′33″N 2°07′26″W	Category C(S)	46341	Upload Photo
Chirnside Hall Hotel, Formerly Maines House, Including Ancillary Structures, Iron Railings, Courtyard Wall And Gatepiers				55°48′12″N 2°11′15″W	Category B	46354	Upload Photo
Maines House Walled Garden Including Greenhouses, Gatepiers And Gates				55°48′15″N 2°11′11″W	Category B	46360	Upload Photo
Chirnside, Herbert Villa Including Boundary Wall				55°47′50″N 2°12′41″W	Category C(S)	46342	Upload Photo
Chirnside, Main Street West End, Crofts House Including Garage And Boundary Walls				55°48′08″N 2°12′42″W	Category C(S)	46350	Upload Photo
Chirnside, Main Street East End, Lochiel Including Boundary Walls, Piers And Gatepiers				55°48′09″N 2°12′27″W	Category C(S)	46348	Upload Photo
Chirnside, Kirkgate, Chirnside Parish Church (Church Of Scotland) Including Graveyard, Mort-House, War Memorial, Boundary Walls, Gatepiers, Quadrant Walls, Memorial Gateway And Gates				55°47′51″N 2°12′34″W	Category B	4122	Upload Photo
Chirnside, Kirkgate, Brewery House Including Ancillary Structure, Cobbled Courtyard, Boundary Walls, Gatepiers And Gate				55°47′50″N 2°12′39″W	Category B	4123	Upload Photo

== Key ==
The scheme for classifying buildings in Scotland is:

- Category A: "buildings of national or international importance, either architectural or historic; or fine, little-altered examples of some particular period, style or building type."
- Category B: "buildings of regional or more than local importance; or major examples of some particular period, style or building type, which may have been altered."
- Category C: "buildings of local importance; lesser examples of any period, style, or building type, as originally constructed or moderately altered; and simple traditional buildings which group well with other listed buildings."

In March 2016 there were 47,288 listed buildings in Scotland. Of these, 8% were Category A, and 50% were Category B, with the remaining 42% being Category C.
