= List of listed buildings in Legerwood, Scottish Borders =

This is a list of listed buildings in the parish of Legerwood in the Scottish Borders, Scotland.

== List ==
Name	Location	Date Listed	Grid Ref. (Note: Sometimes known as OSGB36, the grid reference (where provided) is based on the British national grid reference system used by the Ordnance Survey. • "Guide to National Grid". Ordnance Survey. • "Get-a-map". Ordnance Survey.)	Geo-coordinates	Notes	LB Number (Note: Historic Environment Scotland assign a unique alphanumeric identifier to each designated site in Scotland, for listed buildings this always begins with "LB", for example "LB12345".)	Image
Old Bridge, Galadean				55°40′48″N 2°42′10″W	Category B	8161	Upload Photo
Ledgerwood Church And Churchyard				55°40′57″N 2°38′50″W	Category B	8188	Upload Photo
Birkhill				55°40′26″N 2°41′43″W	Category B	8162	Upload Photo
Corsbie Castle				55°41′11″N 2°37′33″W	Category B	8189	Upload Photo
Dod Mill				55°43′27″N 2°40′08″W	Category B	6729	Upload Photo
Corsbie Farmhouse				55°41′22″N 2°37′37″W	Category B	8190	Upload Photo

== Key ==
The scheme for classifying buildings in Scotland is:

- Category A: "buildings of national or international importance, either architectural or historic; or fine, little-altered examples of some particular period, style or building type."
- Category B: "buildings of regional or more than local importance; or major examples of some particular period, style or building type, which may have been altered."
- Category C: "buildings of local importance; lesser examples of any period, style, or building type, as originally constructed or moderately altered; and simple traditional buildings which group well with other listed buildings."

In March 2016 there were 47,288 listed buildings in Scotland. Of these, 8% were Category A, and 50% were Category B, with the remaining 42% being Category C.
