= List of listed buildings in Whitsome, Scottish Borders =

This is a list of listed buildings in the parish of Whitsome in the Scottish Borders, Scotland.

== List ==
Name	Location	Date Listed	Grid Ref. (Note: Sometimes known as OSGB36, the grid reference (where provided) is based on the British national grid reference system used by the Ordnance Survey. • "Guide to National Grid". Ordnance Survey. • "Get-a-map". Ordnance Survey.)	Geo-coordinates	Notes	LB Number (Note: Historic Environment Scotland assign a unique alphanumeric identifier to each designated site in Scotland, for listed buildings this always begins with "LB", for example "LB12345".)	Image
The Laws Cottage				55°44′59″N 2°16′04″W	Category C(S)	44734	Upload Photo
Main Street, Madera Cottage				55°44′57″N 2°12′56″W	Category C(S)	44737	Upload Photo
Whitsome Lea Including Outbuildings, Boundary Walls And Gatepiers				55°44′47″N 2°13′36″W	Category C(S)	44743	Upload Photo
3-7 (Inclusive Nos) Winfield Farm Cottages Including Outbuildings And Garden Wall				55°45′10″N 2°10′00″W	Category C(S)	44746	Upload Photo
Hilton Including Walled Garden, Outbuilding, Boundary Wall And Gatepiers				55°45′00″N 2°11′29″W	Category B	44731	Upload Photo
Leetside Farmhouse Including Boundary Walls				55°45′17″N 2°13′00″W	Category B	44735	Upload Photo
3 And 4 Main Street				55°44′57″N 2°12′58″W	Category C(S)	44736	Upload Photo
West Newton Farmhouse				55°44′13″N 2°14′54″W	Category C(S)	44741	Upload Photo
1-7 (Inclusive Nos) Whitsome Hill Farm Cottages				55°44′16″N 2°13′16″W	Category C(S)	44742	Upload Photo
Winfield Farm, Cartshed And Former Granary				55°45′11″N 2°10′02″W	Category B	44745	Upload Photo
Ravelaw Farmhouse (Formerly Langrigg) Including Outbuildings, Walled Garden And Boundary Walls				55°44′52″N 2°14′28″W	Category C(S)	17425	Upload Photo
Eaglehall Including Boundary Wall, Railings And Gate				55°44′51″N 2°12′19″W	Category C(S)	44730	Upload Photo
Whitsome, Old Churchyard, Including Watch House				55°44′47″N 2°11′21″W	Category C(S)	19801	Upload Photo
Main Street, Vulcan Cottage Including Former Smithy, Boundary Wall, Railings And Gate				55°45′00″N 2°12′50″W	Category C(S)	44740	Upload Photo
Jardinefield Farmhouse Including Entrance Walls And Gates				55°44′34″N 2°12′00″W	Category C(S)	44732	Upload Photo
Winfield Farmhouse Including Outbuilding, Entrance Walls And Gatepiers				55°45′03″N 2°10′04″W	Category C(S)	44744	Upload Photo
The Laws				55°44′57″N 2°16′18″W	Category C(S)	44733	Upload Photo
Main Street, View Holloa Including Outbuilding				55°44′58″N 2°12′55″W	Category C(S)	44738	Upload Photo
Main Street, Ewart House				55°44′58″N 2°12′54″W	Category C(S)	44739	Upload Photo
Whitsome Kirk, Including Boundary Walls, Gatepiers And Gates				55°44′51″N 2°13′26″W	Category C(S)	17423	Upload Photo

== Key ==
The scheme for classifying buildings in Scotland is:

- Category A: "buildings of national or international importance, either architectural or historic; or fine, little-altered examples of some particular period, style or building type."
- Category B: "buildings of regional or more than local importance; or major examples of some particular period, style or building type, which may have been altered."
- Category C: "buildings of local importance; lesser examples of any period, style, or building type, as originally constructed or moderately altered; and simple traditional buildings which group well with other listed buildings."

In March 2016 there were 47,288 listed buildings in Scotland. Of these, 8% were Category A, and 50% were Category B, with the remaining 42% being Category C.
