= List of listed buildings in Eccles, Scottish Borders =

This is a list of listed buildings in the parish of Eccles in the Scottish Borders, Scotland.

== List ==
Name	Location	Date Listed	Grid Ref. (Note: Sometimes known as OSGB36, the grid reference (where provided) is based on the British national grid reference system used by the Ordnance Survey. • "Guide to National Grid". Ordnance Survey. • "Get-a-map". Ordnance Survey.)	Geo-coordinates	Notes	LB Number (Note: Historic Environment Scotland assign a unique alphanumeric identifier to each designated site in Scotland, for listed buildings this always begins with "LB", for example "LB12345".)	Image
Belchester, Walled Garden Including Greenhouse, Garden Seat, Sundial And Potting Shed				55°41′01″N 2°19′46″W	Category C(S)	45863	Upload Photo
Birgham, Springhill Gardener's Cottage And Former Stable Range Including Cobbled Courtyard				55°38′33″N 2°20′34″W	Category C(S)	45866	Upload Photo
The Braw Bothy, Stablegate Cottage And Stables, (Formerly To Eccles House), Including Cobbled Path, Ancillary Structures, Boundary Wall, Quadrant Walls And Gatepiers				55°39′51″N 2°22′33″W	Category B	45867	Upload Photo
Eccles House Including Service Wing, Ancillary Structures, Summer House, Boundary Walls, Quadrant Walls, Piers, Gatepiers And Gates				55°39′48″N 2°22′37″W	Category B	45872	Upload Photo
Eccles Tofts Farmhouse Including Garden Walls, Quadrant Walls, Piers And Gatepiers				55°41′56″N 2°23′23″W	Category B	45879	Upload Photo
Harlaw Farmhouse				55°39′26″N 2°24′25″W	Category B	45880	Upload Photo
Springwells Old Farmhouse Including Garden Wall				55°41′07″N 2°22′22″W	Category C(S)	45903	Upload Photo
Stainrigg House Including Stables, Little Stainrigg (Former Groom's Cottage), Kennels, Cobbled Courtyard, Courtyard Walls And Gatepiers				55°41′11″N 2°20′59″W	Category B	45905	Upload Photo
Eccles House, St Mary's Convent (Remains Of)				55°39′52″N 2°22′39″W	Category C(S)	4077	Upload Photo
Kames Stables Including Cobbled Courtyard To Front And Ancillary Structures (Further Stable Range And Barn With Hayloft) To Rear				55°42′06″N 2°20′59″W	Category B	4116	Upload Photo
Belchester, Stable Block Including Groom's Cottage, Ancillary Structures, Courtyard Walls And Gatepiers				55°41′08″N 2°19′41″W	Category B	45862	Upload Photo
Bughtrig, West Lodge Including Entrance Walls, Piers And Gatepiers				55°41′40″N 2°19′38″W	Category C(S)	45869	Upload Photo
Eccles, Glebe House (Former Manse) Including Stables, Boundary Walls, Quadrant Walls And Gatepiers				55°40′04″N 2°22′23″W	Category B	45871	Upload Photo
Eccles House, Walled Garden Including Greenhouses				55°39′53″N 2°22′44″W	Category C(S)	45874	Upload Photo
Langrig Farmhouse				55°42′00″N 2°18′49″W	Category C(S)	45887	Upload Photo
Loanknowe Farmhouse Including Boundary Walls, Mounting Stone, Gatepiers And Gate				55°39′59″N 2°24′15″W	Category B	45895	Upload Photo
Mersington House Including Stable Block, Garden Walls, Boundary Walls, Quadrant Walls And Gatepiers				55°41′29″N 2°21′31″W	Category B	45897	Upload Photo
Ploughlands				55°41′19″N 2°23′20″W	Category C(S)	45900	Upload Photo
Stainrigg, April Cottage				55°41′15″N 2°20′52″W	Category C(S)	45904	Upload Photo
West Printonan, Threshing Barn And Cartshed And Granary				55°42′33″N 2°20′58″W	Category B	45910	Upload Photo
Anton's Hill House				55°41′02″N 2°20′34″W	Category B	6639	Upload Photo
Eccles Church (Church Of Scotland) Including Graveyard, Mounting Stone, Boundary Walls And Gatepiers				55°39′53″N 2°22′37″W	Category B	4076	Upload another image See more images
Anton's Hill, Quadrant Walls, Outer Walls And Piers Adjacent To North Lodge				55°41′10″N 2°20′43″W	Category C(S)	45859	Upload Photo
Birgham, Hollybrae, Including Boundary Walls, Gatepiers And Gates				55°38′38″N 2°20′14″W	Category C(S)	45865	Upload Photo
Bughtrig, Wood Cottage Including Ancillary Structure				55°41′50″N 2°19′32″W	Category C(S)	45870	Upload Photo
Eccles Main Street, Eccles Mains Farmhouse Including Boundary Wall				55°39′59″N 2°22′38″W	Category C(S)	45877	Upload another image
Eccles Newton Farmhouse Including Garden Railings, Walls And Gatepier				55°39′29″N 2°21′25″W	Category B	45878	Upload Photo
Kames Cottages				55°42′04″N 2°21′02″W	Category C(S)	45882	Upload Photo
Leitholm, Church Lane, Leitholm Church (Church Of Scotland)				55°41′25″N 2°20′06″W	Category C(S)	45888	Upload Photo
Leitholm, Main Street, Bughtrig Cottage				55°41′31″N 2°19′55″W	Category C(S)	45892	Upload Photo
Stainrigg, Well				55°41′12″N 2°20′48″W	Category C(S)	45907	Upload Photo
Bughtrig House				55°41′46″N 2°19′34″W	Category A	4114	Upload another image
West Leitholm Bridge, Crossing Lamden Burn				55°41′20″N 2°20′25″W	Category B	211	Upload Photo
Eccles House, Lodge				55°39′53″N 2°22′52″W	Category C(S)	45873	Upload Photo
Homebank House				55°38′59″N 2°18′59″W	Category B	45881	Upload Photo
Kames Walled Garden				55°42′02″N 2°20′58″W	Category B	45884	Upload Photo
Leitholm, Main Street, Well Cottage				55°41′26″N 2°20′06″W	Category C(S)	45894	Upload Photo
Stonefold Farmhouse Including Garden Walls, Gatepiers And Gates				55°40′31″N 2°24′40″W	Category C(S)	45908	Upload Photo
Eccles Main Street, Village Hall (Former Free Church) Including Boundary Walls				55°39′57″N 2°22′38″W	Category C(S)	45876	Upload another image
1 And 2 Kames West Mains Farm Cottages				55°41′42″N 2°20′52″W	Category C(S)	45886	Upload Photo
Leitholm, Main Street, Mansfield House Including Garden Walls				55°41′22″N 2°20′20″W	Category C(S)	45889	Upload Photo
Leitholm, Main Street, Braehead Cottage Including Boundary Wall				55°41′23″N 2°20′19″W	Category C(S)	45890	Upload Photo
Leitholm, Main Street, Earnslaw House Including Boundary Wall, Railings And Gates				55°41′27″N 2°20′07″W	Category C(S)	45891	Upload Photo
Leitholm, Main Street, The Plough Hotel Including Cobbled Forecourt				55°41′25″N 2°20′10″W	Category C(S)	45893	Upload Photo
Pittlesheugh Farmhouse Including Garden Walls				55°40′56″N 2°23′32″W	Category C(S)	45899	Upload Photo
Kames House Including Cobbled Courtyard				55°42′08″N 2°20′51″W	Category A	4115	Upload Photo
Bartlehill Farmhouse				55°39′25″N 2°21′51″W	Category C(S)	45860	Upload Photo
Lochrig Farmhouse				55°42′20″N 2°19′43″W	Category C(S)	45896	Upload Photo
Mersington Mill Including Garden Walls				55°41′37″N 2°22′07″W	Category C(S)	45898	Upload Photo
Purves Hall (House) Including Entrance Wall				55°41′49″N 2°22′52″W	Category C(S)	45901	Upload Photo
Purves Hall, Walled Garden				55°41′51″N 2°22′54″W	Category C(S)	45902	Upload Photo
West Printonan Farmhouse Including Ancillary Structure And Garden Walls				55°42′35″N 2°20′56″W	Category B	45909	Upload Photo
Belchester Including Terraced Garden, Sundial, Garden Railings, Gatepiers And Gate				55°41′05″N 2°19′41″W	Category B	4113	Upload Photo
Birgham, Springhill House Including Dovecot, Well, Quadrant Walls, Gatepiers And Gates				55°38′33″N 2°20′30″W	Category B	4117	Upload Photo
Bughtrig, East Lodge Including Entrance Walls And Gatepiers				55°41′45″N 2°19′24″W	Category C(S)	213	Upload Photo
Belchester Lodge Including Quadrant Walls, Piers, Gatepiers And Gates				55°40′51″N 2°20′04″W	Category C(S)	45861	Upload Photo
Birgham, Dub Cottage				55°38′27″N 2°20′47″W	Category C(S)	45864	Upload Photo
Bridge, Near Mersington House, Crossing Lambden Burn				55°41′28″N 2°21′45″W	Category B	45868	Upload Photo
23 Eccles Main Street, East Lodge (Formerly To Eccles House) Including Gatepiers				55°39′55″N 2°22′43″W	Category C(S)	45875	Upload Photo
Kames North Entrance				55°42′24″N 2°21′24″W	Category C(S)	45883	Upload Photo
Kames West Lodge Including Cobbled Forecourt, Quadrant Walls, Piers, Gatepiers And Gates				55°42′05″N 2°21′23″W	Category C(S)	45885	Upload Photo
Stainrigg, Walled Garden Including Potting Shed, Outer Garden Walls And Railings				55°41′12″N 2°20′56″W	Category C(S)	45906	Upload Photo
Purves Hall (Tower)				55°41′50″N 2°22′55″W	Category B	4144	Upload Photo
Anton's Hill, East Lodge Including Gatepiers And Gate				55°41′08″N 2°20′21″W	Category C(S)	45858	Upload Photo

== Key ==
The scheme for classifying buildings in Scotland is:

- Category A: "buildings of national or international importance, either architectural or historic; or fine, little-altered examples of some particular period, style or building type."
- Category B: "buildings of regional or more than local importance; or major examples of some particular period, style or building type, which may have been altered."
- Category C: "buildings of local importance; lesser examples of any period, style, or building type, as originally constructed or moderately altered; and simple traditional buildings which group well with other listed buildings."

In March 2016 there were 47,288 listed buildings in Scotland. Of these, 8% were Category A, and 50% were Category B, with the remaining 42% being Category C.
