= List of listed buildings in Crailing, Scottish Borders =

This is a list of listed buildings in the parish of Crailing in the Scottish Borders, Scotland.

== List ==
Name	Location	Date Listed	Grid Ref. (Note: Sometimes known as OSGB36, the grid reference (where provided) is based on the British national grid reference system used by the Ordnance Survey. • "Guide to National Grid". Ordnance Survey. • "Get-a-map". Ordnance Survey.)	Geo-coordinates	Notes	LB Number (Note: Historic Environment Scotland assign a unique alphanumeric identifier to each designated site in Scotland, for listed buildings this always begins with "LB", for example "LB12345".)	Image
Waterloo Monument				55°31′45″N 2°33′01″W	Category B	4263	Upload Photo
Crailing Church And Graveyard				55°31′05″N 2°30′17″W	Category B	2078	Upload another image
Crailing Bridge				55°30′50″N 2°29′51″W	Category B	2082	Upload another image
West Lodge, Crailing House				55°30′51″N 2°29′48″W	Category B	2083	Upload another image See more images
Crailing House				55°30′43″N 2°29′41″W	Category A	2080	Upload another image See more images
Stables, Crailing House				55°30′47″N 2°29′44″W	Category B	2085	Upload Photo
Dovecot, Monteviot House				55°30′49″N 2°33′04″W	Category B	2086	Upload Photo

== Key ==
The scheme for classifying buildings in Scotland is:

- Category A: "buildings of national or international importance, either architectural or historic; or fine, little-altered examples of some particular period, style or building type."
- Category B: "buildings of regional or more than local importance; or major examples of some particular period, style or building type, which may have been altered."
- Category C: "buildings of local importance; lesser examples of any period, style, or building type, as originally constructed or moderately altered; and simple traditional buildings which group well with other listed buildings."

In March 2016 there were 47,288 listed buildings in Scotland. Of these, 8% were Category A, and 50% were Category B, with the remaining 42% being Category C.
