= List of listed buildings in Ednam, Scottish Borders =

This is a list of listed buildings in the parish of Ednam in the Scottish Borders, Scotland.

== List ==
Name	Location	Date Listed	Grid Ref. (Note: Sometimes known as OSGB36, the grid reference (where provided) is based on the British national grid reference system used by the Ordnance Survey. • "Guide to National Grid". Ordnance Survey. • "Get-a-map". Ordnance Survey.)	Geo-coordinates	Notes	LB Number (Note: Historic Environment Scotland assign a unique alphanumeric identifier to each designated site in Scotland, for listed buildings this always begins with "LB", for example "LB12345".)	Image
Hendersyde Park, Game Larder (Near Former Middle Walk)				55°36′49″N 2°24′20″W	Category C(S)	50973	Upload Photo
Hendersyde Park, Tanlaw Avenue, Water Tower				55°36′58″N 2°24′32″W	Category C(S)	50974	Upload Photo
Hendersyde Park, Tanlaw Cottage, Ancillary Buildings And Boundary Walls				55°36′49″N 2°24′47″W	Category C(S)	50975	Upload Photo
Easter Hendersyde (Formerly East Lodge) Gatepiers, Gates And Walls				55°37′12″N 2°23′44″W	Category C(S)	2076	Upload Photo
Hendersyde Park, Tanlaw Wood Avenue, Monument To Anna Maria Griffith				55°37′00″N 2°24′29″W	Category C(S)	50977	Upload Photo
Ednam Church And Graveyard				55°37′38″N 2°25′10″W	Category B	2069	Upload Photo
Ednam Bridge				55°37′39″N 2°24′57″W	Category B	2073	Upload Photo
Eden Hall With Piers, Boundary Wall And Walled Garden				55°38′14″N 2°22′25″W	Category C(S)	44611	Upload Photo
Ednam Smithy				55°37′40″N 2°24′55″W	Category C(S)	2070	Upload Photo
Thomson's Monument Ferneyhill				55°37′09″N 2°25′22″W	Category B	2074	Upload Photo
Hendersyde Park, Stable Court, Stable Cottage, Coach House And Associated Buildings				55°36′51″N 2°24′28″W	Category B	2077	Upload Photo
Hendersyde Park, Tanlaw House, Hen House, Garden Walls And Gates And Railings To Separate Enclosed Garden				55°36′49″N 2°24′46″W	Category C(S)	50976	Upload Photo
Hendersyde Park, Walled Orchard And Stone Shed And Including Gatepiers				55°36′54″N 2°24′21″W	Category C(S)	50978	Upload Photo

== Key ==
The scheme for classifying buildings in Scotland is:

- Category A: "buildings of national or international importance, either architectural or historic; or fine, little-altered examples of some particular period, style or building type."
- Category B: "buildings of regional or more than local importance; or major examples of some particular period, style or building type, which may have been altered."
- Category C: "buildings of local importance; lesser examples of any period, style, or building type, as originally constructed or moderately altered; and simple traditional buildings which group well with other listed buildings."

In March 2016 there were 47,288 listed buildings in Scotland. Of these, 8% were Category A, and 50% were Category B, with the remaining 42% being Category C.
