= List of listed buildings in Tweedsmuir, Scottish Borders =

This is a list of listed buildings in the parish of Tweedsmuir in the Scottish Borders, Scotland.

== List ==
Name	Location	Date Listed	Grid Ref. (Note: Sometimes known as OSGB36, the grid reference (where provided) is based on the British national grid reference system used by the Ordnance Survey. • "Guide to National Grid". Ordnance Survey. • "Get-a-map". Ordnance Survey.)	Geo-coordinates	Notes	LB Number (Note: Historic Environment Scotland assign a unique alphanumeric identifier to each designated site in Scotland, for listed buildings this always begins with "LB", for example "LB12345".)	Image
Tweedsmuir Parish Church And Churchyard				55°30′22″N 3°25′32″W	Category B	15424	Upload Photo
The Bield				55°30′31″N 3°25′37″W	Category B	15426	Upload Photo
Crook Inn With Railings And Ancillary Buildings				55°31′25″N 3°24′34″W	Category C(S)	49036	Upload Photo
Victoria Lodge, To North Of Talla Reservoir				55°29′37″N 3°24′53″W	Category B	47120	Upload Photo
Carlows Brig				55°30′16″N 3°25′49″W	Category B	15425	Upload Photo

== Key ==
The scheme for classifying buildings in Scotland is:

- Category A: "buildings of national or international importance, either architectural or historic; or fine, little-altered examples of some particular period, style or building type."
- Category B: "buildings of regional or more than local importance; or major examples of some particular period, style or building type, which may have been altered."
- Category C: "buildings of local importance; lesser examples of any period, style, or building type, as originally constructed or moderately altered; and simple traditional buildings which group well with other listed buildings."

In March 2016 there were 47,288 listed buildings in Scotland. Of these, 8% were Category A, and 50% were Category B, with the remaining 42% being Category C.
