= List of listed buildings in Kirkhope, Scottish Borders =

This is a list of listed buildings in the parish of Kirkhope in the Scottish Borders, Scotland.

== List ==
Name	Location	Date listed	Geo-coordinates	Notes	Category	LB number	Image
Ettrick Bridge			55°30′30″N 2°58′01″W		B	8206	Upload Photo
Kirkhope Tower			55°30′55″N 2°59′08″W		A	6720	Upload Photo
Ettrickshaws Country House Hotel, Bridge Over Ettrick Water			55°29′57″N 2°59′15″W		C(S)	49226	Upload Photo
Woodend Road, Ettrickbridge (Kirkhope) Church Of Scotland Church Including War Memorial Lychgate, Boundary Walls And Railings			55°30′32″N 2°58′03″W		C(S)	8205	Upload Photo
Hyndhope Bridge			55°28′57″N 3°00′06″W		C(S)	13671	Upload Photo

== Key ==
The scheme for classifying buildings in Scotland is:

- Category A: "buildings of national or international importance, either architectural or historic; or fine, little-altered examples of some particular period, style or building type."
- Category B: "buildings of regional or more than local importance; or major examples of some particular period, style or building type, which may have been altered."
- Category C: "buildings of local importance; lesser examples of any period, style, or building type, as originally constructed or moderately altered; and simple traditional buildings which group well with other listed buildings."

In March 2016 there were 47,288 listed buildings in Scotland. Of these, 8% were Category A, and 50% were Category B, with the remaining 42% being Category C.
