= List of listed buildings in Morebattle, Scottish Borders =

This is a list of listed buildings in the parish of Morebattle in the Scottish Borders, Scotland.

== List ==
Name	Location	Date Listed	Grid Ref. (Note: Sometimes known as OSGB36, the grid reference (where provided) is based on the British national grid reference system used by the Ordnance Survey. • "Guide to National Grid". Ordnance Survey. • "Get-a-map". Ordnance Survey.)	Geo-coordinates	Notes	LB Number (Note: Historic Environment Scotland assign a unique alphanumeric identifier to each designated site in Scotland, for listed buildings this always begins with "LB", for example "LB12345".)	Image
Old Belford House				55°28′53″N 2°17′50″W	Category C(S)	15231	Upload Photo
Morebattle, Former United Free Church				55°31′01″N 2°21′41″W	Category B	46725	Upload another image See more images
Parish Church Of Saint Lawrence And Graveyard				55°31′06″N 2°21′45″W	Category B	15224	Upload another image See more images
Lochside House, Including Service Wing, Water Tower, Coach House, Former Stables, Lodge, Gatepiers, Boundary Wall, Steading And Steading Cottage				55°32′50″N 2°19′08″W	Category B	49457	Upload Photo
Wellgate Including Outbuildings And Boundary Walls				55°31′04″N 2°21′46″W	Category C(S)	19732	Upload another image
Morebattle, Templehall Inn				55°31′02″N 2°21′43″W	Category C(S)	15228	Upload another image See more images
Corbet Tower				55°30′30″N 2°21′19″W	Category B	15229	Upload Photo

== Key ==
The scheme for classifying buildings in Scotland is:

- Category A: "buildings of national or international importance, either architectural or historic; or fine, little-altered examples of some particular period, style or building type."
- Category B: "buildings of regional or more than local importance; or major examples of some particular period, style or building type, which may have been altered."
- Category C: "buildings of local importance; lesser examples of any period, style, or building type, as originally constructed or moderately altered; and simple traditional buildings which group well with other listed buildings."

In March 2016 there were 47,288 listed buildings in Scotland. Of these, 8% were Category A, and 50% were Category B, with the remaining 42% being Category C.
