= List of listed buildings in Southdean, Scottish Borders =

This is a list of listed buildings in the parish of Southdean in the Scottish Borders, Scotland.

== List ==
Name	Location	Date Listed	Grid Ref. (Note: Sometimes known as OSGB36, the grid reference (where provided) is based on the British national grid reference system used by the Ordnance Survey. • "Guide to National Grid". Ordnance Survey. • "Get-a-map". Ordnance Survey.)	Geo-coordinates	Notes	LB Number (Note: Historic Environment Scotland assign a unique alphanumeric identifier to each designated site in Scotland, for listed buildings this always begins with "LB", for example "LB12345".)	Image
Remains Of Old Church In Graveyard At Chesters				55°23′20″N 2°35′28″W	Category B	19748	Upload another image
Glendouglas, Including Stabling				55°27′03″N 2°33′03″W	Category B	15463	Upload Photo
Chesters, Southdean Parish Church (Church Of Scotland) Including Boundary Wall				55°23′26″N 2°35′42″W	Category C(S)	49195	Upload Photo
Pele House, Slacks Tower				55°22′54″N 2°33′48″W	Category B	13869	Upload Photo
Southdean Bridge				55°22′33″N 2°35′09″W	Category C(S)	15461	Upload Photo
Stables, Abbotrule				55°24′30″N 2°37′04″W	Category B	15458	Upload Photo
Southdean Church				55°22′30″N 2°34′59″W	Category B	15456	Upload Photo
Pele-House, Northbank				55°22′40″N 2°32′12″W	Category B	15460	Upload Photo
Abbotrule Church				55°24′26″N 2°36′54″W	Category B	15457	Upload Photo
Pele-House, Kilnsike				55°24′35″N 2°34′45″W	Category B	15459	Upload Photo
Mervinslaw Pele				55°23′55″N 2°31′11″W	Category A	13886	Upload another image

== Key ==
The scheme for classifying buildings in Scotland is:

- Category A: "buildings of national or international importance, either architectural or historic; or fine, little-altered examples of some particular period, style or building type."
- Category B: "buildings of regional or more than local importance; or major examples of some particular period, style or building type, which may have been altered."
- Category C: "buildings of local importance; lesser examples of any period, style, or building type, as originally constructed or moderately altered; and simple traditional buildings which group well with other listed buildings."

In March 2016 there were 47,288 listed buildings in Scotland. Of these, 8% were Category A, and 50% were Category B, with the remaining 42% being Category C.
