= List of listed buildings in Bowden, Scottish Borders =

This is a list of listed buildings in the parish of Bowden in the Scottish Borders, Scotland.

== List ==
Name	Location	Date Listed	Grid Ref. (Note: Sometimes known as OSGB36, the grid reference (where provided) is based on the British national grid reference system used by the Ordnance Survey. • "Guide to National Grid". Ordnance Survey. • "Get-a-map". Ordnance Survey.)	Geo-coordinates	Notes	LB Number (Note: Historic Environment Scotland assign a unique alphanumeric identifier to each designated site in Scotland, for listed buildings this always begins with "LB", for example "LB12345".)	Image
Bowden, Schoolhouse Including Boundary Walls				55°33′59″N 2°42′30″W	Category C(S)	23	Upload Photo
Toftsbarns Bridge Over Ale Water				55°31′38″N 2°43′55″W	Category C(S)	29	Upload Photo
Linthill Walled Garden				55°31′38″N 2°43′13″W	Category B	49225	Upload Photo
Bowden Church And Graveyard				55°33′47″N 2°42′29″W	Category A	1920	Upload another image See more images
Kippilaw Mains Farm, Bowden				55°33′13″N 2°43′01″W	Category B	1923	Upload Photo
Linthill Steading				55°31′38″N 2°43′17″W	Category B	49224	Upload Photo
Kippilaw, Bowden				55°33′00″N 2°42′59″W	Category B	1922	Upload Photo
Saw Mill, Burnfoot Bowden				55°33′54″N 2°42′14″W	Category B	1924	Upload Photo
Smithy And Pall House Midlem Village				55°32′18″N 2°45′02″W	Category B	6659	Upload Photo
Dovecote, Cavers Carre				55°32′02″N 2°42′43″W	Category B	1926	Upload Photo
Kippilaw Entrance Gateway And Boundary Walls				55°33′14″N 2°42′22″W	Category C(S)	27	Upload Photo
Linthill Policies, Bridge				55°31′41″N 2°43′17″W	Category C(S)	28	Upload Photo
Bowden Bridge				55°33′48″N 2°42′30″W	Category C(S)	22	Upload Photo
Linthill				55°31′44″N 2°43′24″W	Category B	1915	Upload Photo
Holydean Castle				55°33′49″N 2°44′06″W	Category B	1921	Upload Photo
Cavers Carre				55°32′00″N 2°42′45″W	Category B	1925	Upload Photo
Midlem, K6 Telephone Kiosk				55°32′19″N 2°45′00″W	Category B	6412	Upload Photo
Bowden, Market Cross				55°33′59″N 2°42′31″W	Category C(S)	24	Upload Photo
Kirk House				55°33′46″N 2°42′33″W	Category C(S)	21	Upload Photo
Bowden, Pump				55°33′59″N 2°42′31″W	Category C(S)	25	Upload Photo

== Key ==
The scheme for classifying buildings in Scotland is:

- Category A: "buildings of national or international importance, either architectural or historic; or fine, little-altered examples of some particular period, style or building type."
- Category B: "buildings of regional or more than local importance; or major examples of some particular period, style or building type, which may have been altered."
- Category C: "buildings of local importance; lesser examples of any period, style, or building type, as originally constructed or moderately altered; and simple traditional buildings which group well with other listed buildings."

In March 2016 there were 47,288 listed buildings in Scotland. Of these, 8% were Category A, and 50% were Category B, with the remaining 42% being Category C.
