= List of listed buildings in Broughton, Glenholm And Kilbucho, Scottish Borders =

This is a list of listed buildings in the parish of Broughton, Glenholm and Kilbucho in the Scottish Borders, Scotland.

== List ==
| Name | Location | Date Listed | Grid Ref. (Note: Sometimes known as OSGB36, the grid reference (where provided) is based on the British national grid reference system used by the Ordnance Survey. • "Guide to National Grid". Ordnance Survey. • "Get-a-map". Ordnance Survey.) | Geo-coordinates | Notes | LB Number (Note: Historic Environment Scotland assign a unique alphanumeric identifier to each designated site in Scotland, for listed buildings this always begins with "LB", for example "LB12345".) | Image |
|---|---|---|---|---|---|---|---|
| Broughton Village, 7 Cottages, Broughton Green House Etc (See Paper List For Full Details) | | | | 55°36′55″N 3°24′40″W | Category B | 4262 | Upload Photo |
| Broughton Village, Range Of 7 Cottages. (Megdale, Glenburn, Greenhope, Bodsbeck, Bridgend, Gavington, Crossford) | | | | 55°36′56″N 3°24′39″W | Category B | 1992 | Upload Photo |
| Hartree Hotel | | | | 55°36′34″N 3°30′56″W | Category C(S) | 2009 | Upload Photo |
| Broughton Village Pair Of Cottages At Corner Of Biggar Road. ('Laurel Bank' Cottage And Solway Cottage) | | | | 55°36′57″N 3°24′42″W | Category B | 2028 | Upload Photo |
| Broughton Village, Green Farm Steading (Comprising Offices, Garage And Store) | | | | 55°36′55″N 3°24′39″W | Category B | 2029 | Upload Photo |
| Broughton Place | | | | 55°37′14″N 3°24′14″W | Category B | 2031 | Upload Photo |
| Quarter House | | | | 55°35′08″N 3°25′42″W | Category C(S) | 136 | Upload Photo |
| Rachan Mill Farm Including Farmhouse, Steading, Ancillary Structure And Boundary Walls | | | | 55°35′43″N 3°24′23″W | Category B | 46524 | Upload Photo |
| Rachan Mill Farm, Millside, Old Mill Cottage And Sawmill Cottage | | | | 55°35′45″N 3°24′23″W | Category C(S) | 46525 | Upload Photo |
| Whitslade Cottages | | | | 55°36′03″N 3°24′37″W | Category B | 2000 | Upload Photo |
| Cardon Farmhouse And Steading | | | | 55°35′01″N 3°25′51″W | Category C(S) | 2002 | Upload Photo |
| Kilbucho Place, Entrance Gate | | | | 55°36′08″N 3°26′20″W | Category B | 2006 | Upload Photo |
| Whitslade House | | | | 55°36′03″N 3°24′33″W | Category B | 1999 | Upload Photo |
| Nether Whitslade | | | | 55°36′04″N 3°24′22″W | Category C(S) | 2001 | Upload Photo |
| Kilbucho Place | | | | 55°36′06″N 3°26′22″W | Category B | 2005 | Upload Photo |
| Kilbucho Church | | | | 55°35′18″N 3°29′04″W | Category B | 2007 | Upload Photo |
| Kilbucho Manse | | | | 55°35′17″N 3°29′02″W | Category B | 2008 | Upload Photo |
| Rachan Wood, Memorial To Thomas Tweedie Including Enclosure Railings And Gate | | | | 55°35′53″N 3°23′37″W | Category C(S) | 50604 | Upload Photo |
| Easter Calzeat | | | | 55°36′30″N 3°24′12″W | Category B | 1997 | Upload Photo |
| War Memorial Calzeat | | | | 55°36′32″N 3°24′35″W | Category B | 1998 | Upload Photo |
| Mossfennan House | | | | 55°34′14″N 3°24′04″W | Category B | 2004 | Upload Photo |
| Wrae Castle | | | | 55°35′03″N 3°24′20″W | Category C(S) | 2003 | Upload Photo |
| Old Parish Church Broughton | | | | 55°37′00″N 3°24′50″W | Category B | 1996 | Upload Photo |
| Broughton Village, Old Summerhouse | | | | 55°36′55″N 3°24′36″W | Category B | 2030 | Upload Photo |

== Key ==
The scheme for classifying buildings in Scotland is:

- Category A: "buildings of national or international importance, either architectural or historic; or fine, little-altered examples of some particular period, style or building type."
- Category B: "buildings of regional or more than local importance; or major examples of some particular period, style or building type, which may have been altered."
- Category C: "buildings of local importance; lesser examples of any period, style, or building type, as originally constructed or moderately altered; and simple traditional buildings which group well with other listed buildings."

In March 2016 there were 47,288 listed buildings in Scotland. Of these, 8% were Category A, and 50% were Category B, with the remaining 42% being Category C.
