= List of listed buildings in Ashkirk, Scottish Borders =

This is a list of listed buildings in the parish of Ashkirk in the Scottish Borders, Scotland.

== List ==
| Name | Location | Date Listed | Grid Ref. (Note: Sometimes known as OSGB36, the grid reference (where provided) is based on the British national grid reference system used by the Ordnance Survey. • "Guide to National Grid". Ordnance Survey. • "Get-a-map". Ordnance Survey.) | Geo-coordinates | Notes | LB Number (Note: Historic Environment Scotland assign a unique alphanumeric identifier to each designated site in Scotland, for listed buildings this always begins with "LB", for example "LB12345".) | Image |
|---|---|---|---|---|---|---|---|
| Ashkirk Church | | | | 55°29′20″N 2°50′48″W | Category B | 1916 | Upload another image See more images |
| Graveyard | | | | 55°29′20″N 2°50′47″W | Category B | 1917 | Upload Photo |
| Todrig (George S Easton And Sons) | | | | 55°28′04″N 2°54′13″W | Category B | 1918 | Upload Photo |
| North Synton | | | | 55°30′15″N 2°48′56″W | Category C(S) | 1919 | Upload Photo |

== Key ==
The scheme for classifying buildings in Scotland is:

- Category A: "buildings of national or international importance, either architectural or historic; or fine, little-altered examples of some particular period, style or building type."
- Category B: "buildings of regional or more than local importance; or major examples of some particular period, style or building type, which may have been altered."
- Category C: "buildings of local importance; lesser examples of any period, style, or building type, as originally constructed or moderately altered; and simple traditional buildings which group well with other listed buildings."

In March 2016 there were 47,288 listed buildings in Scotland. Of these, 8% were Category A, and 50% were Category B, with the remaining 42% being Category C.
