= List of listed buildings in Foulden, Scottish Borders =

This is a list of listed buildings in the parish of Foulden in the Scottish Borders, Scotland.

== List ==
Name	Location	Date Listed	Grid Ref. (Note: Sometimes known as OSGB36, the grid reference (where provided) is based on the British national grid reference system used by the Ordnance Survey. • "Guide to National Grid". Ordnance Survey. • "Get-a-map". Ordnance Survey.)	Geo-coordinates	Notes	LB Number (Note: Historic Environment Scotland assign a unique alphanumeric identifier to each designated site in Scotland, for listed buildings this always begins with "LB", for example "LB12345".)	Image
37A Foulden Village Including Cobbled Walkway				55°47′45″N 2°07′05″W	Category C(S)	46573	Upload Photo
West Foulden Farm, Cartshed And Granary				55°47′44″N 2°08′44″W	Category C(S)	46584	Upload Photo
Foulden Tithe Barn Including Cobbled Yard And Boundary Walls				55°47′44″N 2°06′42″W	Category A	10510	Upload another image
Nunlands House Including Ancillary Structures, Boundary Walls, Gatepiers And Quadrant Walls				55°48′02″N 2°06′20″W	Category B	10511	Upload Photo
Moorpark Farmhouse Or 25 Moorpark				55°48′38″N 2°07′40″W	Category C(S)	46583	Upload Photo
Foulden Church (Church Of Scotland) Including Graveyard, Boundary Walls, Gatepiers, Gates And Mounting Stone				55°47′43″N 2°06′42″W	Category B	10485	Upload Photo
Church House (Former Manse) Including Ancillary Structure, Boundary Walls, Gatepiers And Gate				55°47′42″N 2°06′45″W	Category B	10486	Upload Photo
16 Foulden Village				55°47′44″N 2°06′58″W	Category B	46574	Upload Photo
Foulden Village, War Memorial				55°47′44″N 2°07′06″W	Category C(S)	46582	Upload Photo
11 And 12 Foulden Holdings				55°47′56″N 2°07′29″W	Category C(S)	46570	Upload Photo
Foulden Village, Bankhill, Drumoyne And The Old Schoolhouse Including Boundary Wall				55°47′45″N 2°07′07″W	Category B	46575	Upload Photo
Foulden Village, Mansefield				55°47′44″N 2°06′57″W	Category B	46578	Upload Photo
37 Foulden Village Including Cobbled Walkway				55°47′44″N 2°07′04″W	Category C(S)	13644	Upload Photo
Foulden Village, Cheviot View				55°47′44″N 2°06′56″W	Category B	46577	Upload Photo
Foulden Village, Rose Cottage Including Cobbled Walkway				55°47′44″N 2°07′03″W	Category C(S)	46579	Upload Photo
Foulden Village, Thistle Cottage Including Ancillary Structure And Boundary Walls				55°47′46″N 2°07′08″W	Category C(S)	46580	Upload Photo
Foulden Village, Wallflower Cottage Including Cobbled Walkway				55°47′45″N 2°07′06″W	Category C(S)	46581	Upload Photo

== Key ==
The scheme for classifying buildings in Scotland is:

- Category A: "buildings of national or international importance, either architectural or historic; or fine, little-altered examples of some particular period, style or building type."
- Category B: "buildings of regional or more than local importance; or major examples of some particular period, style or building type, which may have been altered."
- Category C: "buildings of local importance; lesser examples of any period, style, or building type, as originally constructed or moderately altered; and simple traditional buildings which group well with other listed buildings."

In March 2016 there were 47,288 listed buildings in Scotland. Of these, 8% were Category A, and 50% were Category B, with the remaining 42% being Category C.
