= List of listed buildings in Mordington, Scottish Borders =

This is a list of listed buildings in the parish of Mordington in the Scottish Borders, Scotland.

== List ==
| Name | Location | Date listed | Geo-coordinates | Notes | Category | LB number | Image |
|---|---|---|---|---|---|---|---|
| Edrington Castle Mill | | | 55°46′27″N 2°05′54″W | | C(S) | 46561 | Upload Photo |
| Edrington House, Quadrant Walls, Gatepiers And Gates | | | 55°47′28″N 2°05′30″W | | C(S) | 46563 | Upload Photo |
| Cawderstanes House, Weather Vane | | | 55°46′14″N 2°05′41″W | | C(S) | 46557 | Upload another image |
| Edrington House Including Ancillary Structure And Sundial | | | 55°47′17″N 2°05′38″W | | B | 19739 | Upload Photo |
| Lamberton Church And Graveyard Including Boundary Walls | | | 55°48′35″N 2°03′08″W | | B | 15342 | Upload Photo |
| Mordington, Burial Vault Including Graveyard And Boundary Wall | | | 55°47′47″N 2°04′46″W | | B | 13851 | Upload Photo |
| Clappers, No 1, The Old Smithy House And The Smithy Including Boundary Walls | | | 55°47′38″N 2°05′14″W | | C(S) | 46558 | Upload Photo |
| Edrington House, Edrington Lodge Including Boundary Walls | | | 55°47′28″N 2°05′30″W | | C(S) | 46562 | Upload Photo |
| Clappers, The Old School House And The Old School Including Ancillary Structure, Gatepiers And Boundary Walls | | | 55°47′37″N 2°05′13″W | | C(S) | 46560 | Upload Photo |
| Mordington House, Boundary Walls, Quadrant Walls And Gatepiers | | | 55°47′53″N 2°04′48″W | | C(S) | 46565 | Upload Photo |
| Mordington, Old Graveyard Including Boundary Walls, Gatepiers, Gate And Style | | | 55°47′29″N 2°05′25″W | | C(S) | 17415 | Upload Photo |
| Mordington House, Gate Lodge Including Boundary Wall | | | 55°47′54″N 2°04′58″W | | C(S) | 46566 | Upload Photo |
| Cawderstanes House, Greenhouse And Gardener's Cottage | | | 55°46′15″N 2°05′44″W | | B | 46556 | Upload Photo |
| Edrington House, Walled Garden | | | 55°47′18″N 2°05′37″W | | C(S) | 46564 | Upload Photo |
| Mordington House, Walled Garden | | | 55°47′54″N 2°04′38″W | | C(S) | 46567 | Upload Photo |
| 1 Mordington Mains, Century House Including Walled Garden | | | 55°48′08″N 2°05′01″W | | C(S) | 46568 | Upload Photo |

== Key ==
The scheme for classifying buildings in Scotland is:

- Category A: "buildings of national or international importance, either architectural or historic; or fine, little-altered examples of some particular period, style or building type."
- Category B: "buildings of regional or more than local importance; or major examples of some particular period, style or building type, which may have been altered."
- Category C: "buildings of local importance; lesser examples of any period, style, or building type, as originally constructed or moderately altered; and simple traditional buildings which group well with other listed buildings."

In March 2016 there were 47,288 listed buildings in Scotland. Of these, 8% were Category A, and 50% were Category B, with the remaining 42% being Category C.
