= List of listed buildings in Cockburnspath, Scottish Borders =

This is a list of listed buildings in the parish of Cockburnspath in the Scottish Borders, Scotland.

== List ==
Name	Location	Date Listed	Grid Ref. (Note: Sometimes known as OSGB36, the grid reference (where provided) is based on the British national grid reference system used by the Ordnance Survey. • "Guide to National Grid". Ordnance Survey. • "Get-a-map". Ordnance Survey.)	Geo-coordinates	Notes	LB Number (Note: Historic Environment Scotland assign a unique alphanumeric identifier to each designated site in Scotland, for listed buildings this always begins with "LB", for example "LB12345".)	Image
Old Stables And Cottage To Rear And At Side Of The Cockburnspath Inn				55°55′58″N 2°21′39″W	Category B	4049	Upload Photo
Cove Harbour, Tunnel Entrance				55°56′18″N 2°20′52″W	Category B	6417	Upload Photo
Pease Bridge				55°55′21″N 2°20′07″W	Category A	4054	Upload another image
A.1 Road Bridge, Dunglass				55°56′32″N 2°22′05″W	Category B	4057	Upload Photo
St Helen's Kirk And Kirkyard				55°55′44″N 2°18′56″W	Category A	4051	Upload Photo
Cockburnspath Tower				55°55′16″N 2°20′46″W	Category B	4053	Upload Photo
New Bridge, Dunglass				55°56′29″N 2°22′12″W	Category B	4055	Upload Photo
Cockburnspath Station House				55°56′16″N 2°21′38″W	Category C(S)	48937	Upload Photo
Cockburnspath Church And Graveyard				55°55′54″N 2°21′45″W	Category A	4129	Upload another image See more images
Market Cross Cockburnspath				55°55′57″N 2°21′46″W	Category A	4047	Upload another image See more images
Old Tower Bridge				55°55′14″N 2°20′47″W	Category B	4052	Upload Photo
Old Bridge, Dunglass				55°56′36″N 2°21′59″W	Category B	4058	Upload Photo
Dunglass Policies, Merse Lodge				55°56′27″N 2°22′11″W	Category C(S)	6414	Upload Photo
Dunglass Viaduct				55°56′31″N 2°22′07″W	Category B	4056	Upload Photo
Cove Harbour, Pier And Breakwater				55°56′16″N 2°20′44″W	Category B	6415	Upload Photo
Old Manor House (Sparrow Castle)				55°55′55″N 2°21′43″W	Category A	4046	Upload Photo
Premises Of Geo Hay And Sons General Merchants				55°55′58″N 2°21′43″W	Category B	4050	Upload Photo
Cove Harbour, Cottages/Store Sheds At Pier				55°56′19″N 2°20′47″W	Category B	6416	Upload another image
Smithy, Cockburnspath				55°55′53″N 2°21′45″W	Category B	4048	Upload Photo

== Key ==
The scheme for classifying buildings in Scotland is:

- Category A: "buildings of national or international importance, either architectural or historic; or fine, little-altered examples of some particular period, style or building type."
- Category B: "buildings of regional or more than local importance; or major examples of some particular period, style or building type, which may have been altered."
- Category C: "buildings of local importance; lesser examples of any period, style, or building type, as originally constructed or moderately altered; and simple traditional buildings which group well with other listed buildings."

In March 2016 there were 47,288 listed buildings in Scotland. Of these, 8% were Category A, and 50% were Category B, with the remaining 42% being Category C.
