= List of listed buildings in Castleton, Scottish Borders =

This is a list of listed buildings in the parish of Castleton in the Scottish Borders, Scotland.

== List ==
Name	Location	Date Listed	Grid Ref. (Note: Sometimes known as OSGB36, the grid reference (where provided) is based on the British national grid reference system used by the Ordnance Survey. • "Guide to National Grid". Ordnance Survey. • "Get-a-map". Ordnance Survey.)	Geo-coordinates	Notes	LB Number (Note: Historic Environment Scotland assign a unique alphanumeric identifier to each designated site in Scotland, for listed buildings this always begins with "LB", for example "LB12345".)	Image
Hermitage Bridge				55°11′52″N 2°47′36″W	Category C(S)	4260	Upload Photo
Riccarton Mill, Former Granary And Byre, And Kiln				55°14′49″N 2°42′37″W	Category C(S)	51762	Upload Photo
Castleton Old Parish Church Including Schoolroom, Old Bankend House, Mounting Block And Boundary Walls				55°11′49″N 2°47′30″W	Category B	6624	Upload Photo
Newcastleton, 48 South Hermitage Street (Corner With Langholm Street/Douglas Square), Bank Of Scotland				55°10′45″N 2°48′49″W	Category C(S)	51014	Upload Photo
Newcastleton, 14 Douglas Square				55°10′47″N 2°48′49″W	Category C(S)	51011	Upload Photo
Newcastleton, 4 South Hermitage Street (Corner With Union Street), Buccleuch Centre				55°10′44″N 2°48′48″W	Category C(S)	51013	Upload Photo
Liddel Bank				55°06′37″N 2°51′18″W	Category B	6413	Upload Photo
Dinlabyre Aisle, Dinlabyre, Nr Steele Road				55°13′19″N 2°44′27″W	Category B	4238	Upload Photo
Newcastleton, Douglas Square, Pant Well				55°10′47″N 2°48′46″W	Category C(S)	4254	Upload Photo
Powisholm Bridge				55°11′53″N 2°46′59″W	Category C(S)	4261	Upload Photo
Chapel, Hermitage				55°15′20″N 2°47′56″W	Category A	4255	Upload another image
Hermitage Castle				55°15′22″N 2°47′36″W	Category A	220	Upload another image
Newcastleton, 16 Douglas Square, The Grapes Hotel				55°10′48″N 2°48′48″W	Category C(S)	51012	Upload Photo

== Key ==
The scheme for classifying buildings in Scotland is:

- Category A: "buildings of national or international importance, either architectural or historic; or fine, little-altered examples of some particular period, style or building type."
- Category B: "buildings of regional or more than local importance; or major examples of some particular period, style or building type, which may have been altered."
- Category C: "buildings of local importance; lesser examples of any period, style, or building type, as originally constructed or moderately altered; and simple traditional buildings which group well with other listed buildings."

In March 2016 there were 47,288 listed buildings in Scotland. Of these, 8% were Category A, and 50% were Category B, with the remaining 42% being Category C.
