= List of listed buildings in Caddonfoot, Scottish Borders =

This is a list of listed buildings in the parish of Caddonfoot in the Scottish Borders, Scotland.

== List ==
Name	Location	Date listed	Grid ref. (Note: Sometimes known as OSGB36, the grid reference (where provided) is based on the British national grid reference system used by the Ordnance Survey. • "Guide to National Grid". Ordnance Survey. • "Get-a-map". Ordnance Survey.)	Geo-coordinates	Notes	LB number (Note: Historic Environment Scotland assign a unique alphanumeric identifier to each designated site in Scotland, for listed buildings this always begins with "LB", for example "LB12345".)	Image
Ashiesteel Bridge				55°36′22″N 2°53′33″W	Category A	1903	Upload another image
Ashiesteel				55°36′24″N 2°54′21″W	Category A	1902	Upload Photo
Torwoodlee				55°37′57″N 2°50′26″W	Category A	135	Upload another image
Peel Hospital				55°36′13″N 2°54′05″W	Category A	1904	Upload another image
Torwoodlee Tower				55°37′49″N 2°50′53″W	Category B	1910	Upload Photo
Old Fairnlee				55°35′21″N 2°51′56″W	Category B	1898	Upload Photo
Yair Bridge				55°35′01″N 2°51′40″W	Category A	1901	Upload another image See more images
Elibank House				55°37′14″N 2°57′39″W	Category B	1906	Upload Photo
Clovenfords Hotel				55°37′07″N 2°52′36″W	Category B	1907	Upload another image See more images
Statue Of Sir Walter Scott Bart, Clovenfords				55°37′06″N 2°52′36″W	Category B	1908	Upload Photo
Caddonfoot Parish Church (Church Of Scotland) Including Graveyard, Boundary Walls, Gatepiers And Gates				55°36′12″N 2°52′24″W	Category B	18	Upload Photo
Fairnilee				55°35′21″N 2°51′52″W	Category B	1897	Upload Photo
Yair House				55°35′10″N 2°52′10″W	Category A	1899	Upload another image See more images
Caddonfoot Parish Church, War Memorial				55°36′12″N 2°52′23″W	Category C(S)	45778	Upload Photo
Elibank Castle				55°37′00″N 2°57′33″W	Category B	1905	Upload Photo
Old Post Office, Clovenfords				55°37′05″N 2°52′38″W	Category B	1909	Upload Photo
Stables Yair House				55°35′07″N 2°52′10″W	Category B	1900	Upload Photo

== Key ==
The scheme for classifying buildings in Scotland is:

- Category A: "buildings of national or international importance, either architectural or historic; or fine, little-altered examples of some particular period, style or building type."
- Category B: "buildings of regional or more than local importance; or major examples of some particular period, style or building type, which may have been altered."
- Category C: "buildings of local importance; lesser examples of any period, style, or building type, as originally constructed or moderately altered; and simple traditional buildings which group well with other listed buildings."

In March 2016 there were 47,288 listed buildings in Scotland. Of these, 8% were Category A, and 50% were Category B, with the remaining 42% being Category C.
