= List of listed buildings in Swinton, Scottish Borders =

This is a list of listed buildings in the parish of Swinton in the Scottish Borders, Scotland.

== List ==
Name	Location	Date Listed	Grid Ref. (Note: Sometimes known as OSGB36, the grid reference (where provided) is based on the British national grid reference system used by the Ordnance Survey. • "Guide to National Grid". Ordnance Survey. • "Get-a-map". Ordnance Survey.)	Geo-coordinates	Notes	LB Number (Note: Historic Environment Scotland assign a unique alphanumeric identifier to each designated site in Scotland, for listed buildings this always begins with "LB", for example "LB12345".)	Image
23 (And 24) The Green, Garth Cottage				55°43′11″N 2°15′46″W	Category C(S)	45733	Upload Photo
28 The Green				55°43′12″N 2°15′46″W	Category C(S)	45736	Upload Photo
Little Swinton Farmhouse Including Ancillary Structures And Garden Walls				55°42′23″N 2°16′48″W	Category B	45739	Upload Photo
Swinton House				55°43′01″N 2°17′27″W	Category A	15339	Upload Photo
Swinton House, Dovecot				55°42′54″N 2°17′48″W	Category A	13850	Upload Photo
35 Main Street Including Former Shop				55°43′13″N 2°15′51″W	Category C(S)	45742	Upload Photo
1 - 8 (Inclusive Nos) Swinton Hill Farm Cottages Including Ancillary Structures And Garden Wall				55°42′50″N 2°14′44″W	Category C(S)	45756	Upload Photo
Swinton Hill Farmhouse Including Ancillary Structure, Walled Garden And Boundary Wall				55°42′47″N 2°14′49″W	Category B	45757	Upload Photo
Swinton Primary School Including Former Schoolhouse, Boundary Walls, Gatepiers And Gate				55°43′12″N 2°15′28″W	Category C(S)	45762	Upload Photo
Bridge Over Leet Water, South East Of Swinton House				55°42′54″N 2°17′15″W	Category C(S)	45721	Upload Photo
1 And 2 Crowfootbank Farm Cottages				55°43′32″N 2°16′36″W	Category C(S)	45723	Upload Photo
Leet Bridge, Near Swintonmill				55°42′23″N 2°17′49″W	Category B	45738	Upload Photo
1 Main Street, Beech House Including Boundary Walls, Railings, Piers, Gatepiers And Gate				55°43′10″N 2°16′05″W	Category C(S)	45740	Upload Photo
29, 31 And 33 Main Street Including Railings				55°43′13″N 2°15′52″W	Category C(S)	45741	Upload Photo
Swinton Dene Including Ancillary Structure (Former Kennels In Part)				55°42′56″N 2°17′05″W	Category C(S)	45755	Upload Photo
Crowfootbank Farmhouse Including Garden Walls				55°43′38″N 2°16′41″W	Category C(S)	45724	Upload Photo
9 The Green Orchard House				55°43′09″N 2°15′53″W	Category C(S)	45725	Upload Photo
Swinton House, Former Stables				55°43′06″N 2°17′23″W	Category B	43680	Upload Photo
Simprim Church Including Graveyard And Boundary Wall				55°42′07″N 2°14′13″W	Category C(S)	15340	Upload Photo
46 Main Street				55°43′14″N 2°15′44″W	Category C(S)	45749	Upload Photo
Swinton House, East Lodge				55°43′07″N 2°17′06″W	Category C(S)	45758	Upload Photo
Swinton House, Walled Garden Including Gatepiers, Gates, Greenhouse, Gardener's Cottage And Ancillary Structure				55°42′59″N 2°17′26″W	Category B	45761	Upload Photo
14 The Green, Greenview				55°43′10″N 2°15′51″W	Category C(S)	45728	Upload Photo
22 The Green Including Ancillary Structure				55°43′11″N 2°15′47″W	Category C(S)	45732	Upload Photo
39 Main Street, Rose Cottage				55°43′13″N 2°15′48″W	Category C(S)	45744	Upload Photo
43 Main Street Including Sundial And Boundary Wall				55°43′14″N 2°15′47″W	Category C(S)	45746	Upload Photo
1, 2 And 3 Swinton Bridge End Farm Cottages Including Ancillary Structures And Garden Walls				55°42′55″N 2°16′47″W	Category C(S)	45753	Upload Photo
Swinton Bridge End Farmhouse				55°42′51″N 2°16′56″W	Category C(S)	45754	Upload Photo
13 The Green Leithen Cottage				55°43′10″N 2°15′51″W	Category C(S)	45727	Upload Photo
26 The Green				55°43′11″N 2°15′46″W	Category C(S)	45734	Upload Photo
30 The Green				55°43′13″N 2°15′47″W	Category C(S)	45737	Upload Photo
Simprim Farm, Old Barn				55°42′03″N 2°14′26″W	Category C(S)	19667	Upload Photo
Main Street, Former Free Church, Now Village Hall, Including Boundary Wall And Piers				55°43′14″N 2°15′49″W	Category C(S)	45743	Upload Photo
36 Main Street				55°43′11″N 2°15′56″W	Category C(S)	45748	Upload Photo
48 Main Street, Beech Cottage				55°43′14″N 2°15′43″W	Category C(S)	45750	Upload Photo
Simprim Mains Farmhouse Including Ancillary Structure And Boundary Walls				55°42′21″N 2°13′28″W	Category C(S)	45752	Upload Photo
Swinton House Quadrant Walls, Railings, Piers, Gatepiers And Gates At East Lodge				55°43′07″N 2°17′05″W	Category B	45759	Upload Photo
14 Coldstream Road, Former Free Protesting Church Of Scotland				55°43′14″N 2°15′26″W	Category C(S)	45722	Upload Photo
Swinton Cross				55°43′11″N 2°15′51″W	Category B	19116	Upload Photo
10 The Green, Bothwell House				55°43′10″N 2°15′52″W	Category C(S)	45726	Upload Photo
20 The Green, Maryholm				55°43′11″N 2°15′48″W	Category C(S)	45730	Upload Photo
21 The Green				55°43′11″N 2°15′48″W	Category C(S)	45731	Upload Photo
Main Street, K6 Telephone Kiosk At Wheatsheaf Hotel Garage				55°43′12″N 2°15′55″W	Category B	15341	Upload Photo
Mountfair Farmhouse Including Boundary Wall And Gatepiers				55°43′30″N 2°13′20″W	Category B	45751	Upload Photo
Swinton House Quadrant Walls, Railings, Piers, Gatepiers And Gates At North Lodge				55°43′17″N 2°18′11″W	Category B	45760	Upload Photo
15 The Green, Glencairn				55°43′10″N 2°15′50″W	Category C(S)	45729	Upload Photo
27 The Green				55°43′12″N 2°15′46″W	Category C(S)	45735	Upload Photo
Swinton Church, Church Of Scotland, Including Graveyard, Boundary Wall, Gatepiers And Gates				55°43′19″N 2°15′30″W	Category B	15338	Upload Photo
41 Main Street Candlemas Cottage Including Boundary Wall				55°43′14″N 2°15′48″W	Category C(S)	45745	Upload Photo
47 Main Street				55°43′14″N 2°15′46″W	Category C(S)	45747	Upload Photo

== Key ==
The scheme for classifying buildings in Scotland is:

- Category A: "buildings of national or international importance, either architectural or historic; or fine, little-altered examples of some particular period, style or building type."
- Category B: "buildings of regional or more than local importance; or major examples of some particular period, style or building type, which may have been altered."
- Category C: "buildings of local importance; lesser examples of any period, style, or building type, as originally constructed or moderately altered; and simple traditional buildings which group well with other listed buildings."

In March 2016 there were 47,288 listed buildings in Scotland. Of these, 8% were Category A, and 50% were Category B, with the remaining 42% being Category C.
