= List of listed buildings in Eyemouth, Scottish Borders =

This is a list of listed buildings in the parish of Eyemouth in the Scottish Borders, Scotland.

== List ==
Name	Location	Date Listed	Grid Ref. (Note: Sometimes known as OSGB36, the grid reference (where provided) is based on the British national grid reference system used by the Ordnance Survey. • "Guide to National Grid". Ordnance Survey. • "Get-a-map". Ordnance Survey.)	Geo-coordinates	Notes	LB Number (Note: Historic Environment Scotland assign a unique alphanumeric identifier to each designated site in Scotland, for listed buildings this always begins with "LB", for example "LB12345".)	Image
3, 4, 5 Armatage Street				55°52′20″N 2°05′26″W	Category C(S)	31119	Upload Photo
7-11 Armatage Street				55°52′20″N 2°05′25″W	Category C(S)	31121	Upload Photo
11 Church Street, Chester House				55°52′17″N 2°05′22″W	Category A	31128	Upload Photo
6 High Street J Thomson Hairdressers				55°52′21″N 2°05′23″W	Category C(S)	31144	Upload another image
Market Place Wilbara House And R A Mcivor Chemist				55°52′21″N 2°05′21″W	Category B	31147	Upload Photo
49 6 St Ella's Place				55°52′21″N 2°05′19″W	Category C(S)	31161	Upload Photo
12, 13, 14 St Ella's Place				55°52′22″N 2°05′20″W	Category B	31163	Upload Photo
Victoria Road Eyemouth Parish Church				55°52′11″N 2°05′28″W	Category C(S)	31166	Upload Photo
9 Church Street				55°52′17″N 2°05′22″W	Category C(S)	31127	Upload Photo
7 High Street And David Allan Newsagent				55°52′20″N 2°05′24″W	Category C(S)	31141	Upload Photo
1 Marine Parade (Eyemouth Harbour Trust)				55°52′22″N 2°05′14″W	Category C(S)	31149	Upload Photo
New Quay Eyemouth Harbour				55°52′19″N 2°05′12″W	Category C(S)	31153	Upload Photo
3 Old Quay Harbour Road				55°52′22″N 2°05′14″W	Category C(S)	31154	Upload Photo
Old Quay Harbour Road Joiners' Yard To Rear Of No 4 Old Quay (Cook And Martin Joiners)				55°52′22″N 2°05′14″W	Category C(S)	31156	Upload Photo
Linthill House				55°51′39″N 2°07′08″W	Category B	10489	Upload Photo
18 Albert Road Viewfield Cottage				55°52′16″N 2°05′25″W	Category C(S)	31115	Upload Photo
6 Armatage Street				55°52′20″N 2°05′26″W	Category C(S)	31120	Upload Photo
13 Church Street				55°52′17″N 2°05′22″W	Category C(S)	31129	Upload Photo
36 Church Street				55°52′14″N 2°05′24″W	Category C(S)	31132	Upload Photo
Gunsgreen House Gatepiers And Gates				55°52′19″N 2°05′10″W	Category C(S)	31135	Upload Photo
4, 6 Market Place Including Eyemouth Library				55°52′19″N 2°05′21″W	Category B	31146	Upload Photo
Old Quay Harbour Road The Whale Hotel				55°52′21″N 2°05′15″W	Category C(S)	31157	Upload Photo
8 St Ella's Place And 2 St Ella's Wynd				55°52′22″N 2°05′19″W	Category C(S)	31162	Upload Photo
12, 14, 16 Albert Road St John's House				55°52′15″N 2°05′25″W	Category B	31114	Upload Photo
Brown's Bank Eyemouth Boatbuilding Co				55°52′09″N 2°05′23″W	Category C(S)	31122	Upload Photo
1 Chapel Street				55°52′20″N 2°05′21″W	Category C(S)	31123	Upload Photo
28, 29, 30 Harbour Road				55°52′16″N 2°05′19″W	Category C(S)	31136	Upload Photo
High Street And Albert Road Old Churchyard And Watch-House				55°52′23″N 2°05′31″W	Category B	31142	Upload Photo
2 Market Place And Masons Wynd				55°52′19″N 2°05′21″W	Category B	31145	Upload Photo
Market Place, Hurkar, Gift Shop				55°52′21″N 2°05′22″W	Category C(S)	31148	Upload Photo
Old Quay Harbour Road Royal National Mission To Deep Sea Fishermen				55°52′20″N 2°05′15″W	Category B	31159	Upload Photo
Albert Road Community Centre				55°52′15″N 2°05′27″W	Category C(S)	31113	Upload Photo
7, 7A And 9 Chapel Street, 2, 4 Queen Street, 2, 4, St Ella's Place				55°52′20″N 2°05′19″W	Category C(S)	31125	Upload Photo
Church Street. Former Eyemouth Parish Church				55°52′19″N 2°05′20″W	Category B	31126	Upload Photo
Church Street Burgh Chambers				55°52′18″N 2°05′23″W	Category B	31130	Upload Photo
Church Street Evangelical Union Congregational Church				55°52′16″N 2°05′24″W	Category C(S)	31131	Upload Photo
2, 4 High Street T C Maltman & Son				55°52′21″N 2°05′23″W	Category C(S)	31143	Upload Photo
St Ella's Wynd Aitcheson Brothers				55°52′22″N 2°05′19″W	Category C(S)	31165	Upload Photo
58 Albert Road And Ridley's Fish And Chip Shop				55°52′19″N 2°05′27″W	Category C(S)	31116	Upload Photo
Albert Road Jasmine Cottage				55°52′22″N 2°05′32″W	Category C(S)	31117	Upload Photo
Gunsgreen House And Terrace Retaining Wall. (Eyemouth Golf Club And Border Sailing Club)				55°52′21″N 2°05′08″W	Category A	31133	Upload another image See more images
49 Harbour Road And 1 Victoria Road				55°52′10″N 2°05′25″W	Category C(S)	31140	Upload Photo
Old Quay Harbour Road Collinville				55°52′20″N 2°05′14″W	Category C(S)	31158	Upload Photo
13, 14, 15 St Ella's Wynd And 1 Todds Court				55°52′22″N 2°05′19″W	Category C(S)	31164	Upload Photo
1, 2 Armatage Street				55°52′21″N 2°05′25″W	Category C(S)	31118	Upload Photo
Chapel Street Wm Scott & Son				55°52′21″N 2°05′21″W	Category C(S)	31124	Upload Photo
Gunsgreen House Dovecote				55°52′18″N 2°05′08″W	Category B	31134	Upload Photo
31-33 Harbour Road				55°52′15″N 2°05′20″W	Category C(S)	31137	Upload Photo
34 Harbour Road				55°52′15″N 2°05′21″W	Category C(S)	31138	Upload Photo
Harbour Road Eyemouth Boat Building Co And Marine Radio				55°52′11″N 2°05′23″W	Category B	31139	Upload Photo
2,3 Marine Parade				55°52′22″N 2°05′14″W	Category C(S)	31150	Upload Photo
Mason's Wynd John Waddell Fish Merchant, Fish Smoking House				55°52′19″N 2°05′20″W	Category C(S)	31152	Upload Photo
4 Old Quay Harbour Road 'The Contented Sole'				55°52′22″N 2°05′13″W	Category C(S)	31155	Upload Photo
Old Quay Harbour Road Ship Hotel				55°52′19″N 2°05′16″W	Category B	31160	Upload Photo

== Key ==
The scheme for classifying buildings in Scotland is:

- Category A: "buildings of national or international importance, either architectural or historic; or fine, little-altered examples of some particular period, style or building type."
- Category B: "buildings of regional or more than local importance; or major examples of some particular period, style or building type, which may have been altered."
- Category C: "buildings of local importance; lesser examples of any period, style, or building type, as originally constructed or moderately altered; and simple traditional buildings which group well with other listed buildings."

In March 2016 there were 47,288 listed buildings in Scotland. Of these, 8% were Category A, and 50% were Category B, with the remaining 42% being Category C.
