= List of listed buildings in Westruther, Scottish Borders =

This is a list of listed buildings in the parish of Westruther in the Scottish Borders, Scotland.

== List ==
| Name | Location | Date Listed | Grid Ref. (Note: Sometimes known as OSGB36, the grid reference (where provided) is based on the British national grid reference system used by the Ordnance Survey. • "Guide to National Grid". Ordnance Survey. • "Get-a-map". Ordnance Survey.) | Geo-coordinates | Notes | LB Number (Note: Historic Environment Scotland assign a unique alphanumeric identifier to each designated site in Scotland, for listed buildings this always begins with "LB", for example "LB12345".) | Image |
|---|---|---|---|---|---|---|---|
| Spottiswoode, Stable Block, Groom's House, Dog Kennel, "Bear's Den", Glasshouse, Sundial And Rustic Shelter In Walled Garden, Icehouse, Doocot And Well, And Boundary Walls To Former Spottiswoode House | | | | 55°44′23″N 2°37′53″W | Category B | 19653 | Upload Photo |
| Wedderlie House | | | | 55°45′21″N 2°34′34″W | Category A | 19740 | Upload another image |
| Bassendean House | | | | 55°42′18″N 2°35′37″W | Category B | 15345 | Upload Photo |
| Spottiswoode, Pyatshaw Archway | | | | 55°43′32″N 2°39′49″W | Category C(S) | 19651 | Upload Photo |
| Spottiswoode, Bruntaburn Archway | | | | 55°44′22″N 2°38′29″W | Category C(S) | 19652 | Upload Photo |
| Spottiswoode, West Lodge | | | | 55°44′22″N 2°38′28″W | Category C(S) | 17418 | Upload Photo |
| Spottiswoode, Eagle Or Clock Lodges | | | | 55°43′11″N 2°37′15″W | Category B | 19654 | Upload Photo |
| Ruin Of Old Church And Graveyard, Westruther | | | | 55°44′33″N 2°35′03″W | Category B | 15343 | Upload Photo |
| Ruin Of Bassendean Church (St Mary) | | | | 55°42′13″N 2°35′20″W | Category B | 15344 | Upload Photo |
| The Old Thistle Inn, Westruther | | | | 55°44′32″N 2°35′05″W | Category B | 15346 | Upload Photo |
| Evelaw Tower | | | | 55°45′55″N 2°32′30″W | Category B | 17419 | Upload Photo |
| Coach Building Wedderlie | | | | 55°45′23″N 2°34′30″W | Category B | 15347 | Upload Photo |

== Key ==
The scheme for classifying buildings in Scotland is:

- Category A: "buildings of national or international importance, either architectural or historic; or fine, little-altered examples of some particular period, style or building type."
- Category B: "buildings of regional or more than local importance; or major examples of some particular period, style or building type, which may have been altered."
- Category C: "buildings of local importance; lesser examples of any period, style, or building type, as originally constructed or moderately altered; and simple traditional buildings which group well with other listed buildings."

In March 2016 there were 47,288 listed buildings in Scotland. Of these, 8% were Category A, and 50% were Category B, with the remaining 42% being Category C.
