= List of listed buildings in Hobkirk, Scottish Borders =

This is a list of listed buildings in the parish of Hobkirk in the Scottish Borders, Scotland.

== List ==
Name	Location	Date listed	Grid ref. (Note: Sometimes known as OSGB36, the grid reference (where provided) is based on the British national grid reference system used by the Ordnance Survey. • "Guide to National Grid". Ordnance Survey. • "Get-a-map". Ordnance Survey.)	Geo-coordinates	Notes	LB number (Note: Historic Environment Scotland assign a unique alphanumeric identifier to each designated site in Scotland, for listed buildings this always begins with "LB", for example "LB12345".)	Image
Hobkirk Parish Church (Church Of Scotland) With Graveyard, Boundary Walls, Gates And Gatepiers				55°23′25″N 2°39′11″W	Category C(S)	8396	Upload Photo
Hobkirk, Nether Swansheil House And Steading (Former Hobkirk Manse) Including Boundary Walls				55°23′16″N 2°39′19″W	Category B	50111	Upload Photo
Weens				55°24′27″N 2°39′10″W	Category B	10791	Upload Photo
Cleugh Head Farm				55°23′01″N 2°38′35″W	Category B	8372	Upload Photo
Harwood				55°22′01″N 2°41′14″W	Category B	8371	Upload Photo
Hobsburn				55°23′59″N 2°39′40″W	Category B	8367	Upload Photo
Entrance Gates And Lodge, Wells House				55°27′05″N 2°38′15″W	Category B	8370	Upload Photo

== Key ==
The scheme for classifying buildings in Scotland is:

- Category A: "buildings of national or international importance, either architectural or historic; or fine, little-altered examples of some particular period, style or building type."
- Category B: "buildings of regional or more than local importance; or major examples of some particular period, style or building type, which may have been altered."
- Category C: "buildings of local importance; lesser examples of any period, style, or building type, as originally constructed or moderately altered; and simple traditional buildings which group well with other listed buildings."

In March 2016 there were 47,288 listed buildings in Scotland. Of these, 8% were Category A, and 50% were Category B, with the remaining 42% being Category C.
