= List of listed buildings in Nenthorn, Scottish Borders =

This is a list of listed buildings in the parish of Nenthorn in the Scottish Borders, Scotland.

== List ==
| Name | Location | Date listed | Geo-coordinates | Notes | Category | LB number | Image |
|---|---|---|---|---|---|---|---|
| Newton Don | | | 55°37′39″N 2°27′49″W | | A | 15220 | Upload another image |
| Harrietfield | | | 55°37′10″N 2°27′48″W | | C(S) | 13858 | Upload Photo |
| Sundial, Newton Don | | | 55°37′38″N 2°27′47″W | | B | 15221 | Upload Photo |
| Hundy Mundy | | | 55°37′50″N 2°32′29″W | | B | 19730 | Upload Photo |
| Stables, Newton Don | | | 55°37′43″N 2°27′55″W | | B | 19731 | Upload Photo |
| Newton Don, East Lodge With Gates And Gatepiers | | | 55°37′30″N 2°27′11″W | | B | 15223 | Upload Photo |
| Garden Gate, Newton Don | | | 55°37′37″N 2°27′51″W | | B | 15222 | Upload Photo |

== Key ==
The scheme for classifying buildings in Scotland is:

- Category A: "buildings of national or international importance, either architectural or historic; or fine, little-altered examples of some particular period, style or building type."
- Category B: "buildings of regional or more than local importance; or major examples of some particular period, style or building type, which may have been altered."
- Category C: "buildings of local importance; lesser examples of any period, style, or building type, as originally constructed or moderately altered; and simple traditional buildings which group well with other listed buildings."

In March 2016 there were 47,288 listed buildings in Scotland. Of these, 8% were Category A, and 50% were Category B, with the remaining 42% being Category C.
