= Church of St Anne, Aigburth =

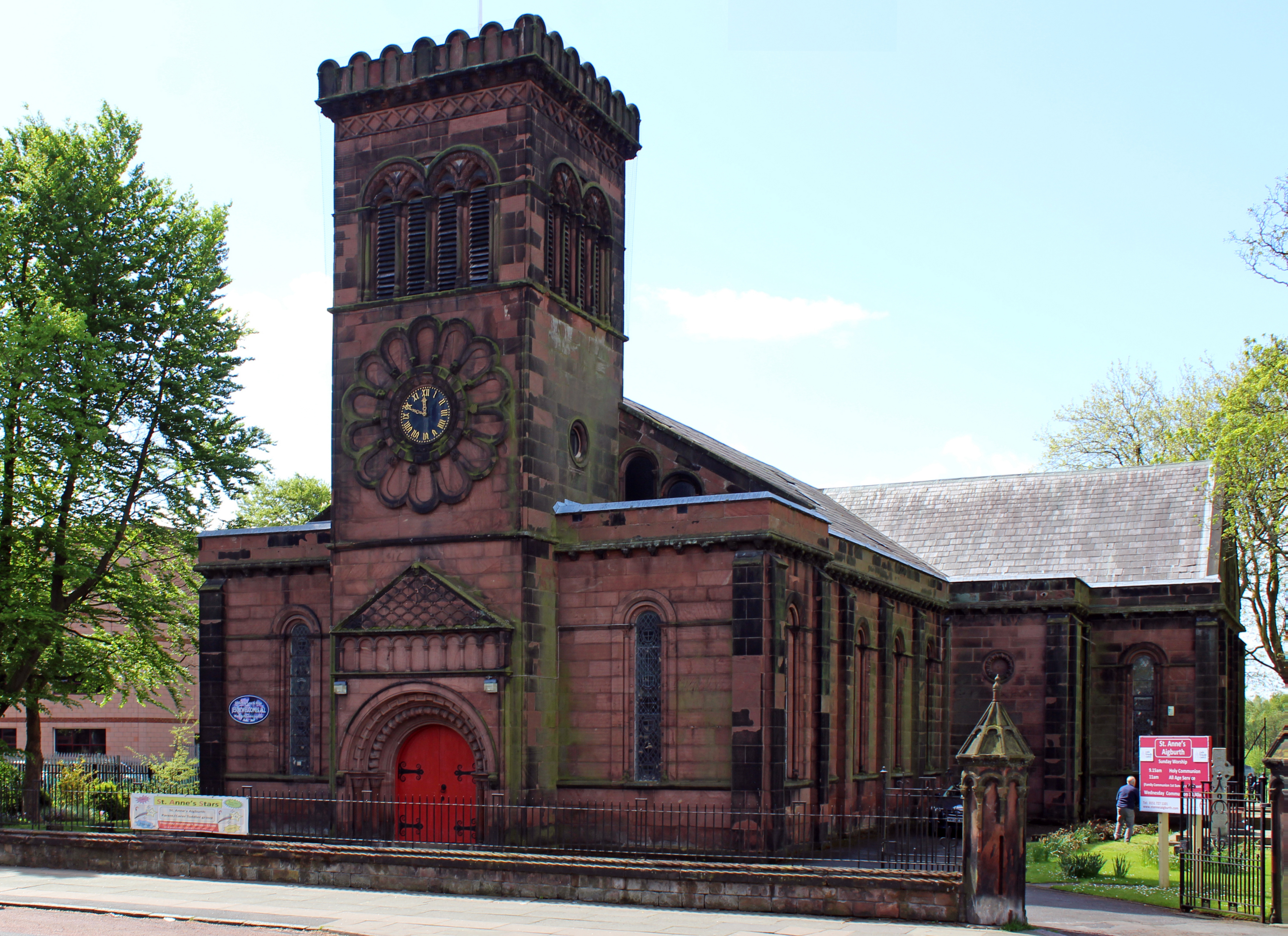
- Church of St Anne, Aigburth, west end
- Church of St Anne, Aigburth
- 53.3694°N 2.9305°W
- OS grid reference: SJ 381 862
- Location: Aigburth, Liverpool, Merseyside
- Country: England
- Denomination: Anglican
- Website: St Anne's, Aigburth

History
- Former name: Aigburth Church
- Status: Parish church
- Founded: 1836
- Founder(s): John Moss, Charles Stewart Parker, John Abraham Tinne, Josias Booker
- Consecrated: 30th October 1837

Architecture
- Functional status: Active
- Heritage designation: Grade II*
- Designated: 12 July 1966
- Architect(s): Cunningham & Holme
- Architectural type: Church
- Style: Norman Revival
- Groundbreaking: 1836

Specifications
- Materials: Ashlar stone, slate roof

Administration
- Province: York
- Diocese: Liverpool
- Archdeaconry: Liverpool
- Deanery: Liverpool South Childwall
- Parish: Aigburth: St Anne

Clergy
- Vicar: Philippa Lea

The Church of St Anne is in Aigburth Road, Aigburth, Liverpool, Merseyside, England. It is recorded in the National Heritage List for England as a designated Grade II* listed building, and is an active Anglican parish church in the diocese of Liverpool, the archdeaconry of Liverpool and the deanery of Liverpool South Childwall. Its architecture is an early example of the Norman Revival style.

== History ==
The church was built in 1836–37 to a design by Cunningham & Holme. It was founded by a group of local merchants, John Moss, Charles Stewart Parker, John Abraham Tinne and Josias Booker and was consecrated in 1837. In 1853–54 broad transepts were added and the chancel was extended. The north and south galleries were removed in 1893–94 and in 1913–14 the chancel was further extended.

The church was damaged in an arson attack by Suffragettes on 16 December 1913. The altar and choir stalls were burned during a period when this movement to obtain votes for women was increasingly militant.

On 12 January 2025, Pam Knowles achieved a Guinness World Record by becoming the longest serving Sunday School teacher in the world, she has taught at St. Anne's for over 73 years.

== Architecture ==
The church is built in ashlar stone with a slate roof in Norman Revival style. Its plan consists of a west tower flanked by a baptistry to the north and a stair bay to the south, a four-bay nave, north and south transepts, and a three-bay chancel with the organ loft to the north and a vestry to the south. The round-headed entrance is in the base of the tower with blind arcading and a diapered gable above it. Over this is a clock face surrounded by a large rose motif. The tower has paired two-light bell openings on each face over which is a cornice with corbels and a parapet with blind arcading. The east window consists of three lancets and a rose window. The west gallery is still present as are the galleries in the transepts.

== External features ==
The gate piers are listed at Grade II. There are two pairs of gate piers, which are made in stone, and are also Norman Revival in style. They are octagonal, with features including arcading, corbels, and finials.

== Community ==
The church adjoins St Margaret's Church of England Academy and is used at times as the venue for carol and other services.

== Images ==
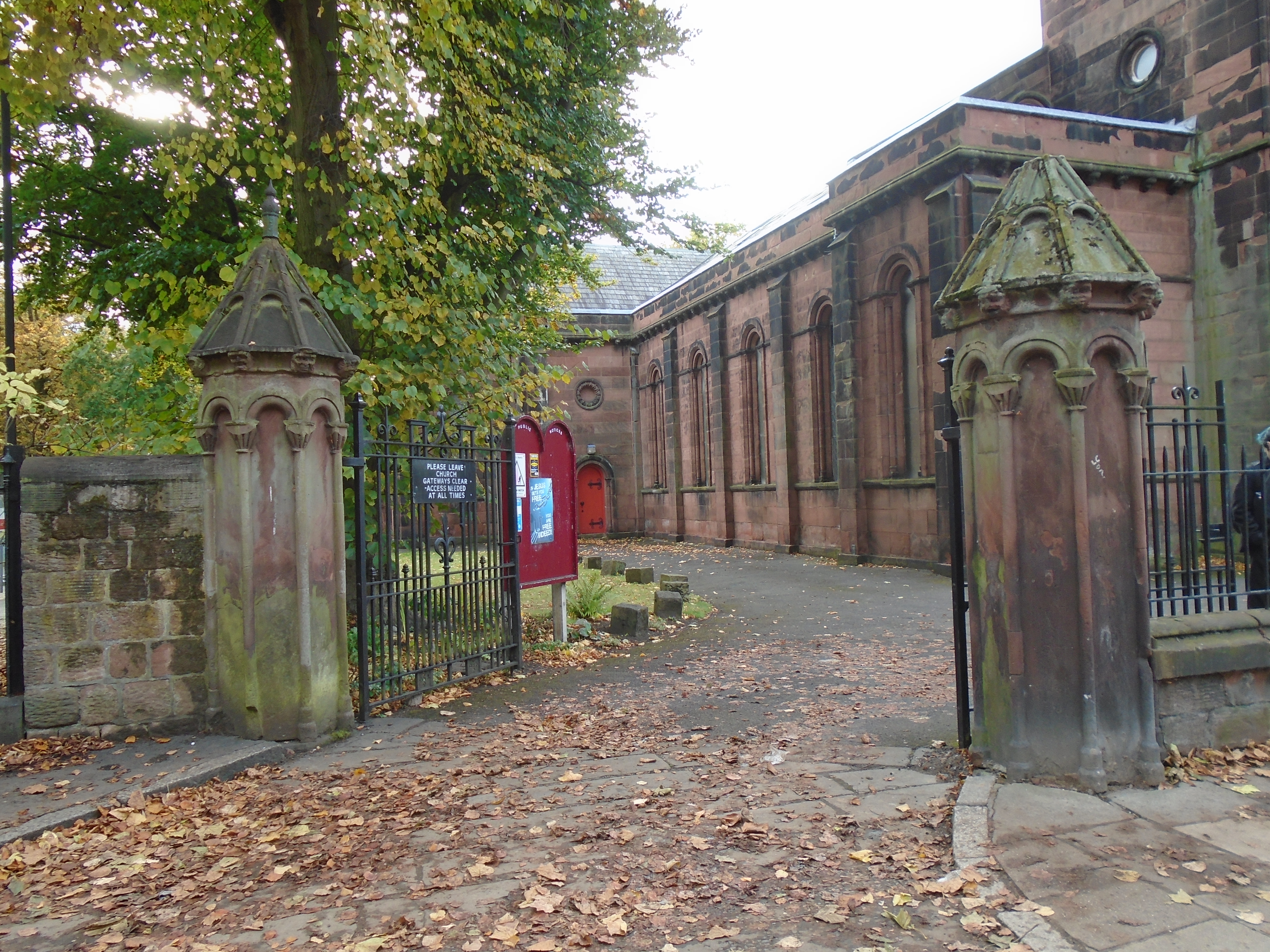
Grade II listed gatepiers

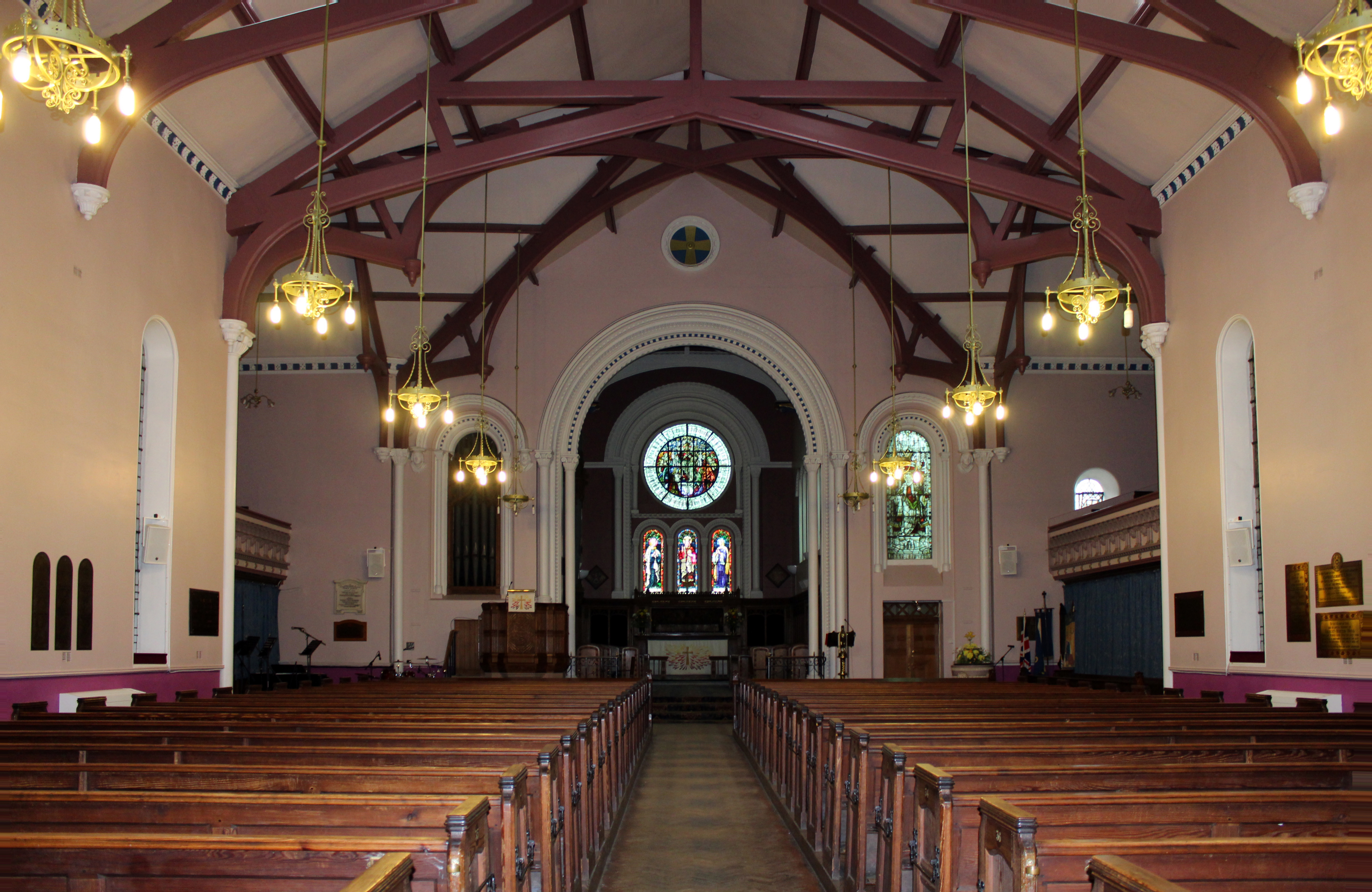
Looking along the nave towards the chancel

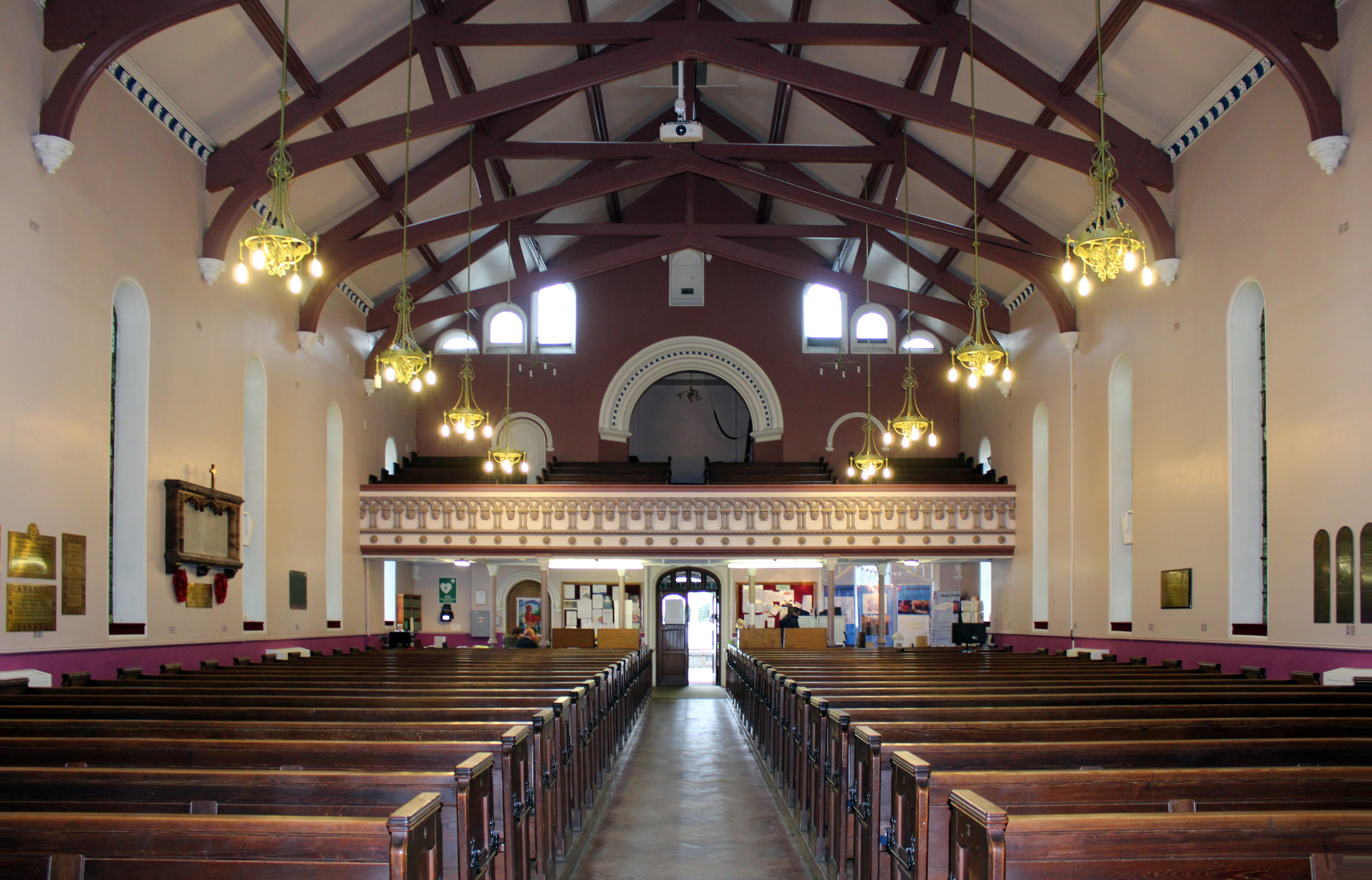
Looking along the nave towards the west end

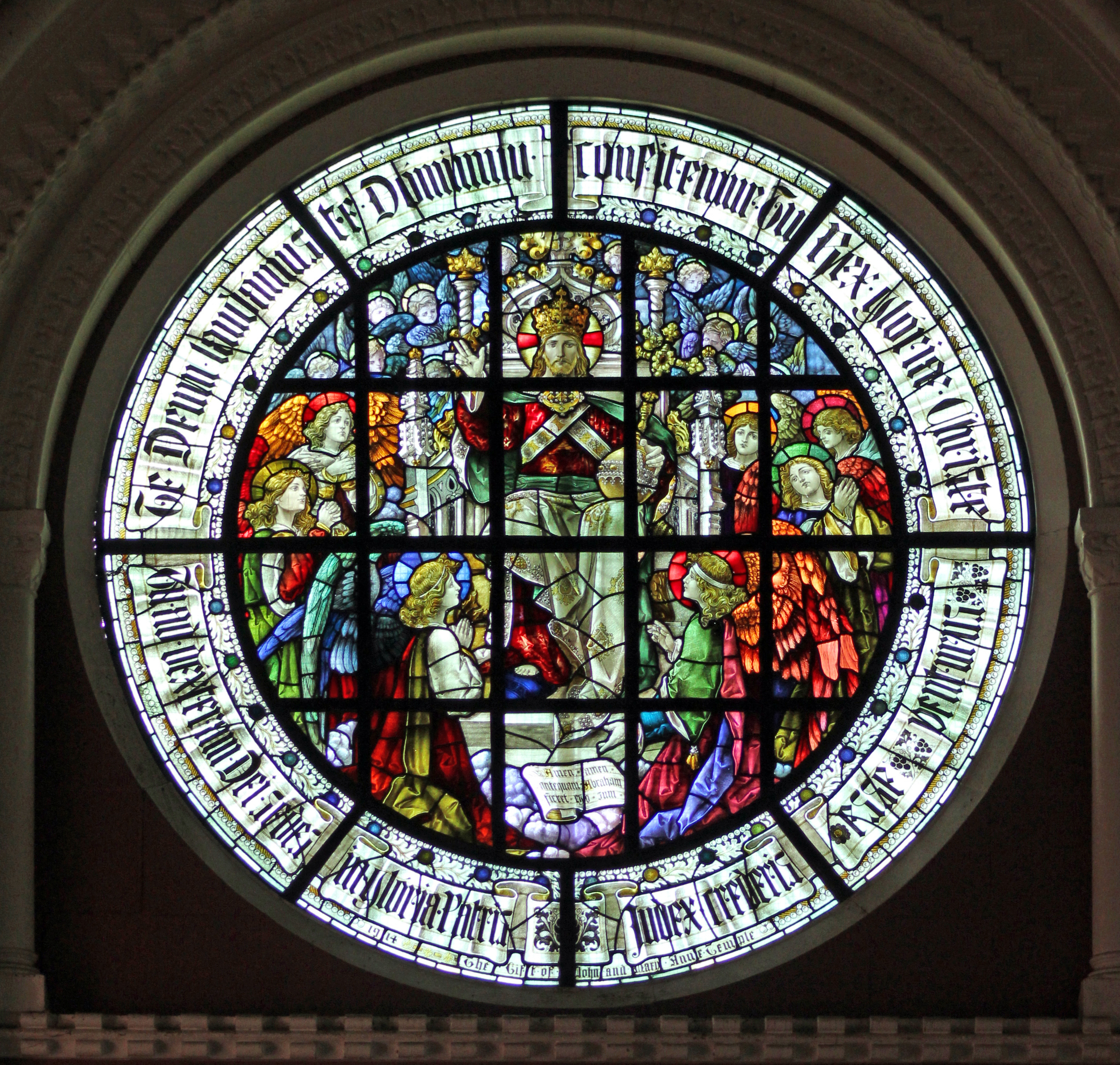
Circular part of the east window

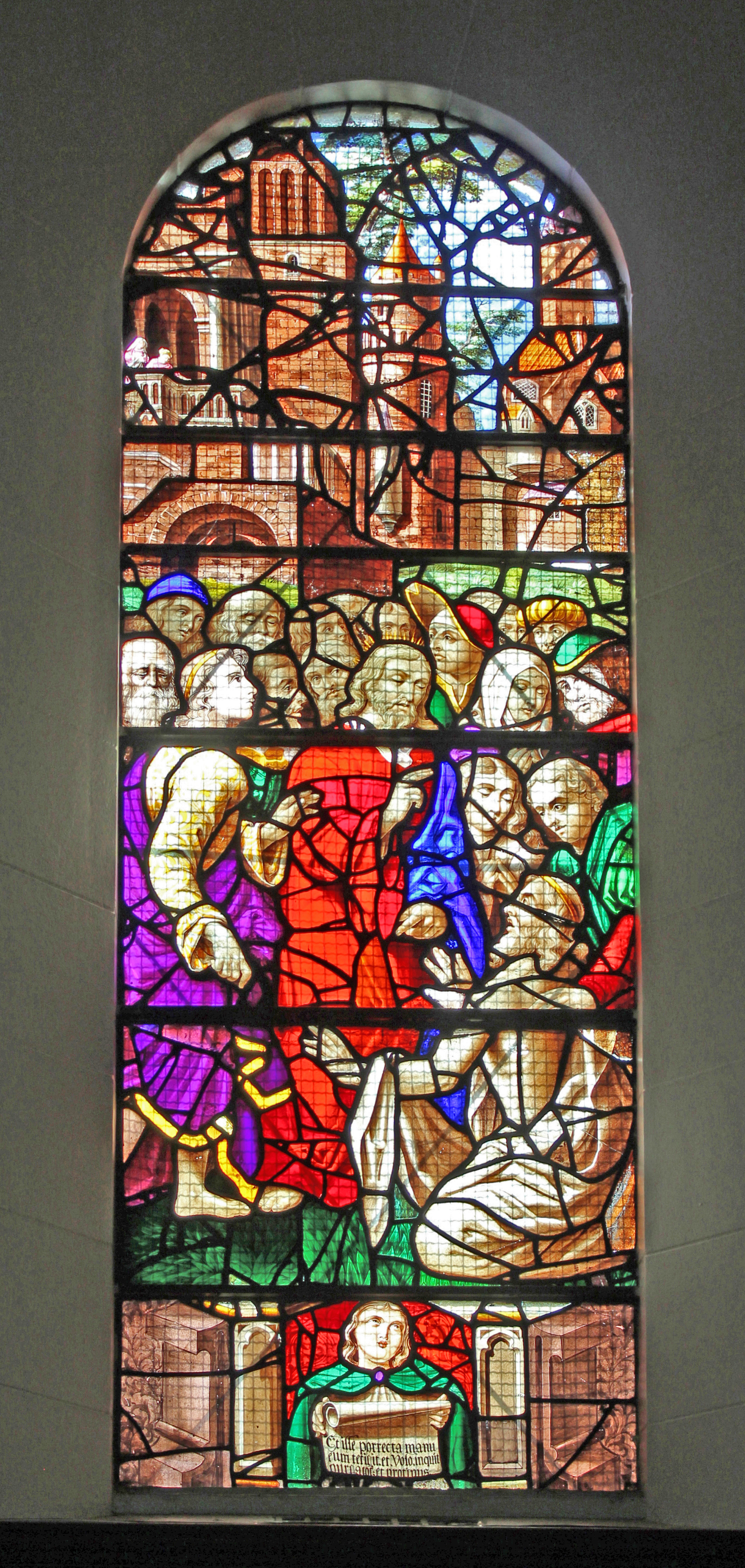
Sanctuary window showing Jesus cleansing the leper

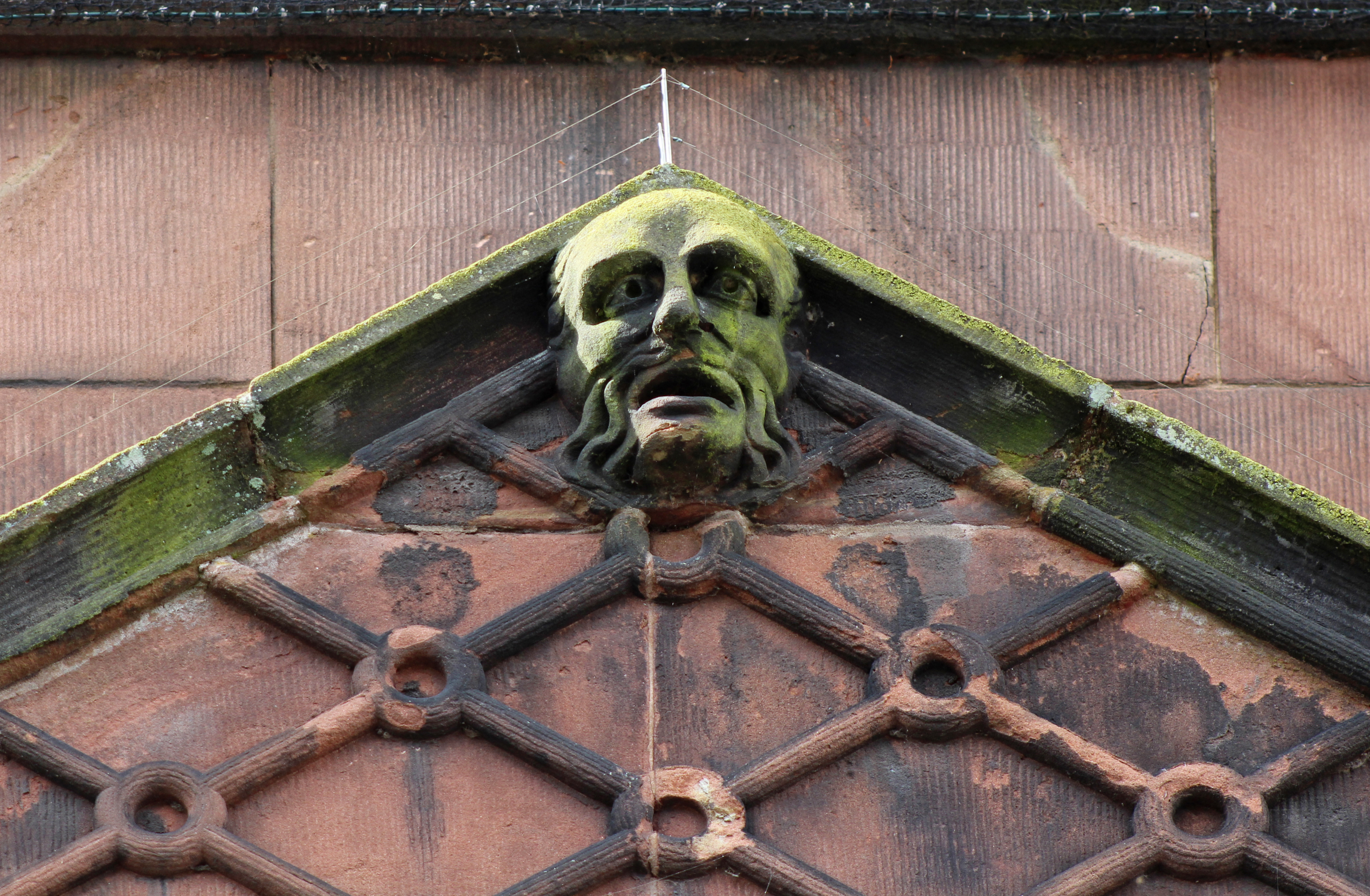
Carving of a grotesque on the west end

== See also ==
- Grade II* listed buildings in Merseyside
