= List of listed buildings in Greenlaw, Scottish Borders =

This is a list of listed buildings in the parish of Greenlaw in the Scottish Borders, Scotland.

== List ==
Name	Location	Date Listed	Grid Ref. (Note: Sometimes known as OSGB36, the grid reference (where provided) is based on the British national grid reference system used by the Ordnance Survey. • "Guide to National Grid". Ordnance Survey. • "Get-a-map". Ordnance Survey.)	Geo-coordinates	Notes	LB Number (Note: Historic Environment Scotland assign a unique alphanumeric identifier to each designated site in Scotland, for listed buildings this always begins with "LB", for example "LB12345".)	Image
Rowchester House Including Garden Terrace Walled Garden, Gates And Gatepiers				55°41′16″N 2°25′30″W	Category B	50748	Upload Photo
Greenlaw, Market Cross				55°42′25″N 2°27′39″W	Category A	6823	Upload another image
Whiteside Farm				55°42′47″N 2°27′09″W	Category B	10482	Upload Photo
Gordonbank				55°41′04″N 2°26′22″W	Category B	10483	Upload Photo
Greenlaw Church				55°42′29″N 2°27′38″W	Category A	10490	Upload another image See more images
Castle Inn And Supporting Coach House Wings Forming Courtyard				55°42′23″N 2°27′39″W	Category A	10493	Upload Photo
Roweston Cottage				55°42′13″N 2°24′53″W	Category B	10494	Upload Photo
Lambden House				55°40′59″N 2°24′36″W	Category B	51063	Upload Photo
Old Market Cross In Churchyard				55°42′28″N 2°27′38″W	Category A	10491	Upload another image
Court House Greenlaw				55°42′26″N 2°27′39″W	Category A	10492	Upload another image See more images

== Key ==
The scheme for classifying buildings in Scotland is:

- Category A: "buildings of national or international importance, either architectural or historic; or fine, little-altered examples of some particular period, style or building type."
- Category B: "buildings of regional or more than local importance; or major examples of some particular period, style or building type, which may have been altered."
- Category C: "buildings of local importance; lesser examples of any period, style, or building type, as originally constructed or moderately altered; and simple traditional buildings which group well with other listed buildings."

In March 2016 there were 47,288 listed buildings in Scotland. Of these, 8% were Category A, and 50% were Category B, with the remaining 42% being Category C.
