= Liverpool Sailors' Home =

Demolished building in Liverpool

Coordinates: 53.402°N 2.988°W

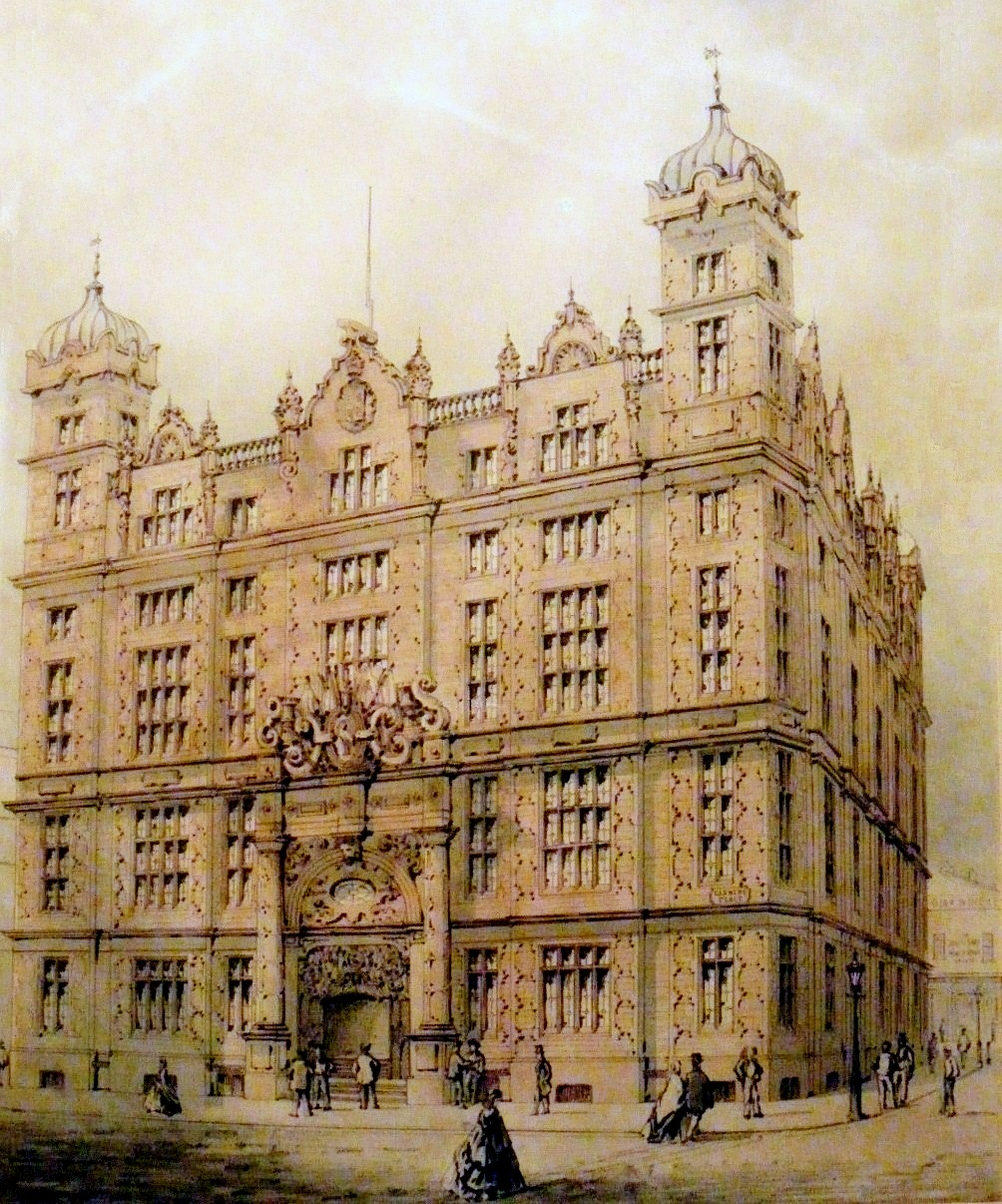
Liverpool Sailors' Home (Victorian illustration)

Liverpool Sailors' Home, was open for business in Canning Place, Liverpool, England, from December 1850 to July 1969. The home was designed to provide safe, inexpensive lodging for sailors, and to offer educational and recreational opportunities, in contrast to the temptations on offer in the docklands area.

The building was demolished in 1974, a few years after its closure in 1969. Decorative features were preserved. Mermaid Railings from the Home (Acquired by Clough Williams-Ellis C1950 when a floor was installed at first floor balcony level.) can be seen in Portmeirion in North Wales.

The wrought iron gates were sold in 1951 to Avery in Birmingham and were on view at their museum located in the historic Soho Foundry until 2011. During their working years the gates had been associated with two deaths, helping to create the story of subsequent hauntings around Canning Place. In 2011 the gates were returned to Liverpool and installed as "The Sailors' Home Gateway" near their original location in Liverpool One, as a monument to the thousands of Merchant Seamen that had passed through them during the nearly 120 years the Sailors' Home operated.

The sandstone Liver Bird originally at the centre of the flamboyantly carved decoration above the doorway can be found in the Museum of Liverpool.

== History ==
The Liverpool Sailors’ Home project was launched at a public meeting called by the Mayor of Liverpool in October 1844.

The need for a Sailors’ Home had been identified:

to provide for seamen frequenting the port of Liverpool, board, lodging and medical attendance, at a moderate charge; to protect them from imposition and extortion, and to encourage them to husband their hard-earned wages; to promote their moral, intellectual, and professional improvement; and to afford them the opportunity of receiving religious instruction. A reading-room, library, and savings bank will be attached to the institution; and with a view to securing to the able and well-conducted seamen a rate of wages proportionate to his merits, a registry of character will be kept. Among the ulterior objects in contemplation are schools for sea-apprentices, and the sons of seamen, with special regard to the care of children who have lost one or both their parents receiving religious instruction.

As well as providing safe accommodation for an average of 200 men each night, the home provided a vital service, introducing professional, experienced merchant seamen to captains of safe seaworthy vessels. This combined with the expansions of its docks, greatly improving the reputation and efficiency of Liverpool as a merchant port.

== Construction ==
Liverpool-based architect John Cunningham (1799–1873) was involved with the Liverpool Sailors’ Home project from the institution’s inception, having been appointed architect of the building in 1844 even before land for the building had been secured.

Originally from Scotland, from his arrival in the city in 1834 until his retirement in 1872, Cunningham designed a number of the City's most important buildings including the first railway stations at Edge Hill and Lime Street, the first Philharmonic Hall and the Liverpool Sailors’ Home. The Home was created in the neo-Elizabethan Tudor style.

During the construction of The Liverpool Sailors' Home (1845–52), it is clear from contemporary reports that John Cunningham, worked closely with Henry Pooley Jnr. on the designs of the iron-work:

"three tiers of ornamental cast-iron pilasters with an intermediate range of galleries, filled in with ornamental cast-iron work depicting nautical themes characteristic of the purpose of the building, thereby forming six floors for dormitories, capable of accommodating on each floor forty-four cabins."

Pooley and Cunningham also worked together to re-build the Homes' interior following the disastrous fire of April 1860 which closed the building for two years.

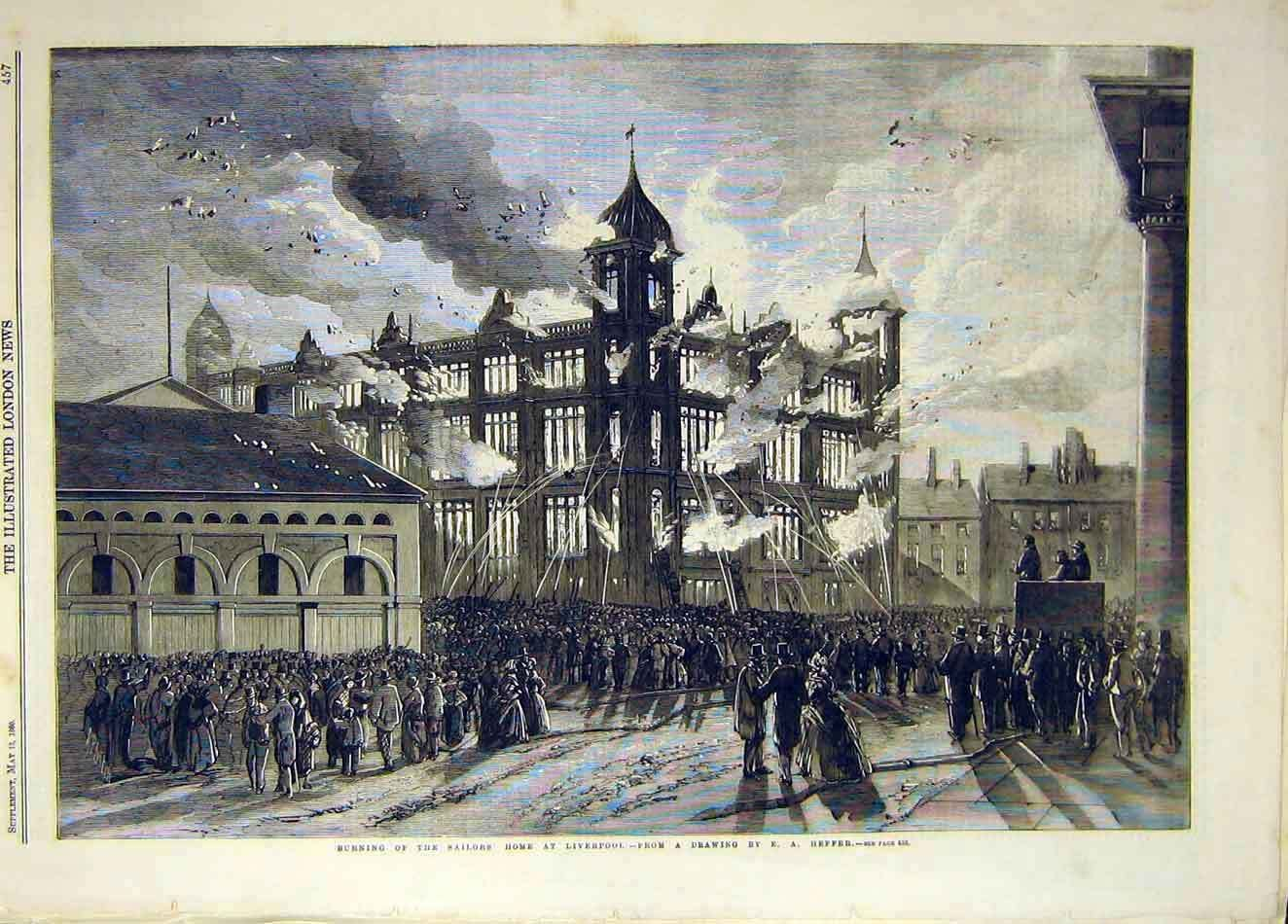
The Destruction of the Liverpool Sailors' Home on 12 May 1860

Despite later accounts of his success, Pooley's relationship with the Home was not always a smooth one. Pooley’s heating apparatus for the building was not finished on time and even when completed, for the Homes’ belated opening in the winter of 1852, was described by the Sailors’ Home Committee as not fit for purpose.

== The Gates ==
The entrance gates to the Sailors' Home were elaborate decorative pieces of ironwork which served the dual purpose of protecting the Savings Bank and keeping out seamen who might wish to gain entry to the Home after the strict 10 pm curfew.

By April 1852 the lower sections of the gates had been installed, decorated with a combination of elements from the interior balconies; four great panels of rope-work with central mermaid and trident figures identical to those inside. The two outer panels were fixed whilst the two centre sections rolled behind them on rails where they were hidden from sight while the Home was open for business.

The iron-work of the lower gates, being on such a large scale, produced a solid, intimidating aspect compared with the much lighter appearance of the balcony railings. The huge mass of iron made an impassable barrier but also a massive weight and it would have taken some effort to slide the gates open and close. The upper part of the gates which reflect the sandstone carvings above the entrance were added later and show a much lighter touch, using the spaces between the iron to great effect. The Minutes of Sailors' Home Management Committee contain the following entry:

25 April 1852– "Mr. Akin laid upon the Table a note from Mr. Pooley and 2 notes from Mr. Cunningham with a plan for supporting the arch over front gate way. When the superintendent expressed his fears as to the consequences which might result from the proposed spikes upon the top of the gate to drunken belated boarders, and also as to the sufficiency of pillar supports resting upon the top of the gate itself. After some consideration, the matter was referred to Mr. Mann who kindly offered to consult with Mr. Cunningham. "By the following meeting on May 3 Cunningham had confirmed that he would alter the plan for supporting the front arch and on May 24 he was given permission to proceed with the alterations to the front gateway. It was agreed that Mr. Pooley would have the contract.

Although spikes, so frowned on by the Committee, were fixed to the top of the original gates, Cunningham and Pooley's new upper section elegantly blocked all the area above the entrance making access impossible when the gates were closed. They also supported the stone work of the entrance arch, which appears to have had a structural weakness.

=== 1852: An Unfortunate Death of Mary Ann Price ===
The Minutes of Sailors' Home Management Committee, contain the following entry:

“1852 July 14 - "Mr. Cunningham and Mr. Pooley were present in reference to the accident of the falling of the outer gate upon Mrs Price, causing her death. From the explanations given, it seems to have arisen in the neglect of Mr. Pooley's foreman to replace the stop which was carried away when the gate fell before and in the hook attached to the chain having by frequent jerking opened and become detached from the loop upon the gate. Resolved - That Mr. Cunningham & Mr. Pooley arrange an effectual stop for front gate, and that they give a note conjointly, to the effect that the gate shall be made perfectly secure."

The report of the inquest before P.F.Curry on the death of Mrs Price, which appeared in The Liverpool Courier July 14, 1852 failed to mention Pooley's neglect:

Mary Ann Price, 52 years of age. John Price, the husband of the deceased, is porter at the Sailors' Home. On the night of Sunday the 12th, between eight and nine O'clock, he was closing the ornamental gate, (which is massive iron, and divided into three compartments) with his wife, his daughter, and her child, standing by his side. There was a chain which should have been hooked on to the wall to prevent the gate sliding out of the grooves but this must have been detached by some person unknown to him during the period of divine service.
He was shutting the gate in the usual way, when the centre compartment slipped out of the groove and fell upon his wife and daughter, both of whom were taken to the South Hospital where the deceased died next morning from the injuries which she had received.

The verdict of the inquest was that Mrs Price had been "Accidentally Killed".

Not only had the gates fallen off prior to killing the unfortunate Mrs Price, but even after her death Pooley's were slow to react.

"Resolved - That a note be sent to Mr. Pooley to remind him, and to express the extreme disappointment of the Committee that this has been neglected after the late lamented accident."

Minutes of Sailors’ Home Committee Meeting July 21, 1852

Despite the obvious mechanical problems causing of the fatal accident, The Home’s Committee thought that action should be taken against the individual responsible for the gate falling. It was not Mr. Pooley or his foreman that were brought to account but the unfortunate doorkeeper, Joseph Clark who was suspended and replaced by William Elliot at 18/- per week.

This might have been all that could be written about Cunningham and Pooley’s entrance gates until their removal after World War 2, but lightning was to strike twice.

=== 1907: The Tragic Death of Constable Locke ===
In the Annals of the Sailors' Home, printed in the Home's annual report for the year 1935, against the year 1907 was the following entry: November - Police Officer Locke killed through front gate falling upon him.

The following is taken from contemporary accounts: "Early on the morning of Sunday 24 November, nearly an hour after midnight, Police constable number 324A, Brownlow Locke, of the Liverpool City Constabulary, met his death in a very strange and unexpected manner."

"Constable Locke had gone on duty at 5.45 pm. on Saturday evening. A heavy downfall of hail occurred at the time when the porter of the Sailors' Home came out to close the outer gate, which was a solid and heavy iron structure, opened and shut by being wheeled across the opening. The constable, it appears, had left his waterproof cape at another part of his beat, and had stood inside the entrance of the Sailors' Home to shelter from the storm. Seeing the porter unable to pull the mid section of the gate into place, the officer went to his assistance but had evidently given so strong a pull that the gate had run sharply and snapped the hold back chains, one of which was tied with rope. The gate overshot the guide and toppled outwards from the top. The porter during the operation was inside and the policeman outside the gate. Seeing it begin to fall over, the porter made a grab at it, but was overpowered by the heavy mass, and sustained some injury in being carried with it, while the officer, being beneath, sustained the whole impetus of the downfall. Being a mass of metal weighing about half a tonne, the gate crushed the officer so severely that he was at once rendered unconscious."

"When removed on the ambulance to the Royal Southern Hospital it was found that the injuries, consisting of a fracture of the 'scull' and internal injuries, so serious as to preclude the hope of recovery. About 1.30 on Sunday morning Thomas Locke, who was also a constable in the City Force, was informed that his brother had been injured and taken to Hospital. He immediately proceeded to the institution. His brother, who was unconscious, expired a few minutes after he arrived. Locke, who originally came from Widnes, was described as a very promising officer of twenty six years of age, who had four years' service. He left a widow and one child. The victim of the calamity was the fourth member of his family in police service, two brothers serving in the Liverpool Constabulary and one in St. Helens."

"The heavy mass of iron which caused the officer's death lay prone alongside of the front of the building for some time and was an object of curious investigation by morbid passers-by who knew of the sad affair."

"Constable Locke was buried three days after the accident at Anfield Cemetery. The coffin was conveyed from his home in Rutland-street on one of the Fire Brigade's hose carriages, which was covered with wreaths. About 200 of the deceased's colleagues in uniform followed the cortege. Large numbers of people assembled all along the route. The neighbourhood of the deceased was crowded by sympathetic friends. The chief mourners were the widow and the mother of the deceased and his three brothers (Police-constables Robert, Alfred, and William Locke). Many police officials also attended included two Chief Superintendents. Among others present was Mr. Hanmer, the manager of the Sailors' Home. Wreaths were sent from the Liverpool Police Divisions and from the Sailors' Home." "At the inquest on the constable’s death, Mr. A. E. Frankland representing the Home, stated that 'he wished to take the opportunity on behalf of the management of the Sailors' Home of expressing their great regret at the accident and also their deep sympathy with the deceased's relatives'.

55 years after the death of Mrs Price the repairs performed by Mr. Pooley's foreman had failed and the gates had claimed a second victim." Despite fierce public declarations on December 5 the Committee met to consider the suggestion of Mr. Duder's (the prosecuting solicitor) that the Home should make an offer to the Policeman's widow. After discussing the matter and consulting with Mr. Pedder who advised there was no legal liability in the matter, it was decided that he should see Mr. Duder and repudiate liability but ascertain whether the widow would be prepared to accept an ex gratia payment as a mark of the Committee's sympathy - any such payment to be without prejudice in every way to the legal position of the Committee of the Home. The secretary was instructed to have the gate inspected by Killick and Cochran and to obtain from them an estimate for “making it secure against such an accident in future".

At the next meeting of the Committee on 23 December: "The Chairman reported that in regard to the Policeman's widow, the matter was still in process of settlement. The Chairman presented Messrs. Killick and Cochran's suggestion an estimate for placing a new wrought iron top guide rail for gates, the Secretary was instructed to request them to proceed with the work at once and to ascertain if they consider the ground runners in good order and also if the new chains supplied by them had been tested and to what extent. A certificate was obtained from the Mersey Chain Testing Works, dated January 21/08 giving the test applied to the chains of the front gate as proof strain applied 6 Cwt, Safe load 3 Cwt the secretary reported that Messrs. Killick & Cochran had told him the chains were amply strong for the purpose. At the same time the Chairman presented the report and balance sheet for 1907, which was passed subject to £ 100 being carried to a suspense to cover a grant for Policeman Locke's widow and costs." Other authorities also made provision for the Constable's widow, but they were not overgenerous. The Merseyside Police Pensions Index for 20 January 1908, records a gratuity of £25 4 shillings paid to Ellen Locke widow of Constable Locke aged 25.

Visitors to Anfield Cemetery will look in vain for any monument to Constable Locke, whose grave is unmarked despite the unusual nature of his passing and the pomp and ceremony of his burial.

Disturbed by the death of Constable Locke the Chairman approached the Homes' solicitors Messrs. Weightman, Pedder & Co. to determine their liability with regards to third parties having accidents whilst in the Home. The news was not good for the individual Committee members. They were personally liable for the consequences of the negligent action of their servants and liable for injuries happening in consequence of the defective condition of the premises. Fearing the financial penalties in the event of other accidents the Committee quickly resolved that a policy be taken out for £1000 for anyone accident and a maximum of £2000 in one year. Records do not show if a claim was ever made against this policy.

=== 1951: The Gates Move to Their New Home in Sandwell ===
As part of the repair to War Damage following the Liverpool Blitz it was decided to remove the gates. On 25 March 1948 W & T Avery who had swallowed-up Pooley's and Sons were offered the gates by the Sailors' Home Committee. On 18 May 1949 Avery's made an offer of 50 guineas for the gates, which was accepted on 3 May. 1951.

On 11 June 1951 it was reported that the gates were 'quite improperly' holding up the archway above them, and considerable work would be necessary before they dare be removed by the Sailors' Home Contractors. Despite this report the gate had been in place for nearly one hundred years and had supported the entrance arch, just as John Cunningham and Henry Pooley Jnr. had intended when they set down their plans in April 1853.

On 1 December. 1951 the gates were finally loaded on to a lorry for transport to the Avery Historical Museum in Soho, Birmingham. These magnificent gates were altered to swing open like conventional doors rather than slide apart as originally intended; the chains which would have prevented them sliding too far were however still present.

Photographs of the gates in Birmingham show the mermaids on the four iron panels had suffered fin loss and other signs of damage, which older photographs from 1941, show occurred before the move. This may be malicious damage caused by seamen angry at being locked out of the Home after curfew, or during the three occasions, two of them deadly, when the chains failed to stop the massive doors coming off the rails.

== Demolition of the Sailors' Home ==
The home was demolished between 1974 and 1975, and the site then remained unused for over 30 years, until the construction of Liverpool One.

== Sailors' Home gates return to Liverpool ==
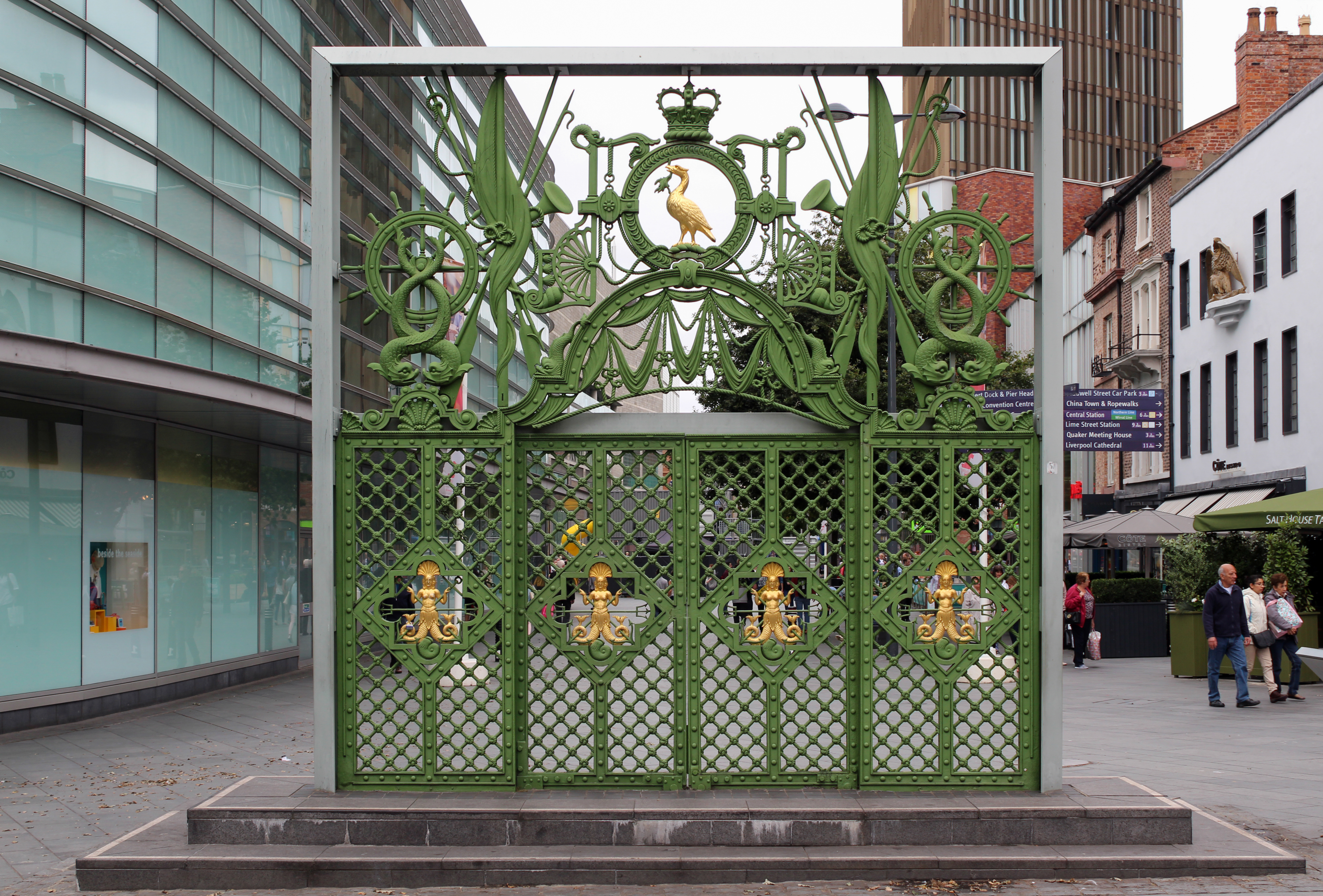
Gates at Liverpool One

In the summer of 2010, following Sandwell MBC’s concerns about the condition of the gates and corrosion of their supporting structure, the structure was dismantled and taken to Barr & Grosvenor Ltd’s foundry in Wolverhampton for restoration under the guidance of the company’s head, Dominic Grosvenor. The £32K estimated cost of the restoration was borne by Avery. The gates could have either been returned to Avery’s historic Soho Foundry site or to the St Thomas's Church memorial garden, close to the replica of the 1850s Liverbird carving which stood above the building's entrance.

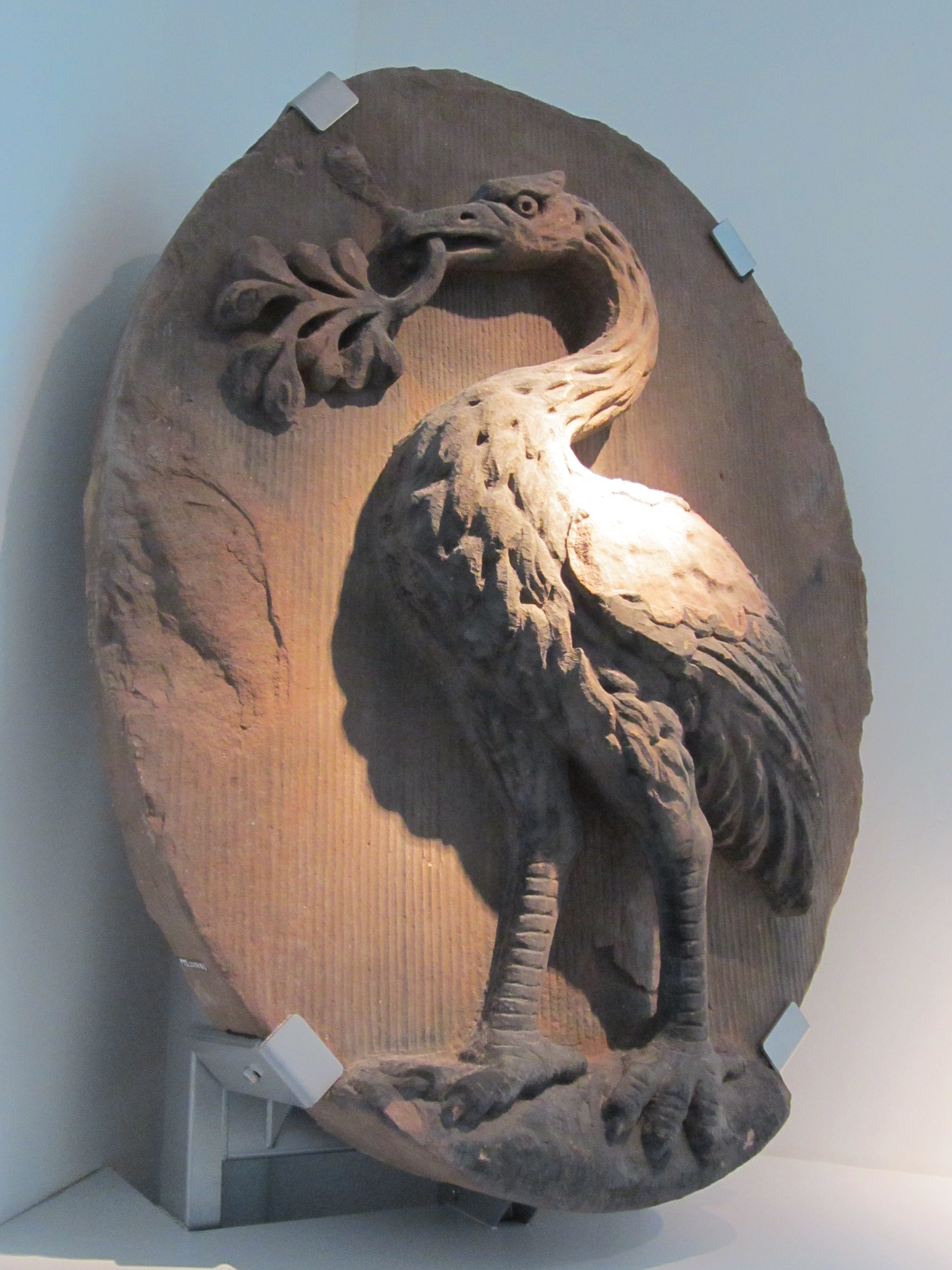
Liver bird from the Sailors' Home, Liverpool (2)

In March 2011 Officers at Sandwell Council approved an application to have the Sailors' Home Gates relocated to Liverpool as they felt the gates would have more significance to the community in their home city than in Sandwell.

After restoration the gates were returned to Liverpool on 8 August 2011 and were re-erected under the name "The Sailors Home Gateway" in the pedestrian section of Paradise Street in Liverpool One, close to the original site of the Sailors' Home.
