= County Buildings, Duns =

Courthouse in Duns, Scotland

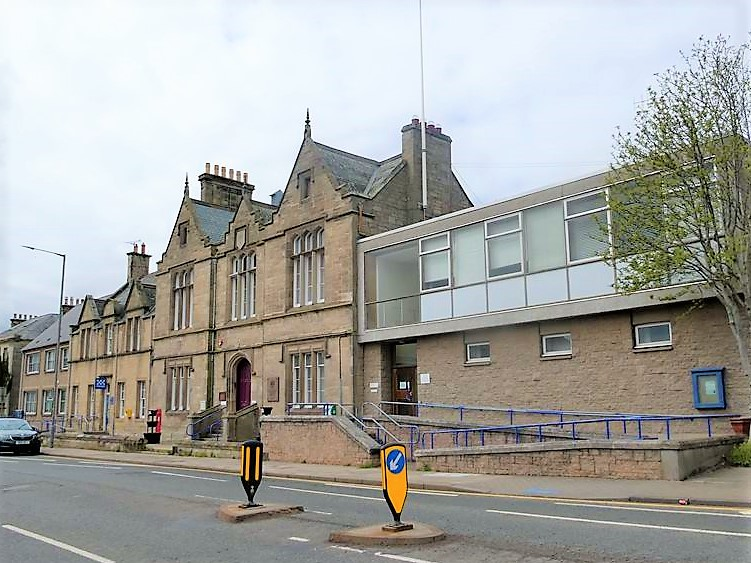
- County Buildings, Duns

- Shown in Scottish Borders
- 55.7787°N 2.3455°W
- Location: Newtown Street, Duns

History
- Built: 1856

Site notes
- Architectural style: Jacobean style

Listed Building – Category C(S)
- Official name: Former Duns Sheriff Court excluding flat-roofed extension adjoining to east, 8 Newtown Street, Duns
- Designated: 22 December 1994
- Reference no.: LB26556

County Buildings is a municipal structure in Newtown Street, Duns, Scottish Borders, Scotland. The complex, which was the headquarters of Berwickshire County Council and was also used as a courthouse, is a Category C listed building.

== History ==
After the town of Berwick had finally been ceded to English control in 1482, the functions of the county town (principally holding the sheriff court) were initially shared between Duns and Lauder, until 1596 when Greenlaw was declared the county town by James VI. In 1661 the county town was moved to Duns, but in 1696 it was moved back to Greenlaw. The rivalry between the two towns resurfaced in the nineteenth century. Duns had grown to be one of the larger towns in the county, whereas Greenlaw remained little more than a village. A courthouse was erected in Greenlaw in 1712 and replaced by County Hall in Greenlaw in 1831. However, in 1853 an Act of Parliament was passed allowing the courts and commissioners' meetings to be held at Duns as well as at Greenlaw.

The foundation stone for a new courthouse at Newtown Street in Duns was laid on 22 July 1856, with the building being called "County Buildings". The design involved a symmetrical main frontage of three bays facing onto Newtown Street. The centre bay featured an arched entrance with a hood mould on the ground floor and a tri-partite mullioned window on the first floor surmounted by a blind shield and a Dutch gable with a finial. The outer bays, which were slightly projected forward, were fenestrated by tri-partite windows on both floors and were also surmounted by Dutch gables with finials.

Elected county councils were established in 1890 under the Local Government (Scotland) Act 1889, taking over most of the functions of the commissioners. Berwickshire County Council held its first meeting on 22 May 1890 at County Hall in Greenlaw, when it decided by 18 votes to 12 that all subsequent meetings should be held at Duns. Greenlaw was still considered the official county town after 1890, despite the county council meeting in Duns and courts being held at both towns. An Act of Parliament in 1903 finally revoked Greenlaw's status as county town and declared Duns to be the county town for all purposes. The county council therefore based itself at the County Buildings in Duns, sharing the premises with its continuing use as a sheriff court. The county council subsequently established additional offices in various converted houses along Newtown Street.

During the Second World War, the area accommodated elements of the Polish I Corps and, on 3 May 1943, a plaque was installed on the front of the building to commemorate their presence. A modern extension was added to County Buildings in 1967.

After the abolition of Berwickshire County Council in 1975, the building became the headquarters of the lower-tier Berwickshire District Council until that authority in turn was abolished in 1996. The building continued to serve a judicial function, being used for hearings of the sheriff's court and, on one day a month, for hearings of the justice of the peace court, until it closed as a court in 2015. The building remained in use as a secondary office of Scottish Borders Council, until services were relocated to Duns Library from April 2026.

== See also ==
- List of listed buildings in Duns, Scottish Borders
