= John Cunningham (architect) =

Scottish architect

- Born: 1799; Leitholm, Berwickshire, Scotland
- Died: 2 October 1873 (aged 73–74); Trinity, Edinburgh, Scotland
- Occupation: Architect
- Spouse: Agnes Usher
- Children: John Usher Cunningham
- Buildings: Crewe railway station, Liverpool Lime Street railway station, Liverpool Sailors' Home, Philharmonic Hall, Liverpool

John Cunningham (1799 – 2 October 1873) was a Scottish architect. He designed Lime Street railway station and the original Philharmonic Hall in Liverpool.

== Life ==
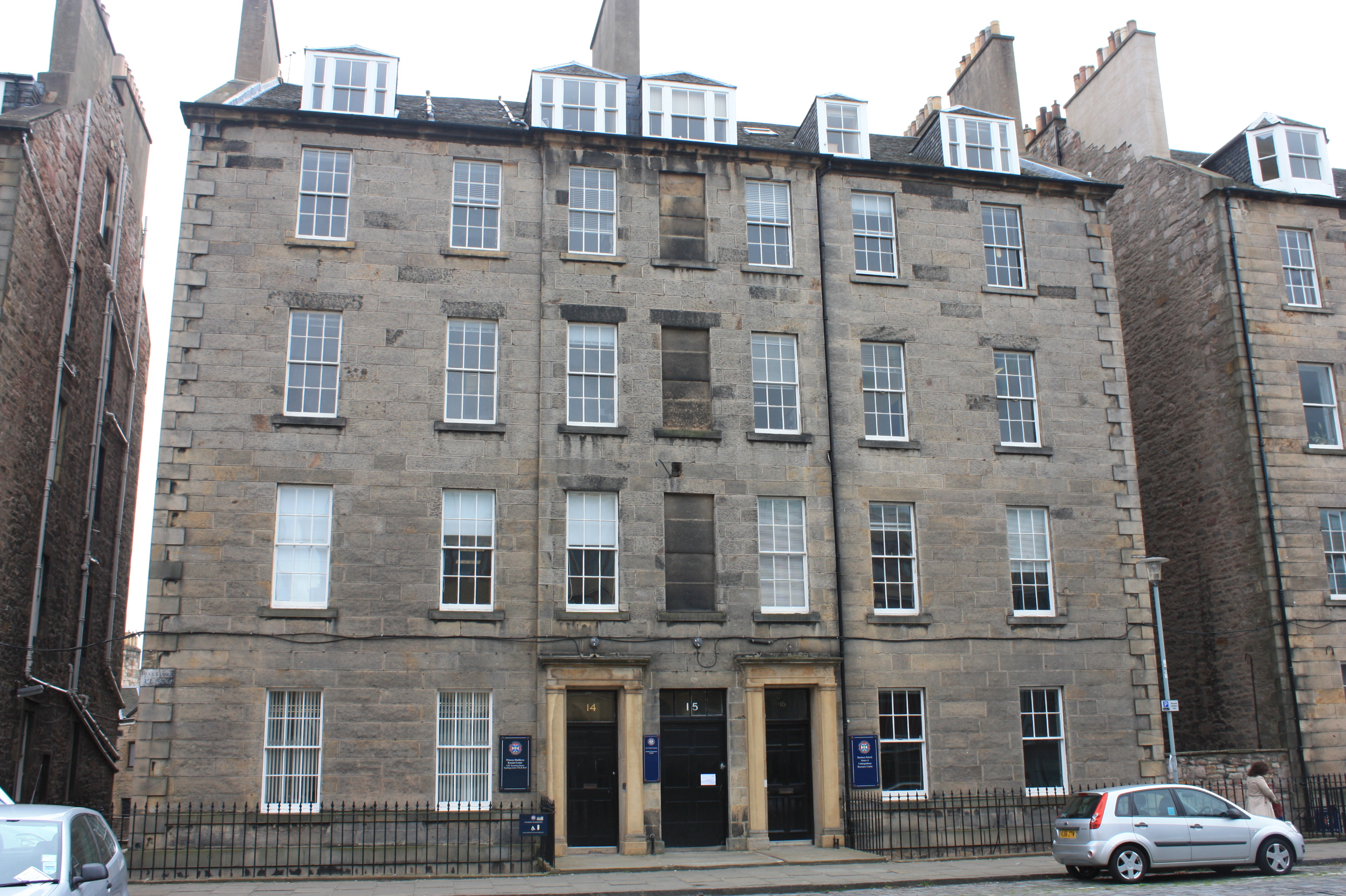
Cunningham lived in a flat at 15 Buccleuch Place, Edinburgh

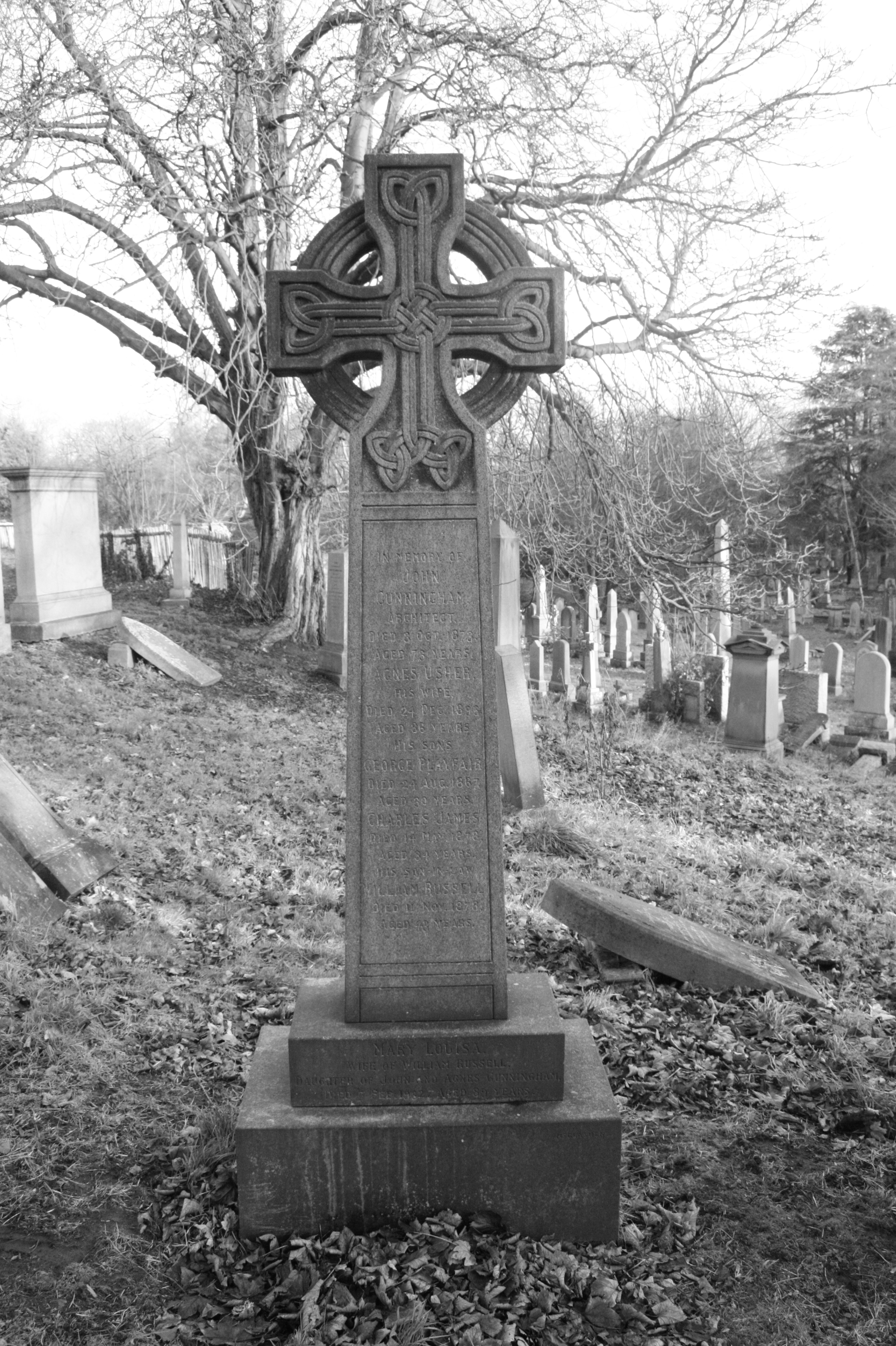
The grave of John Cunningham, Warriston Cemetery, Edinburgh

Born in 1799 in the Scottish village of Leitholm, Berwickshire, he was the son of a builder to whom he was initially apprenticed. His talent came to the attention of Sir William Purves-Hume-Campbell, 6th Baronet. He designed his first building aged 17, a lodge for the Marchmont Estate.

In 1819, Cunningham was apprenticed to Thomas Brown, Edinburgh's Superintendent of Works, and remained in that city for 10 years. In 1829 he designed Greenlaw Town Hall in the Greek Revival style, using money supplied by Sir William Purves-Hume-Campbell, 6th Baronet. In 1832/3 he is noted as living at 15 Buccleuch Place, a flat in the south side of Edinburgh.

In 1833, he married Agnes Usher. That same year, his patron, Purves-Hume-Campbell, 6th Baronet, died, and Cunningham and his wife moved to New York, possibly to find work. However, the climate there had a detrimental effect on his health, and he returned to Edinburgh in 1834. On his return he was commissioned to design the Castle Inn Hotel in Greenlaw, which was situated directly across from Greenlaw Town Hall.

Later that year, he was invited to Liverpool by Samuel Holme, a politician and builder. In Liverpool Cunningham formed an informal partnership with Holme's brother Arthur Hill Holme, which lasted until 1840. During that time the two men collaborated to design the Liverpool Lime Street railway station.

Cunningham was elected as a fellow of the Geological Society of London on 6 February 1839. He had a lifelong interest in geology and fossils, traveling to see the fossil tracks at Storeton as well as being a regular contributor to the Quarterly Journal of the Geological Society.

In 1842, Cunningham took a trip through Belgium and France with Samuel Holme. During the trip he contracted cholera, but managed to recuperate.

A building of his design, the Jacobethan Sailors' Home, opened in Liverpool in 1850.

In 1860 he formed a partnership with the brothers George Ashdown Audsley and William Audsley of W. & G. Audsley. The partnership was terminated when the brothers opted to become independent in 1863.

Cunningham retired and left Liverpool in the summer of 1873, returning to Edinburgh and settling in the Trinity district, in order to live closer to his family and friends. There, he began a design for the St Andrews Public Halls, assisted by Campbell Douglas and James Sellars. However, before the building could be completed, he died at Laverockbank Terrace in Trinity on 2 October 1873 at the age of 73. His obituary ran in The Builder on 18 October.

He is buried in Warriston Cemetery close to his final home. The grave lies on the main west path on its east side at the transition between the upper and lower sections.

His last project was finished posthumously by Campbell Douglas and James Sellars in 1875.

== Family ==
In 1833 he married Agnes Usher (d.1896).

His son, John Usher Cunningham, was born on 16 February 1839. Other sons included George Playfair Cunningham (1837-1867) and William Russell Cunningham (1835-1878).

== Works ==
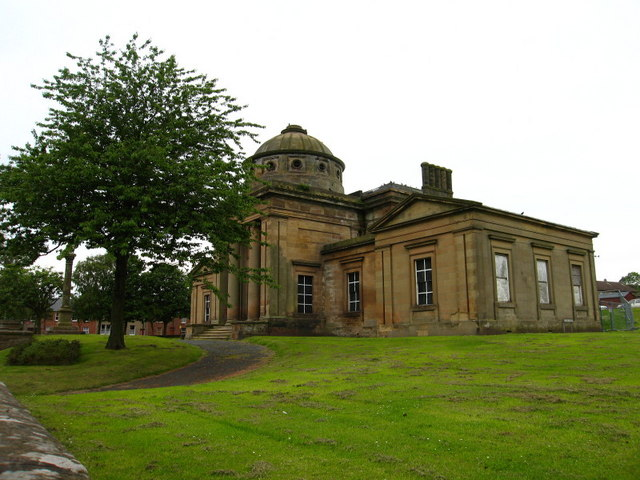
The Greenlaw County Hall

A number of the buildings he designed in Liverpool have since been demolished, but many in Scotland still stand. Some of his works include:

- Marchmont House (1816)
- Greenlaw Town Hall (1829) – featured in the 2006 BBC television series Restoration
- Arrowe Hall (1835)
- Liverpool Lime Street railway station (1836)
- Court Hey Hall (1836)
- Crewe railway station (1837)
- Christ Church (1843)
- Philharmonic Hall (1844) According to his obituary, Cunningham was exceedingly proud of this building, reportedly saying: "Well the fact is that for a concert-hall, it is joost perfect!"
- Liverpool Sailors' Home (1846)
- Backford Hall (1863)
- St Andrews Public Halls (1875)
