= George Gibson (mathematician) =

Scottish mathematician and academic author

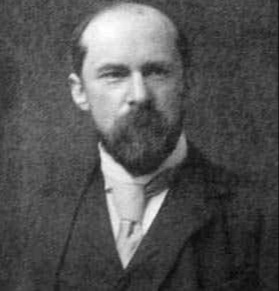
George Alexander Gibson

George Alexander Gibson FRSE LLD (19 April 1858 – 1 April 1930) was a Scottish mathematician and academic writer.

== Life ==
He was born on 19 April 1858 in Greenlaw in Berwickshire the third son of Robert Gibson JP (1830–1903). He attended the free church school in the parish, and showing great promise, went to the University of Glasgow where he graduated with an MA in 1882 and immediately joined the university staff.

In 1889, aged 29, he was elected a fellow of the Royal Society of Edinburgh. His proposers were William Thomson, Lord Kelvin, Prof William Jack, Sir Thomas Muir and George Chrystal. He served as the society's vice president from 1917 to 1920. He also served as president of the Edinburgh Mathematical Society. In 1895 he became a professor of mathematics at the Glasgow and West of Scotland Technical College. In 1909 he returned to the University of Glasgow as a professor, replacing his mentor Prof William Jack.

Gibson lived on campus at 10 The university, Glasgow. The University of Edinburgh awarded him an honorary doctorate (LLD) in 1905 and the University of Glasgow did likewise in 1927, the year of his retiral.

== Death ==
He died at Scotstounhill in Glasgow on 1 April 1930. On his death the Gibson Memorial Lecture was founded. The first lecturer in this series was Albert Einstein. Other lecturers include Charles Coulson and Edward Collingwood.

== Family ==
In 1890, he married Nellie Stenhouse Hunter, daughter of James D. Hunter, while still a student. They had three children.

== Publications ==
- Gibson, George A (1901). An Elementary Treatise on the Calculus with illustrations from geometry, mechanics and physics. London: Macmillan.
- Gibson, George A (1904). An introduction to the calculus, based on graphical methods. London: Macmillan.
- Gibson, George A (1905). An Elementary Treatise on Graphs. London: Macmillan.
- Gibson, George A (1927). "Sketch of the History of Mathematics in Scotland to the end of the 18th Century: Part I". Proceedings of the Edinburgh Mathematical Society. 1 (1): 1–18. doi:10.1017/S0013091500007276.
- Gibson, George A (1928). "Sketch of the History of Mathematics in Scotland to the end of the 18th Century: Part II". Proceedings of the Edinburgh Mathematical Society. 1 (2): 71–93. doi:10.1017/S0013091500007409.
