= List of listed buildings in Duns, Scottish Borders =

This is a list of listed buildings in the parish of Duns in the Scottish Borders, Scotland.

== List ==
Name	Location	Date Listed	Grid Ref. (Note: Sometimes known as OSGB36, the grid reference (where provided) is based on the British national grid reference system used by the Ordnance Survey. • "Guide to National Grid". Ordnance Survey. • "Get-a-map". Ordnance Survey.)	Geo-coordinates	Notes	LB Number (Note: Historic Environment Scotland assign a unique alphanumeric identifier to each designated site in Scotland, for listed buildings this always begins with "LB", for example "LB12345".)	Image
Manderston, Buxley, Dairyman's House And Archway				55°47′09″N 2°18′19″W	Category B	42509	Upload Photo
Manderston, Lake Wood, Chinese Bridge				55°46′49″N 2°18′11″W	Category B	42523	Upload Photo
Manderston Mains				55°47′24″N 2°18′06″W	Category C(S)	42524	Upload Photo
Putton Mill, Cottages, Steading And Former Mill				55°45′38″N 2°19′37″W	Category B	42541	Upload Photo
Brieryhill, Cottages				55°46′49″N 2°17′36″W	Category B	42477	Upload Photo
Brieryhill, House, Kennels, Steading And Stalk				55°46′48″N 2°17′37″W	Category B	42478	Upload Photo
Cockburn Mill And Outbuildings				55°48′55″N 2°21′33″W	Category B	42485	Upload Photo
Duns Castle Estate, Stable Block				55°46′58″N 2°21′23″W	Category B	42497	Upload Photo
6 Church Square Parish Church Halls				55°46′40″N 2°20′32″W	Category B	26486	Upload Photo
1 Clouds With Former Gig House And Stable, And Boundary Wall				55°46′45″N 2°20′47″W	Category B	26487	Upload Photo
12 And 12A Currie Street With Gatepiers, Former Stable, And Hayloft				55°46′39″N 2°20′27″W	Category B	26498	Upload Photo
14 Langtongate				55°46′37″N 2°20′51″W	Category C(S)	26512	Upload Photo
36 And 37 Market Square (Northern Rock Building Society And Fpc&G Solicitors)				55°46′39″N 2°20′40″W	Category B	26530	Upload Photo
50 And 51 Market Square				55°46′39″N 2°20′38″W	Category B	26537	Upload Photo
56, 56A, B And C And 57 Market Square				55°46′39″N 2°20′37″W	Category C(S)	26538	Upload Photo
9 Murray Street With Wall				55°46′39″N 2°20′34″W	Category C(S)	26540	Upload Photo
14 And 16 Murray Street, Marchcroft And Adjoining House With Boundary Walls And Gatepiers				55°46′37″N 2°20′35″W	Category B	26546	Upload Photo
29 Newtown Street With Attached Barn And Stables To Rear, With Sundial				55°46′41″N 2°20′47″W	Category B	26550	Upload Photo
14 Newtown Street, County Offices With Gatepiers And Railings				55°46′43″N 2°20′47″W	Category B	26558	Upload Photo
30 Newtown Street				55°46′41″N 2°20′52″W	Category C(S)	26566	Upload Photo
Preston Road Cemetery				55°47′01″N 2°20′08″W	Category C(S)	26573	Upload Photo
Preston Road, Christ Church (Episcopal) With Steps, Boundary Wall, Gates, Lamp Standard And Burial Ground				55°46′52″N 2°20′34″W	Category B	26574	Upload Photo
1-7 (Odd Nos) South Street				55°46′39″N 2°20′39″W	Category B	26579	Upload Photo
Station Road, Blyth Bank With Boundary Wall, Gatepiers And Gates				55°46′33″N 2°20′25″W	Category B	26589	Upload Photo
Station Road, The Hermitage With Garage, Boundary Wall, Gatepiers And Gates				55°46′27″N 2°20′29″W	Category B	26590	Upload Photo
Station Road, The Wellnage With Boundary Wall, Gatepiers And Gates				55°46′31″N 2°20′23″W	Category B	26596	Upload Photo
15 Tiendhillgreen With Conservatory, Boundary Wall And Gateway				55°46′51″N 2°20′37″W	Category B	26603	Upload Photo
Bridgend, Lanark Lodge With Stable Buildings				55°46′32″N 2°20′08″W	Category B	26455	Upload Photo
10 Bridgend				55°46′36″N 2°20′20″W	Category C(S)	26460	Upload Photo
22 Bridgend With Boundary Wall And Gatepiers				55°46′35″N 2°20′15″W	Category C(S)	26461	Upload Photo
Castle Street, Manse Gates And Barn				55°46′45″N 2°20′42″W	Category C(S)	26464	Upload Photo
19-23 (Inclusive Nos) Castle Street				55°46′43″N 2°20′41″W	Category C(S)	26467	Upload Photo
28 And 28B Castle Street				55°46′43″N 2°20′39″W	Category C(S)	26481	Upload Photo
Grueldykes With Cottage, Garage, Boundary Walls And Gatepiers				55°46′07″N 2°21′09″W	Category B	4028	Upload Photo
Manderston Buxley, Bullock Court And Implement Shed				55°47′10″N 2°18′19″W	Category B	4035	Upload Photo
Manderston, North Entrance Gatepiers, Railings And Stalk				55°47′08″N 2°18′27″W	Category B	42526	Upload Photo
Manderston Mill, House				55°47′47″N 2°18′31″W	Category C(S)	42527	Upload Photo
Manderston, Pinkie Cottages And Pinkie Smithy				55°46′34″N 2°18′31″W	Category C(S)	42530	Upload Photo
Manderston, Sunken Terraces With Pavilion And Dovecot				55°46′58″N 2°18′08″W	Category B	42533	Upload Photo
Playfield				55°47′28″N 2°19′41″W	Category C(S)	42539	Upload Photo
Chalkielaw Farmhouse, Steading And Stalk				55°46′48″N 2°18′55″W	Category B	42482	Upload Photo
Duns Castle Estate, Gardener's Cottage				55°46′50″N 2°21′48″W	Category C(S)	42492	Upload Photo
4 And 5 Golden Square				55°46′39″N 2°20′42″W	Category C(S)	26504	Upload Photo
6, 6A And 7 Golden Square				55°46′40″N 2°20′42″W	Category C(S)	26505	Upload Photo
7 Langtongate				55°46′37″N 2°20′50″W	Category C(S)	26507	Upload Photo
11 And 12 Market Square, The Royal Bank Of Scotland				55°46′41″N 2°20′36″W	Category B	26521	Upload Photo
40 And 41 Market Square				55°46′40″N 2°20′39″W	Category C(S)	26532	Upload Photo
11 And 13 Newtown Street, Boston House				55°46′42″N 2°20′43″W	Category C(S)	26548	Upload Photo
Newtown Street, Sheriff Court, With Boundary Wall				55°46′43″N 2°20′44″W	Category B	26556	Upload another image
22 Newtown Street				55°46′42″N 2°20′49″W	Category C(S)	26562	Upload Photo
24 Newtown Street, County Council Offices, And Carriage Arch				55°46′41″N 2°20′50″W	Category C(S)	26563	Upload Photo
34-38 (Even Nos) Newtown Street				55°46′40″N 2°20′53″W	Category C(S)	26568	Upload Photo
47 South Street				55°46′37″N 2°20′48″W	Category C(S)	26585	Upload Photo
Bridgend, Haymount With Boundary Wall, Gates, Gatepier And Stables				55°46′35″N 2°20′23″W	Category B	26454	Upload Photo
15 And 17 Castle Street				55°46′43″N 2°20′41″W	Category C(S)	26466	Upload Photo
45 Castle Street				55°46′47″N 2°20′45″W	Category C(S)	26476	Upload Photo
18 Castle Street				55°46′42″N 2°20′39″W	Category B	26480	Upload Photo
Duns Castle, With Screen Walls And Sundial				55°46′55″N 2°21′21″W	Category A	4108	Upload Photo
Duns Castle, South Lodge, Boundary Walls Gates And Gateway				55°46′30″N 2°21′16″W	Category B	4110	Upload Photo
Cumledge With Suspension Bridge, Gatepiers And Auxiliary Buildings, Including U-Plan Court And Cottages				55°48′02″N 2°20′07″W	Category B	4112	Upload Photo
Wedderburn Castle, Stable Block				55°46′10″N 2°18′38″W	Category B	4030	Upload Photo
Manderston, Pheasantry Wood, Kennels				55°46′59″N 2°17′43″W	Category B	4037	Upload Photo
Manderston, Buxley Cottages				55°47′10″N 2°18′22″W	Category B	42507	Upload Photo
Manderston, Eastern Dam				55°46′55″N 2°18′03″W	Category B	42521	Upload Photo
Manderston, South Lodge With Gates, Gatepiers And Railings				55°46′44″N 2°17′53″W	Category B	42531	Upload Photo
Manderston, Woodland Garden, Seat				55°46′53″N 2°18′02″W	Category B	42536	Upload Photo
Ninewar House, With Steading And Horsemill				55°47′39″N 2°19′05″W	Category B	42537	Upload Photo
Windshiel Steading And Farmhouse				55°49′15″N 2°24′33″W	Category B	42548	Upload Photo
Cheeklaw House				55°46′04″N 2°20′16″W	Category C(S)	42484	Upload Photo
Crumstane Lye				55°46′31″N 2°18′19″W	Category C(S)	42488	Upload Photo
Duns Castle Estate, North Lodge And Entrance Arch				55°46′52″N 2°20′49″W	Category B	42494	Upload Photo
Edenbank				55°47′23″N 2°20′04″W	Category C(S)	42499	Upload Photo
9 Clouds, Woodside With Gateway, Forecourt Walls And Garage				55°46′45″N 2°20′50″W	Category C(S)	26490	Upload Photo
10 Currie Street				55°46′39″N 2°20′28″W	Category C(S)	26496	Upload Photo
36 Easter Street And Veterinary Surgery With Boundary Wall				55°46′43″N 2°20′30″W	Category C(S)	26503	Upload Photo
Langtongate, Sunnyside With Boundary Wall, Gatepiers And Gates				55°46′31″N 2°21′08″W	Category B	26506	Upload Photo
13 Langtongate, Langton Cottage, With Gatepiers, Boundary Wall And Railings				55°46′35″N 2°20′58″W	Category C(S)	26509	Upload Photo
6 Market Square				55°46′40″N 2°20′34″W	Category C(S)	26518	Upload Photo
17 Market Square				55°46′42″N 2°20′38″W	Category C(S)	26524	Upload Photo
38, 39, 44 And 45 Market Square (Wightmans)				55°46′40″N 2°20′39″W	Category B	26531	Upload Photo
19 Newtown Street, The Hunt				55°46′42″N 2°20′45″W	Category C(S)	26549	Upload Photo
40 Newtown Street With Garden Wall				55°46′40″N 2°20′54″W	Category B	26569	Upload Photo
Preston Road Wellfield Cottage, With Boundary Wall				55°46′53″N 2°20′23″W	Category C(S)	26577	Upload Photo
Post Office, 37 South Street				55°46′37″N 2°20′45″W	Category C(S)	26583	Upload Photo
4 And 6 South Street And 2 And 3 Golden Square				55°46′39″N 2°20′41″W	Category C(S)	26586	Upload Photo
28 And 30 South Street And 21 North Street				55°46′38″N 2°20′45″W	Category C(S)	26588	Upload Photo
Station Road, Norham Lodge With Boundary Wall, Gatepiers And Gates				55°46′23″N 2°20′27″W	Category B	26593	Upload Photo
11 And 13 Black Bull Street				55°46′40″N 2°20′43″W	Category C(S)	26452	Upload Photo
41 Castle Street				55°46′47″N 2°20′45″W	Category B	26474	Upload Photo
47 And 49 Castle Street				55°46′47″N 2°20′45″W	Category C(S)	26477	Upload Photo
Duns Castle Estate, Pavilion Lodge				55°46′55″N 2°21′05″W	Category B	4111	Upload Photo
Cairnbank With Stable, Coach House And Gatepiers				55°46′33″N 2°19′42″W	Category B	4027	Upload Photo
Manderston, Buxley, Dairy Court				55°47′09″N 2°18′19″W	Category A	42508	Upload Photo
Manderston, Buxley, Engineer's House With Gatepiers And Garden Walls				55°47′11″N 2°18′22″W	Category A	42511	Upload Photo
Manderston, Buxley, Head Gardener's House, Fountain				55°47′09″N 2°18′21″W	Category B	42517	Upload Photo
Manderston Mill Cottages				55°47′49″N 2°18′36″W	Category C(S)	42525	Upload Photo
Manderston, Terraces To South And East, Including Ram's Horn Stair, Urns, Mercury Statue And Griffin Gate				55°46′56″N 2°18′10″W	Category A	42534	Upload Photo
Brieryhill, Bridge				55°46′50″N 2°17′38″W	Category C(S)	42476	Upload Photo
Crumstane Farmhouse				55°46′28″N 2°18′29″W	Category C(S)	42487	Upload Photo
The Geans				55°46′29″N 2°21′33″W	Category C(S)	42500	Upload Photo
4 Clouds (Incorporating No 2 Clouds) With Boundary Wall				55°46′46″N 2°20′45″W	Category C(S)	26489	Upload Photo
Currie Street, Former South Church With Boundary Wall, Gatepiers And Former Hall				55°46′41″N 2°20′31″W	Category C(S)	26493	Upload Photo
8 Currie Street				55°46′40″N 2°20′29″W	Category C(S)	26494	Upload Photo
Easter Street, Wellfield House Lodge, With Gatepiers And Boundary Wall				55°46′48″N 2°20′24″W	Category C(S)	26499	Upload Photo
24 Langtongate				55°46′36″N 2°20′56″W	Category C(S)	26514	Upload Photo
Mercat Cross, Market Square				55°46′40″N 2°20′37″W	Category B	26516	Upload another image See more images
15 Market Square, The Whip And Saddle				55°46′41″N 2°20′37″W	Category B	26522	Upload Photo
16 Market Square				55°46′41″N 2°20′37″W	Category B	26523	Upload Photo
29 And 30 Market Square				55°46′41″N 2°20′40″W	Category C(S)	26528	Upload Photo
31-34 (Inclusive Nos) Market Square, The White Swan Hotel				55°46′41″N 2°20′41″W	Category B	26529	Upload another image
33 Newtown Street				55°46′41″N 2°20′48″W	Category C(S)	26551	Upload Photo
43 Newtown Street				55°46′40″N 2°20′50″W	Category B	26554	Upload Photo
28 Newtown Street With Attached Outbuildings To Rear				55°46′41″N 2°20′51″W	Category B	26565	Upload Photo
2 North Street				55°46′40″N 2°20′42″W	Category C(S)	26572	Upload Photo
6 Tiendhillgreen With Boundary Walls And Gatepiers				55°46′49″N 2°20′42″W	Category C(S)	26601	Upload Photo
Willis Wynd Former Chapel				55°46′39″N 2°20′50″W	Category C(S)	26605	Upload Photo
15 Black Bull Street, The Black Bull Hotel				55°46′41″N 2°20′44″W	Category C(S)	26453	Upload Photo
29 Castle Street				55°46′45″N 2°20′43″W	Category B	26468	Upload Photo
Manderston, Buxley, Estate Office				55°47′11″N 2°18′22″W	Category B	42512	Upload Photo
Manderston, Buxley, Head Gardener's House With Outbuildings, Boundary Walls And Gateways				55°47′10″N 2°18′21″W	Category A	42516	Upload Photo
Manderston, Buxley, Head Gardener's House, Sundial				55°47′09″N 2°18′21″W	Category B	42518	Upload Photo
Crumstane Cottages				55°46′34″N 2°18′33″W	Category C(S)	42486	Upload Photo
Langtongate, Berwickshire High School				55°46′31″N 2°21′24″W	Category B	42503	Upload Photo
47 Easter Street, Kirklands, With Boundary Wall And Gatepiers				55°46′45″N 2°20′30″W	Category B	26500	Upload Photo
59 Easter Street, Mansefield With Boundary Wall And Gatepiers				55°46′48″N 2°20′26″W	Category B	26501	Upload Photo
4 Langtongate				55°46′37″N 2°20′49″W	Category C(S)	26511	Upload Photo
28 Langtongate With Barn And Boundary Wall				55°46′37″N 2°20′57″W	Category C(S)	26515	Upload Photo
28 Market Square				55°46′41″N 2°20′40″W	Category B	26527	Upload Photo
47 Market Square				55°46′39″N 2°20′39″W	Category B	26535	Upload Photo
Maryfield, Murray Street With Boundary Wall, Gatepiers And Railings				55°46′35″N 2°20′32″W	Category B	26539	Upload Photo
6 Murray Street With Barn				55°46′39″N 2°20′36″W	Category C(S)	26543	Upload Photo
39 Newtown Street				55°46′40″N 2°20′49″W	Category C(S)	26553	Upload Photo
Newtown Street, Police Station				55°46′43″N 2°20′45″W	Category C(S)	26555	Upload Photo
2 Newtown Street, Horn Inn				55°46′44″N 2°20′43″W	Category C(S)	26557	Upload Photo
Public Park, War Memorial				55°46′32″N 2°20′30″W	Category C(S)	26578	Upload Photo
17 And 19 South Street				55°46′38″N 2°20′41″W	Category C(S)	26581	Upload Photo
35 South Street With Boundary Wall				55°46′37″N 2°20′44″W	Category B	26582	Upload Photo
Station Road, Station Yard, Granary				55°46′17″N 2°20′22″W	Category B	26598	Upload Photo
Todlaw Road Parkside, With Former Gig House, Boundary Wall And Gates				55°46′26″N 2°20′32″W	Category B	26604	Upload Photo
Bridgend, Trinity Lodge With Offices And Gatepiers				55°46′27″N 2°20′14″W	Category C(S)	26457	Upload Photo
42 Bridgend, Fenton Lodge, With Gatepiers And Railings				55°46′35″N 2°20′05″W	Category C(S)	26463	Upload Photo
13 Castle Street, Ogwen				55°46′43″N 2°20′40″W	Category B	26465	Upload Photo
35 Castle Street				55°46′46″N 2°20′44″W	Category C(S)	26471	Upload Photo
43 Castle Street				55°46′47″N 2°20′45″W	Category B	26475	Upload Photo
62 Castle Street				55°46′47″N 2°20′44″W	Category B	26483	Upload Photo
76 Castle Street, Watertank				55°46′50″N 2°20′43″W	Category B	26484	Upload Photo
Manderston, West Lodge And Gates, Gatepiers And Railings				55°46′54″N 2°18′43″W	Category B	4036	Upload Photo
Manderston, Buxley, Gates And Gatepiers Leading To Formal Garden				55°47′08″N 2°18′20″W	Category B	42515	Upload Photo
Manderston, Cricket Pavilion				55°47′02″N 2°18′10″W	Category C(S)	42520	Upload Photo
Oatleycleugh				55°49′15″N 2°23′53″W	Category C(S)	42538	Upload Photo
Whitchester, Whitchester Lodge And West Gate				55°49′30″N 2°25′28″W	Category B	42547	Upload Photo
Cammo House				55°46′20″N 2°21′42″W	Category C(S)	42480	Upload Photo
Manderston, Boat House And Gateway				55°46′51″N 2°18′12″W	Category A	42505	Upload Photo
13 (Dingleside) And 14 (The Elms) Clouds, With Gatepiers, Boundary Wall, Railings And Outbuildings				55°46′44″N 2°20′52″W	Category C(S)	26492	Upload Photo
9 Currie Street (National Farmers Union)				55°46′39″N 2°20′28″W	Category B	26495	Upload Photo
18 Easter Street And Currie Street With Garages, Outbuildings And Boundary Wall				55°46′42″N 2°20′32″W	Category C(S)	26502	Upload Photo
2 Langtongate				55°46′37″N 2°20′49″W	Category C(S)	26510	Upload Photo
16 And 18 Langtongate With Boundary Wall, Gatepiers And Railings				55°46′37″N 2°20′52″W	Category B	26513	Upload Photo
5 Market Square And 2 Church Square				55°46′40″N 2°20′34″W	Category B	26517	Upload Photo
25 And 26 Market Square, Incorporating The Working Men's Institute				55°46′41″N 2°20′39″W	Category B	26526	Upload Photo
42 And 43 Market Square, Tolbooth House				55°46′40″N 2°20′39″W	Category B	26533	Upload Photo
46 Market Square And 2 South Street, Former Dunlop Trust Hotel				55°46′39″N 2°20′40″W	Category B	26534	Upload Photo
11 And 13 Murray Street				55°46′39″N 2°20′33″W	Category C(S)	26541	Upload Photo
18 Newtown Street				55°46′42″N 2°20′47″W	Category C(S)	26560	Upload Photo
44 Newtown Street With Coach House, Out House, Boundary Walls, Gatepiers And Railings				55°46′40″N 2°20′55″W	Category B	26570	Upload Photo
Preston Road Kirkwell House (Former Rectory) With Boundary Wall				55°46′54″N 2°20′28″W	Category B	26575	Upload Photo
Station Road, Todlaw With Boundary Wall And Gateway				55°46′27″N 2°20′26″W	Category B	26595	Upload Photo
Tiendhillgreen, Mount View With Gatepiers And Boundary Wall				55°46′53″N 2°20′31″W	Category B	26599	Upload Photo
1 Tiendhillgreen				55°46′47″N 2°20′43″W	Category B	26600	Upload Photo
7 Tiendhillgreen With Boundary Walls				55°46′49″N 2°20′41″W	Category B	26602	Upload Photo
Bridgend, Lanark Lodge Entrance Lodge, Gatepiers And Wall				55°46′35″N 2°20′09″W	Category C(S)	26456	Upload Photo
33 Castle Street				55°46′45″N 2°20′44″W	Category C(S)	26470	Upload Photo
39 Castle Street				55°46′46″N 2°20′44″W	Category C(S)	26473	Upload Photo
53 Castle Street				55°46′48″N 2°20′46″W	Category C(S)	26478	Upload Photo
34 And 36 Castle Street				55°46′43″N 2°20′40″W	Category C(S)	26482	Upload Photo
Church Square, Old Parish Church With Boundary Wall, Gatepiers And Graveyard				55°46′40″N 2°20′32″W	Category B	26485	Upload another image See more images
Manderston, Buxley, Dairy Tower With Unicorn Stair				55°47′09″N 2°18′18″W	Category A	42510	Upload Photo
Manderston, Buxley, Telephone Kiosk				55°47′10″N 2°18′24″W	Category B	42519	Upload Photo
Manderston, Pheasantry Wood, Gamekeeper's Cottage With Dovecot				55°46′58″N 2°17′44″W	Category A	42528	Upload Photo
Turtleton Farmhouse, With Coach House, Outbuilding And Boundary Walls				55°46′29″N 2°17′44″W	Category C(S)	42542	Upload Photo
Broomhill				55°47′31″N 2°18′51″W	Category C(S)	42479	Upload Photo
Crumstane Steading				55°46′30″N 2°18′31″W	Category B	42489	Upload Photo
3 Clouds, Rosebank With Boundary Wall And Gatepiers				55°46′45″N 2°20′47″W	Category B	26488	Upload Photo
11 Clouds, St Albans With Boundary Wall, Gatepiers And Garage				55°46′45″N 2°20′51″W	Category C(S)	26491	Upload Photo
Westways, 11 Langtongate With Front Wall, Gatepiers And Railings				55°46′35″N 2°20′57″W	Category C(S)	26508	Upload Photo
7 And 8 Market Square				55°46′40″N 2°20′34″W	Category B	26519	Upload Photo
48 And 49 Market Square				55°46′39″N 2°20′38″W	Category B	26536	Upload Photo
18 Murray Street, Barniken Hotel With Boundary Wall And Gatepiers				55°46′37″N 2°20′32″W	Category B	26547	Upload Photo
37 Newtown Street				55°46′40″N 2°20′49″W	Category C(S)	26552	Upload Photo
16 Newtown Street				55°46′42″N 2°20′47″W	Category B	26559	Upload Photo
26 Newtown Street With Front Walls And Fencing				55°46′41″N 2°20′51″W	Category C(S)	26564	Upload Photo
32 Newtown Street				55°46′40″N 2°20′52″W	Category C(S)	26567	Upload Photo
1-5 (Odd Nos) North Street				55°46′39″N 2°20′42″W	Category C(S)	26571	Upload Photo
13 And 15 South Street				55°46′38″N 2°20′41″W	Category B	26580	Upload Photo
8 South Street				55°46′39″N 2°20′41″W	Category C(S)	26587	Upload Photo
Station Road, The Knoll Maternity Hospital With Boundary Wall And Gatepiers				55°46′21″N 2°20′29″W	Category B	26591	Upload Photo
Station Road, Morelands With B0Undary Wall And Gates				55°46′35″N 2°20′23″W	Category B	26592	Upload Photo
Station Road, Wellnage Stables And Cottage				55°46′32″N 2°20′24″W	Category B	26597	Upload Photo
43 Bridgend, Mainhill, With Boundary Wall And Gatepiers				55°46′36″N 2°20′08″W	Category C(S)	26459	Upload Photo
Wedderburn Castle, Lion Gate And Boundary Walls				55°46′19″N 2°18′43″W	Category A	4029	Upload another image
Wedderburn Castle, West Gate, Including South Lodge And North Outbuilding				55°45′57″N 2°19′08″W	Category C(S)	4032	Upload Photo
Manderston, Stables				55°47′05″N 2°18′28″W	Category A	4034	Upload another image
Cheeklaw Farmhouse And Gatepiers				55°46′06″N 2°20′19″W	Category C(S)	200	Upload Photo
Manderston, Buxley, Farm Court				55°47′10″N 2°18′19″W	Category B	42513	Upload Photo
Manderston, Buxley, Fire Station And Engine House With Stalk And Gatepiers				55°47′11″N 2°18′20″W	Category A	42514	Upload Photo
Manderston, Formal Garden With Golden Gates				55°47′04″N 2°18′19″W	Category B	42522	Upload Photo
Wedderburn Castle				55°46′07″N 2°18′25″W	Category A	42543	Upload Photo
Duns Castle Estate, St Mary's Cottage With Sundial				55°47′22″N 2°21′02″W	Category B	42498	Upload Photo
Kidshielhaugh Steading				55°48′23″N 2°24′25″W	Category B	42502	Upload Photo
11 Currie Street With Front Wall, Gatepiers And Railings				55°46′39″N 2°20′27″W	Category B	26497	Upload Photo
10 Market Square, Bank Of Scotland				55°46′41″N 2°20′35″W	Category C(S)	26520	Upload Photo
23 And 27 Market Square				55°46′41″N 2°20′40″W	Category C(S)	26525	Upload Photo
2 And 4 Murray Street				55°46′39″N 2°20′36″W	Category C(S)	26542	Upload Photo
8 And 10 Murray Street				55°46′39″N 2°20′35″W	Category C(S)	26544	Upload Photo
12 Murray Street With Wall				55°46′39″N 2°20′35″W	Category C(S)	26545	Upload Photo
20 Newtown Street With Boundary Wall And Gate				55°46′42″N 2°20′48″W	Category C(S)	26561	Upload Photo
Preston Road Wellfield House, With Gatepiers, Terrace And Boundary Wall				55°46′52″N 2°20′22″W	Category B	26576	Upload Photo
43 And 45 South Street				55°46′37″N 2°20′47″W	Category C(S)	26584	Upload Photo
Station Road, County Council Offices, Southfield, With Boundary Wall, Gatepiers And Gate				55°46′25″N 2°20′29″W	Category B	26594	Upload Photo
41 Bridgend, Viewlaw, With Boundary Wall, Gatepiers And Gates				55°46′36″N 2°20′10″W	Category C(S)	26458	Upload Photo
28 Bridgend With Boundary Wall And Gatepiers				55°46′35″N 2°20′12″W	Category C(S)	26462	Upload Photo
31 Castle Street				55°46′45″N 2°20′43″W	Category C(S)	26469	Upload Photo
37 Castle Street				55°46′46″N 2°20′44″W	Category C(S)	26472	Upload Photo
Duns Castle Estate, Kennels, Kennel Master's House And Water Tank				55°47′06″N 2°21′31″W	Category C(S)	4109	Upload Photo
Berrywell, With Outbuildings And Bridge				55°46′28″N 2°19′49″W	Category B	4026	Upload Photo
Manderston Including Service Court And Motor House				55°46′56″N 2°18′12″W	Category A	4033	Upload Photo

== Key ==
The scheme for classifying buildings in Scotland is:

- Category A: "buildings of national or international importance, either architectural or historic; or fine, little-altered examples of some particular period, style or building type."
- Category B: "buildings of regional or more than local importance; or major examples of some particular period, style or building type, which may have been altered."
- Category C: "buildings of local importance; lesser examples of any period, style, or building type, as originally constructed or moderately altered; and simple traditional buildings which group well with other listed buildings."

In March 2016 there were 47,288 listed buildings in Scotland. Of these, 8% were Category A, and 50% were Category B, with the remaining 42% being Category C.
