= Greenlaw Town Hall =

Municipal building in Greenlaw, Scotland

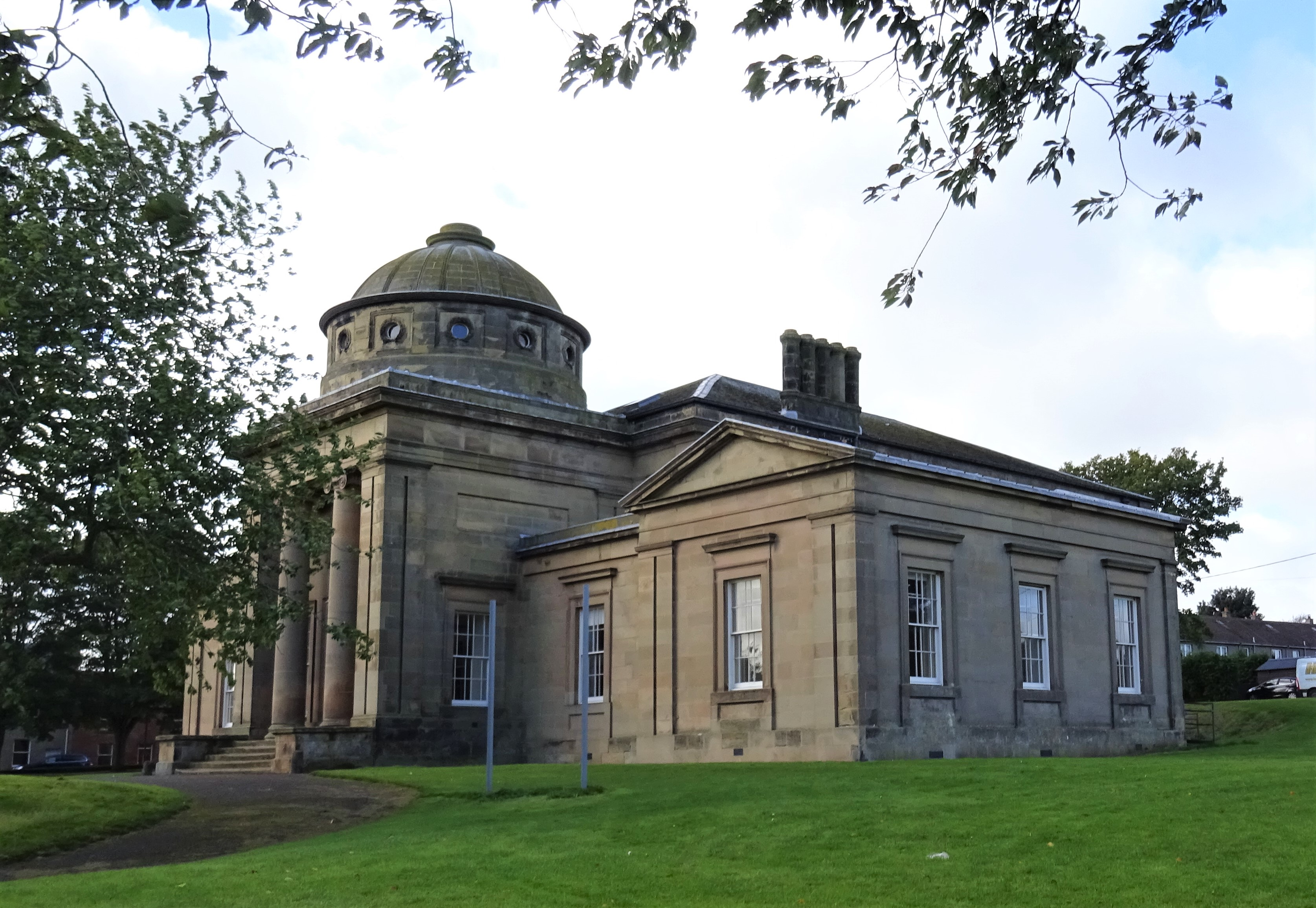
- Greenlaw Town Hall

- Shown in the Scottish Borders
- 55.7072°N 2.4608°W
- Location: The Square, Greenlaw

History
- Built: 1831

Site notes
- Architect: John Cunningham
- Architectural style: Greek Revival style

Listed Building – Category A
- Official name: Courthouse, Greenlaw
- Designated: 9 June 1971
- Reference no.: LB10492

Greenlaw Town Hall is a municipal building in The Square, Greenlaw, Scottish Borders, Scotland. The structure, which served as the county headquarters of Berwickshire in the 19th century, is a Category A listed building.

== History ==
As the then county town of Berwickshire, Greenlaw needed a building from which to dispense justice: a courthouse was erected to the west of Greenlaw Church in 1712. However, by the early 19th century, the justices decided that the old building was inadequate for their needs and it was demolished in 1830.

The current building was commissioned by Sir William Purves-Hume-Campbell, 6th Baronet at his own expense as the new county courthouse. It was designed in the Greek Revival style by John Cunningham, who had previously designed a lodge for Purves-Hume-Campbell on the Marchmont Estate. It was built by a local builder, William Waddell, in ashlar stone and was completed in 1831. The design involved a symmetrical main frontage of five bays facing onto The Square. The central bay was formed by a full-height portico with Ionic order columns and antae supporting a frieze, an entablature, a cornice and a circular structure with oculi and a domed roof. The end bays, which were projected forward as pavilions, were fenestrated by sash windows with architraves and cornices. Internally, the principal room was the main hall which served as both meeting room and courtroom: there was also a fire-proof room for the storage of the county records.

The building was initially called "County Hall", and served as the venue for the Berwickshire Sheriff Court and meeting place for the Commissioners of Supply, the main administrative body of the county prior to 1890. Greenlaw had been made county town under an act of the Scottish Parliament in 1696, taking the role from Duns. The rivalry between the two towns resurfaced in the nineteenth century. Duns had grown to be one of the larger towns in the county, whereas Greenlaw remained little more than a village. In 1853 an Act of Parliament was passed allowing the courts and commissioners' meetings to be held at Duns as well as at Greenlaw. Another courthouse, known as County Buildings, was subsequently built at 8 Newtown Street in Duns in 1856.

Elected county councils were established in 1890 under the Local Government (Scotland) Act 1889, taking over most of the functions of the commissioners. Berwickshire County Council held its first meeting on 22 May 1890 at County Hall in Greenlaw, when it decided by 18 votes to 12 that all subsequent meetings should be held at Duns. Greenlaw was still considered the official county town after 1890, despite the county council meeting in Duns and courts being held at both towns. An Act of Parliament in 1903 finally revoked Greenlaw's status as county town and declared Duns to be the county town for all purposes.

The County Hall was therefore no longer used as a courthouse after 1903. As the building had been gifted to the county by William Purves-Hume-Campbell, on ceasing to be used for county purposes ownership reverted to his heir, John Hume-Purves-Campbell, who in turn donated it to Greenlaw Parish Council. The building re-opened in November 1904, when it was renamed "Town Hall" and was subsequently used as a community events venue. A war memorial, designed in the form of a stone sarcophagus and intended to commemorate the lives of local service personnel who had died in the First World War, was unveiled in front of the building by the Lord Lieutenant of Berwickshire, Captain Charles Balfour, in November 1920.

During the Second World War, the building accommodated elements of the Polish I Corps and, after the war, a plaque was installed in the building to commemorate the life of Lieutenant Colonel Julius Francis Chenevix-Trench of the Northumberland Fusiliers, who had commanded the local battalion of the Home Guard during the war. The building was then converted for use as a swimming pool in the early 1970s.

Following local government reorganisation in 1975, ownership of the building passed to a trust which commissioned a programme of restoration works which was carried out to a design by David Mylne and completed in 1985. The building then served as a sale room for an antiques business before falling vacant in 1998. The condition of the building again deteriorated, and it was placed on the Buildings at Risk Register for Scotland in 2001. It was one of the buildings shortlisted in the 2006 BBC television series Restoration Village. An extensive programme of refurbishment works financed by Historic Scotland was then undertaken, to a design by Adam Dudley Architects, by Campbell & Smith Construction Group at a cost of £1.9 million. The building was officially re-opened by the Duke of Rothesay in May 2011.

== See also ==
- List of listed buildings in Greenlaw, Scottish Borders
- List of Category A listed buildings in the Scottish Borders
