= Henry Pooley & Son =

Manufacturer of weighing machines

Henry Pooley & Son Ltd was a mechanical engineering company specialising in the manufacture of weighing machines. It was based in Liverpool and later in Birmingham, England.

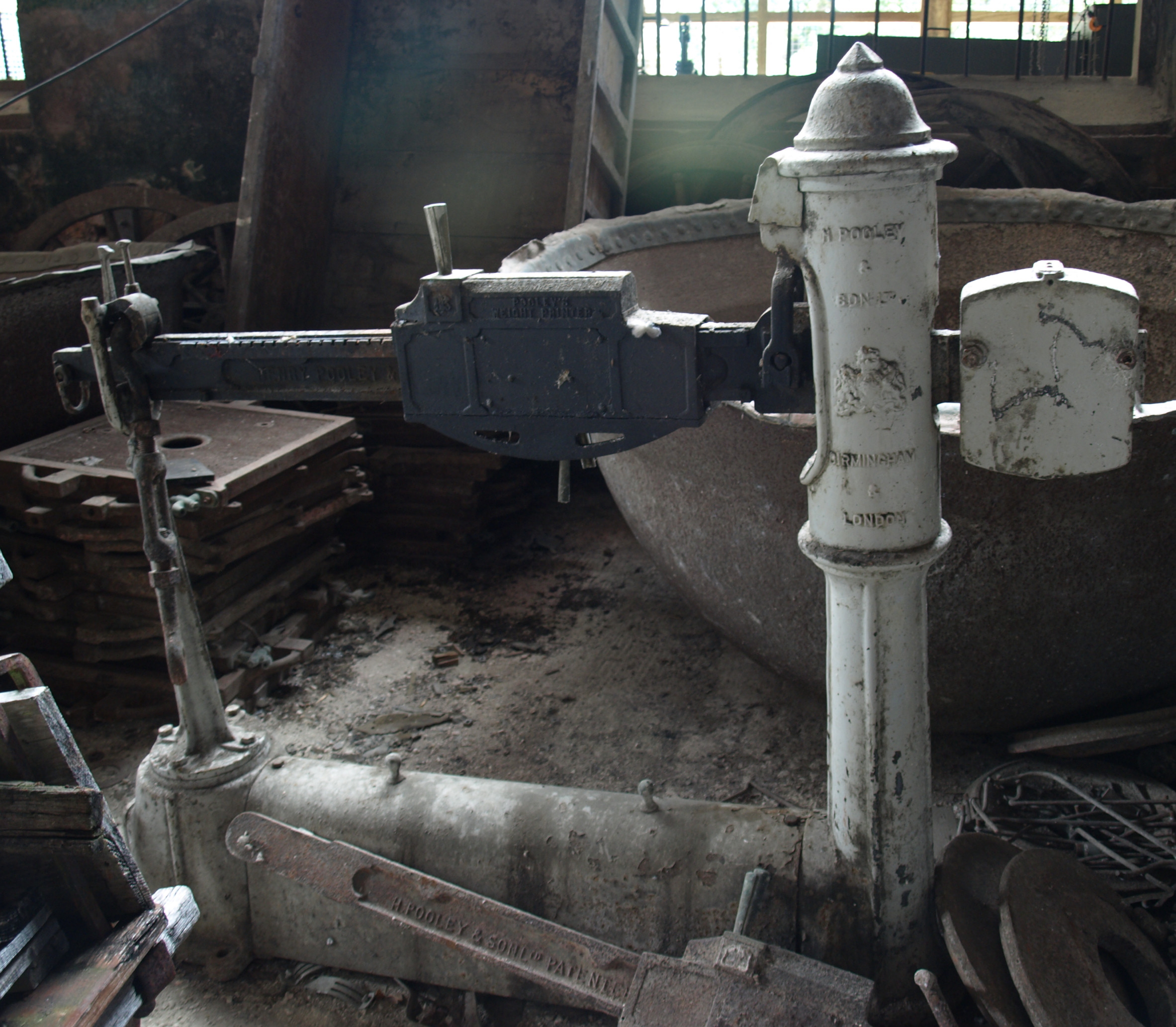
A weight printer manufactured by Pooley & Son

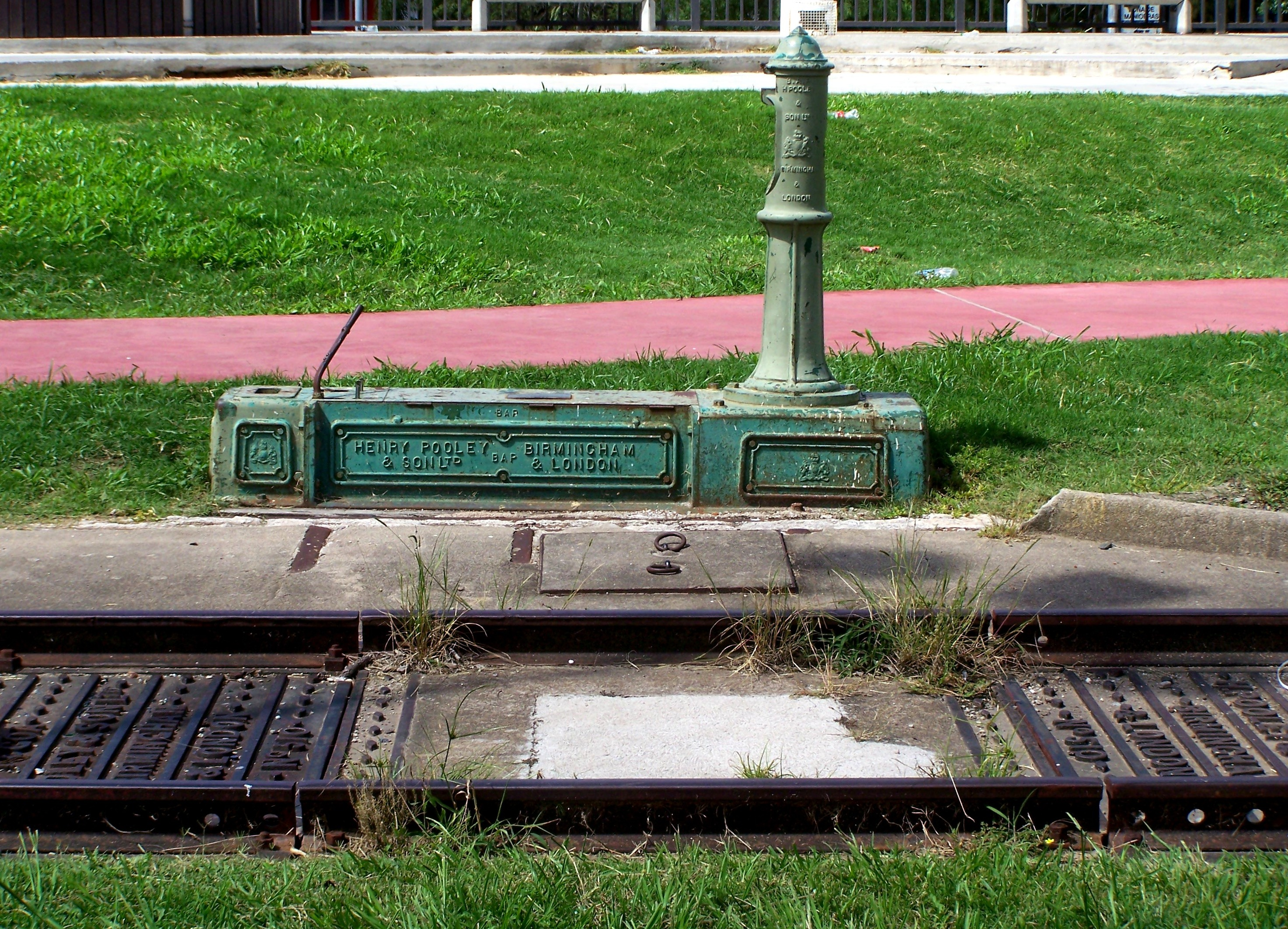
weighing machines.F.C.G.O.A. Villa María, Córdoba, Argentina

The company was absorbed into W & T Avery. An example of the company's weighing machines can be found on Platform 2 of Ipswich railway station in Suffolk. There is also a luggage weighing scale made by Pooley on the railway station platform at Haverthwaite in Cumbria.

Another example of the company's weighing machine can be seen in Ezhukone Railway station, Kerala, India, which is a part of the kollam-Sengottai section of Indian Railways. The machine is still functional and is used even today. The Kollam–Sengottai section is part of the Kollam–Chennai metre-gauge rail route commissioned by the British in 1904. Another example can be found at Kundara (KUV) station on the Kollam-Madurai route via Tenkasi, the machine is functional and sits near platform #1

Another example of the company's railway engine weighing scales can be found in the grounds of the Queen Victoria Museum and Art Gallery in Launceston, Tasmania, Australia.

Another example of the company's agricultural weighing scales in its original position can be found in the grounds of Cragend Farm, Northumberland England United Kingdom.

A 1930 dated example of the company's 20 ton weighbridge can be found at a disused railway station in Briar Close, Evesham, UK.

Another example of the company's engine weighing equipment can be found at the Surrey Hills Community Centre on Union Road, Surrey Hills, Melbourne, Victoria, Australia.

A Locomotive Balancing Table made for the Victorian Railways in 1912 can be found at the Newport Workshops in Melbourne, Australia. It is operational and used regularly to weigh & balance steam locomotives by Steamrail Victoria.

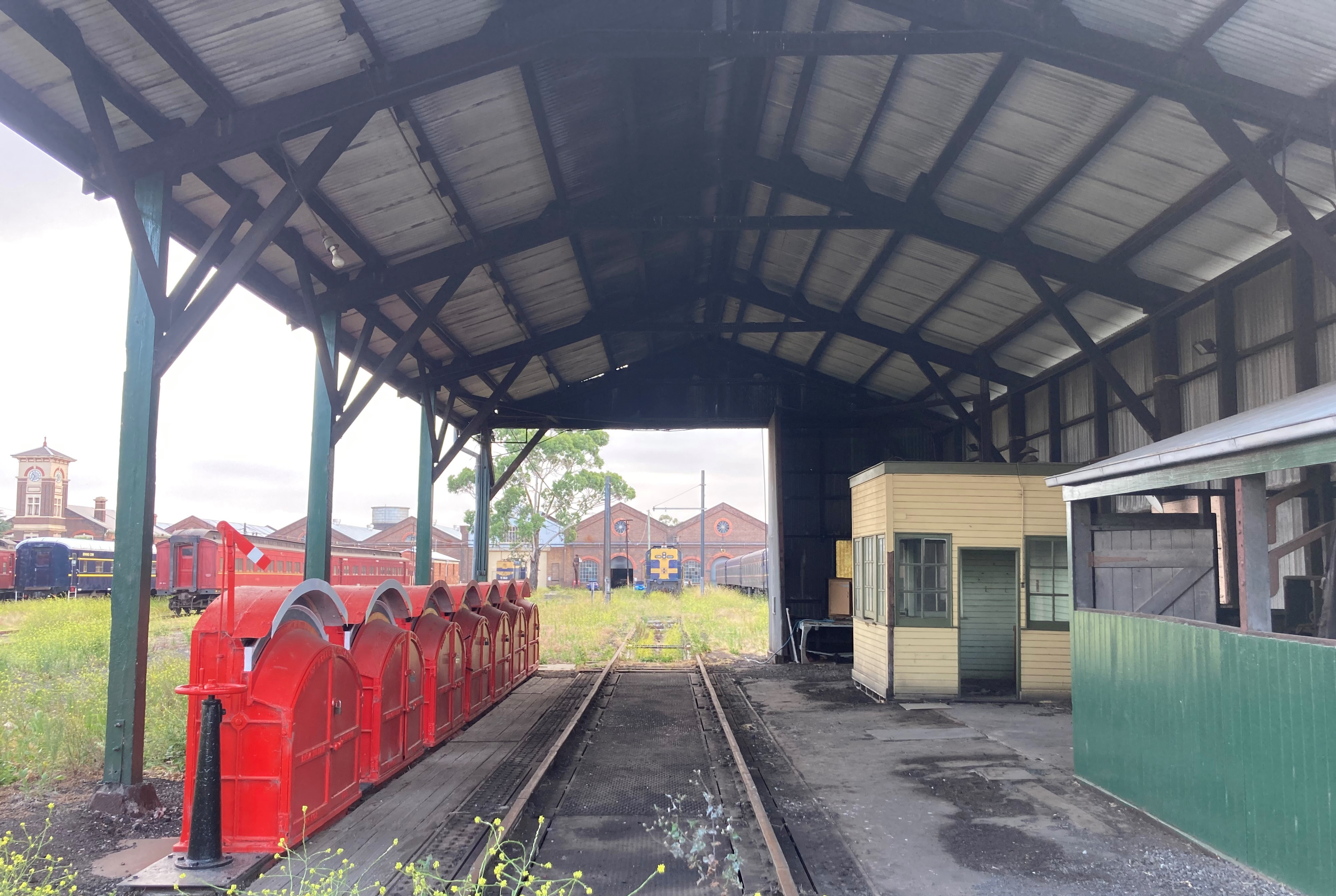
Operational Locomotive Balancing Table at the Newport Workshops

A base of a machine manufactured in 1920 is still embedded in the up platform at Redruth station in Cornwall.

A working example of a narrow gauge railway Pooley weighbridge can be found at the Talyllyn Railway in Tywyn in Wales where the original weighbridge was restored after it had been removed from its original location on what is now the platform at Wharf station.

In October 2025, the Festiniog Railway Heritage Group launched a project to reinstall the Pooley weighbridge at Boston Lodge in the location it occupied from 1857 to 1872. In 1872 the double table weighbridge equipment was moved to Minffordd where it remained until 1976 when it was removed and stored. This equipment was used to weigh slate waggons travelling from the mines in Blaenau Ffestiniog to Portmadoc [sic] and goods provisions travelling back to the mines.

In Brazil, it is possible to find a well-preserved example of an H. Pooley & Son scale at the Guararema railway museum.

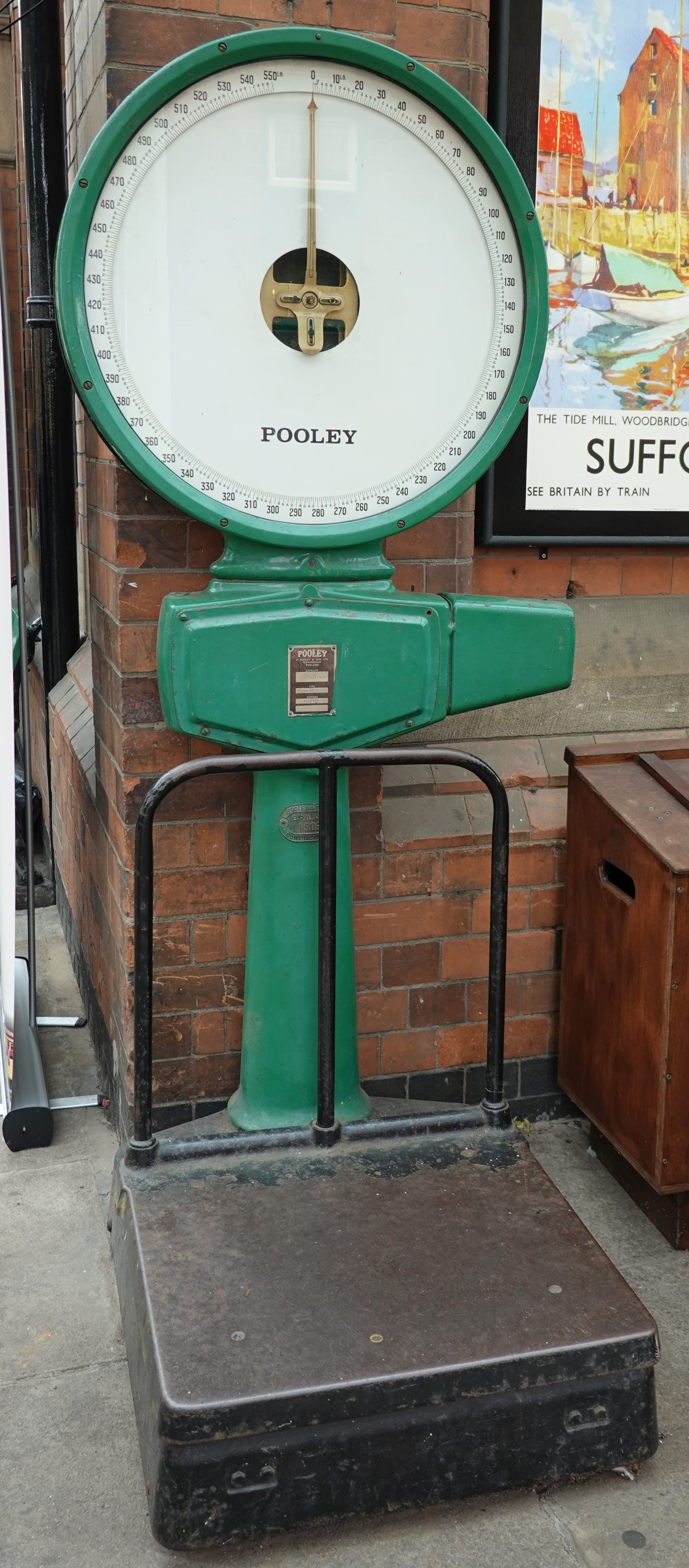
Pooley weighing machine calibrated in lbs, originally supplied to British Railways, now at the preserved GCR
