= Arthur Hill Holme =

Liverpool Architect

Arthur Hill Holme (1814–1857) was a Liverpool architect and brother of builder Samuel Holme, who served as Mayor of Liverpool in 1852–1853.

== Life and career ==
Holme trained with Thomas Rickman in Birmingham and won the design competition for the Mechanics Institute in Mount Street (now Liverpool Institute for Performing Arts) but because of his junior status the work was carried out under the supervision of James Picton and the institute opened in 1837. Holme mostly designed in the neoclassical style typical of Liverpool at this time.

Sometime after 1834 Holme formed a partnership with Scottish architect John Cunningham and collaborated on the design of the roof for the train shed at Liverpool Lime Street station, his brother's firm being responsible for its construction. The station opened in 1836.

In the same year a start was made on St Anne's Church at Aigburth, and the following year the partnership undertook the Apothecaries Hall in Colquitt Street, followed by the Union Bank in Brunswick Street and Holy Trinity church, Price Street, Birkenhead (opened 1838, demolished 1970s).

The partnership may not have thrived as it terminated in 1840 with Arthur joining his brother's firm as architect and draughtsman, living in accommodation over the yard offices. This is presumably 8–10 Benson Street which Sharples ascribes to Arthur Holme c. 1842.

Arthur was not, however, taken on as a partner. In his biography Samuel Holme is critical of his brother's "extravagant" designs which frequently ate into the company's profits when building common structures with, in Samuel's estimation, unnecessary elaboration.

Arthur Hill Holme was responsible for design of a replacement for St Matthias's church which was displaced during construction of Great Howard Street railway station.

Sharples attributes no.27 Castle Street to Arthur Holme. Located in what was originally Liverpool's business quarter, the building has a pediment with Corinthian columns and was built in 1846 for lawyer and developer Ambrose Lace.

The same year saw the start of St Paul's church in Prince's Park. Designed by Holme in the gothic revival style, it was opened two years later and demolished in 1974.

Holme also designed the School for the Blind on Hardman Street which opened in 1851 having been displaced from London Road on extension of Lime Street station. Sharples comments on its "elegant classical front". It is currently used as a restaurant.

When the Music Hall on Concert Square was destroyed by fire in 1852, Holme designed a replacement which opened the following year and remains in use as a bar.

Arthur Hill Holme died in 1857.
