= Greenlaw =

Town in the Scottish Borders

Coordinates: 55.7065°N 2.463°W

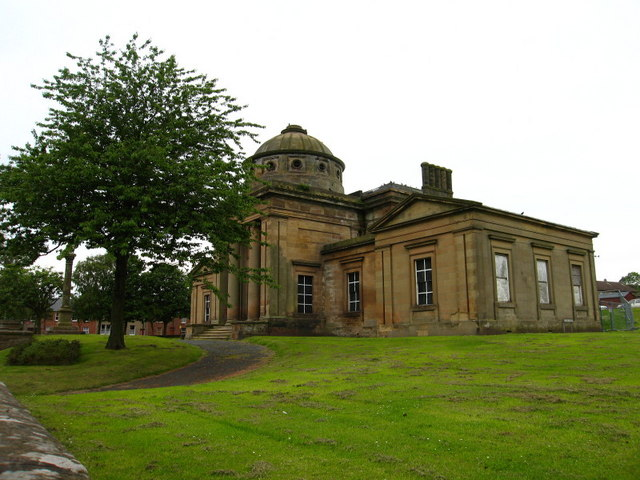
- Greenlaw Town Hall

- Location within the Scottish Borders
- Population: 600 (2020)
- OS grid reference: NT710460
- Civil parish: Greenlaw
- Council area: Scottish Borders
- Lieutenancy area: Berwickshire
- Country: Scotland
- Sovereign state: United Kingdom
- Post town: DUNS
- Postcode district: TD10
- Dialling code: 01361
- Police: Scotland
- Fire: Scottish
- Ambulance: Scottish
- UK Parliament: Berwickshire, Roxburgh and Selkirk
- Scottish Parliament: Ettrick, Roxburgh and Berwickshire

Greenlaw is a town and civil parish situated in the foothills of the Lammermuir Hills on Blackadder Water at the junction of the A697 and the A6105 in the Scottish Borders area of Scotland. At the 2001 census, the parish had a population of 661.

== History ==
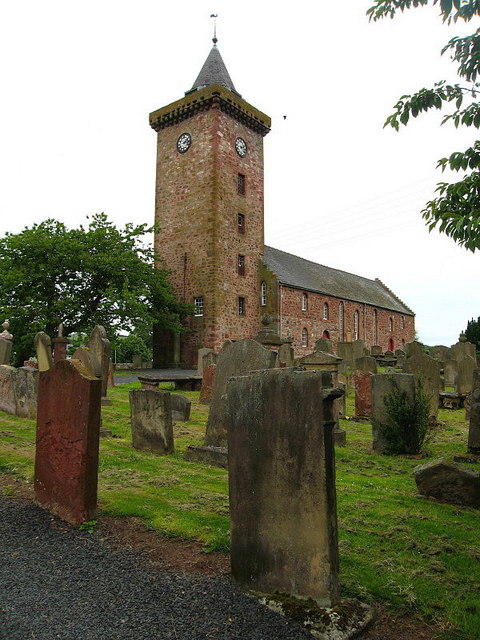
Greenlaw Church completed in 1675

Greenlaw was first made the county town of Berwickshire in 1596. At that time, Greenlaw was situated about 1 mile (1.6 km) south of the present village, atop a hill - the 'Green Law'. This area is now known as Old Greenlaw.

Greenlaw Act 1696
- Act of Parliament
- Parliament of Scotland
- Long title: Act declaring the Burgh of Greenlaw head Burgh of the Shire of Berwick.
- Citation: c. 16 [12mo ed: c. 16]

Dates
- Royal assent: 9 October 1696

Other legislation
- Repealed by: Berwickshire County Town Act 1903

Status: Repealed

In 1661, county town status was lost to Duns by an act of Parliament, the Duns Act 1661 (c. 136). When Patrick, Earl of Marchmont attained the barony of Greenlaw in the 1670s, he made it his business to restore what he saw as the rights and privileges that came with the barony. In 1696 he succeeded: an act of Parliament, the Greenlaw Act 1696 (c. 16), was passed, laying down in statute that the town of Greenlaw should be the Head Burgh of Berwickshire.

However, attempts were made in 1739, 1790 and 1810 to take the rights and privileges from Greenlaw and make Duns the county town once more. Though unsuccessful in their primary aim, the grounds were laid for the Berwickshire Courts Act 1853 (16 & 17 Vict. c. 27), which authorising sheriff and commissary courts to be held at Duns. Another courthouse, known as County Buildings, was subsequently built at 8 Newtown Street in Duns in 1856. When Berwickshire County Council was created it held its first meeting on 22 May 1890 at County Hall in Greenlaw, when it decided by 18 votes to 12 that all subsequent meetings should be held at Duns. Greenlaw was still considered the official county town after 1890, despite the county council meeting in Duns and courts being held at both towns. The Berwickshire County Town Act 1903 (3 Edw. 7. c. 5) finally revoked Greenlaw's status as county town and declared Duns to be the county town for all purposes.

There is also a fine church, built in 1675, on earlier foundations. The corbie step gables preserve a feature of the architecture of that period. The church was expanded during the eighteenth century and completed in its present form around 1855.

After Greenlaw became a county town in 1696, the church tower was planned as a tolbooth or prison and was completed by 1712. Its style was adapted to present the appearance of a Church Tower. It is unique in structure – square rising to a height of 60 ft (18 m) and ending in a corballed parapet from which an 18 ft (5.5 m) steeple rises. The old iron gate or yett is the original one of 1712. A Court House also completed in 1712 stood on the west side of the tower, therefore by 1712 there stood by the side of the Church, a Tolbooth and Court House, hence the rhyme:

"Here stands the Gospel and the Law, Wi' Hell's Hole atween the twa"

A new jail was built in the town in 1824. This was used throughout the Victorian period but was taken out of use in the 20th century and demolished in the 1960s.

Greenlaw Town Hall, completed in 1831, is a listed building from its county town era and was one of the buildings shortlisted in the 2006 BBC television series Restoration Village.

Greenlaw Golf Club (now defunct) first appeared in the mid-1920s. The club disappeared some time in the 1950s.

== Facilities ==
Shops include the Blackadder Mini-market, Romanes pharmacy, Waldie's butchers and the Village Store. The Post Office closed in 2010 and Greenlaw is now served by a mobile post office. There was a branch of the Royal Bank of Scotland, but this closed in 2014.

Since 1992 the village has been home to 'STOPS', the Scottish Theatre Organ Preservation Society, which Charitable Trust created its base in a custom converted building now known as the New Palace Theatre Organ Heritage Centre, in the 75 seat multi-purpose auditorium of which is housed the world famous Hilsdon organ from the Edinburgh Playhouse as well as the Hilsdon organs of the Palace Picture House, Edinburgh and the Picture House, Paisley. The Centre draws visitors to Greenlaw from all over the world and the resident organist of the Centre, Larry McGuire, was one of the two people ultimately responsible for saving the Edinburgh Playhouse from demolition in 1975.

An amateur Weather Centre was established at the Centre in 2006, the data from which was launched as bordersweather.co.uk, which website was initially conceived to give travellers to the Centre an idea of what weather to expect during their visit. The website has grown and is now a respected member of a nationwide chain of independent weather stations and its webcam is viewed by thousands daily during periods of snow.

The web designer of the site also established the Interactive Independent Climate Change Project which records data from a number of amateur Weather Stations around the UK, some of whom have data going back for over 25 years.

Greenlaw Castle was a manor house located to the east of the town. It was owned by a branch of the Home family, including the surgeon Robert Boyne Home (1713–1786), father of Sir Everard Home and Anne Hunter. It ceased to be used as a laird's house in 1729, and was demolished around 1820.

== Geography ==
Places nearby include Eccles, Legerwood, Gordon, Westruther, Polwarth, Fogo, Leitholm and Duns.

=== Climate ===
Greenlaw has an oceanic climate (Köppen: Cfb). There is a Met Office weather station located at RAF Charterhall, 3 miles (5 km) to the east.

Climate data for Charterhall (112 m or 367 ft asl, averages 1991–2020)
Month	Jan	Feb	Mar	Apr	May	Jun	Jul	Aug	Sep	Oct	Nov	Dec	Year
Mean daily maximum °C (°F)	6.2 (43.2)	6.9 (44.4)	9.0 (48.2)	11.7 (53.1)	14.5 (58.1)	17.2 (63.0)	19.5 (67.1)	19.5 (67.1)	16.9 (62.4)	12.8 (55.0)	9.0 (48.2)	6.4 (43.5)	12.5 (54.4)
Mean daily minimum °C (°F)	0.9 (33.6)	1.1 (34.0)	2.1 (35.8)	3.7 (38.7)	5.9 (42.6)	8.7 (47.7)	10.4 (50.7)	10.3 (50.5)	8.7 (47.7)	6.1 (43.0)	3.0 (37.4)	0.9 (33.6)	5.1 (41.3)
Average rainfall mm (inches)	57.5 (2.26)	50.0 (1.97)	49.2 (1.94)	48.2 (1.90)	48.7 (1.92)	65.1 (2.56)	70.0 (2.76)	71.8 (2.83)	60.0 (2.36)	80.3 (3.16)	76.4 (3.01)	69.3 (2.73)	746.5 (29.4)
Average rainy days (≥ 1 mm)	13.2	10.9	10.2	10.0	10.4	10.8	11.7	11.4	10.5	12.6	13.4	13.3	138.4
Mean monthly sunshine hours	58.8	80.2	124.3	167.0	188.0	193.0	177.0	169.1	139.8	99.8	78.8	50.7	1,526.5
Source: Met Office

== Notable residents ==
Notable people born in Greenlaw include:

- George Linen (1802–1888), Scottish-American painter
- Williamson Blyth (1827–1897), violin-maker, musician and tinsmith
- Thomas Gibson (1825–1901), Ontario politician
- Prof George Gibson FRSE (1858–1930), mathematician thought to be the nephew of the above

== See also ==
- List of places in the Scottish Borders
- List of places in Scotland
