= Walter Kerr (disambiguation) =

Walter Kerr (1913–1996) was an American writer and Broadway theatre critic.

Walter Kerr may also refer to:

- Lord Walter Kerr (1839–1927), Royal Navy officer
- Walter Hume Kerr (1861–1936), Scottish engineer, antiquary and amateur archaeologist
- Walter Boardman Kerr (1911–2003), American journalist, publisher and book author
- Walter Kerr (rugby union) (1930–1976), Scotland international rugby union player
