= Duns Castle =

Castle in Scottish Borders, Scotland

Coordinates: 55°46′56″N 2°21′21″W

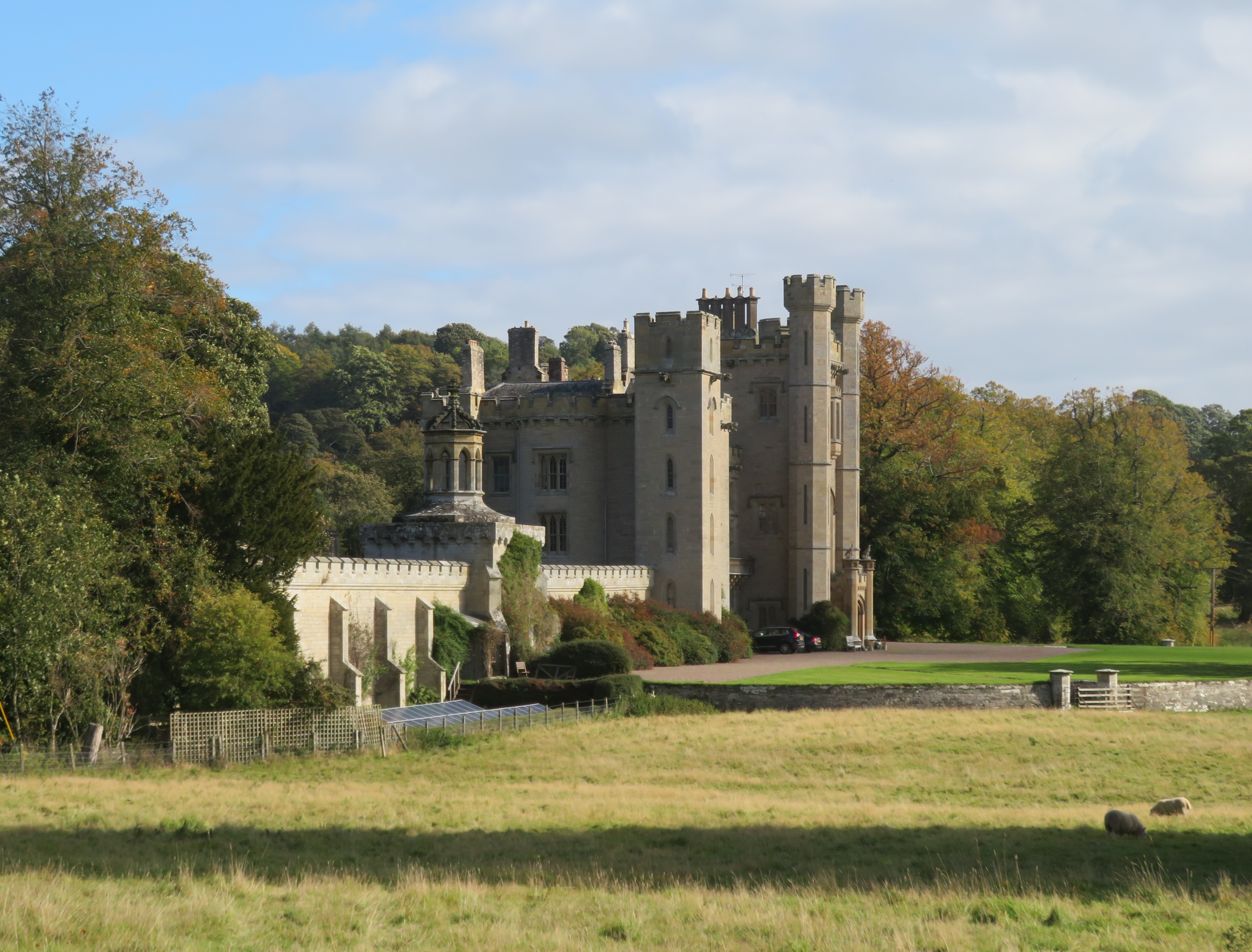
- Duns Castle in 2025
- Interactive map of Duns Castle

Listed Building – Category A

Inventory of Gardens and Designed Landscapes in Scotland
- Official name: Duns Castle
- Designated: 30 June 1987
- Reference no.: GDL00161

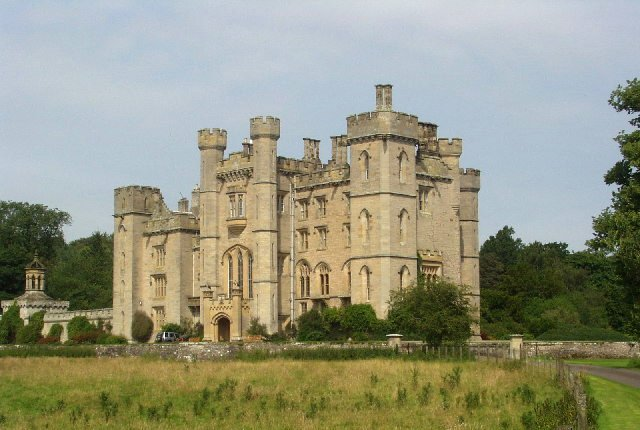
Duns Castle in 2004

Duns Castle, Duns, Berwickshire is a historic house in Scotland, the oldest part of which, the massive Norman Keep or Pele Tower, supposedly dates from 1320. The castle and most of the structures on the property are designated as a Category A listed building.

== History ==
The early history of the building is virtually unknown. A keep was built on the lands granted to Thomas Randolph, 1st Earl of Moray by King Robert the Bruce in 1320. That structure may have been razed by the English in the 16th century, possibly during the Rough Wooing in 1545 when the nearby town of Duns was burned to the ground, as that the part of the building claimed to date from that time has been assessed as dating from the 15th – 16th century by architectural historians.

The manor and its castle appear to have passed into the hands of Patrick V, Earl of March after Randolph's death in 1332. After the Battle of Halidon Hill the following year the manor was granted by King Edward III of England to Thomas de Bradestan. There were multiple changes of ownership afterwards.

During the First Bishops' War of 1639, the castle housed General Alexander Leslie, 1st Earl of Leven. His army was quartered nearby and blocked the English from advancing into Scotland. Neither side wished to fight and negotiations began that led to the Pacification of Berwick that ended the war. In 1670 Sir James Cockburn of Cockburn bought the estate and burgh of Duns from Hume of Ayton. The manor was sold to William Hay of Drumelzier, son of John Hay, 1st Earl of Tweeddale in 1698 and it has remained in the family ever since.

The original keep is claimed to have been incorporated into the building as it was expanded into an L-shaped structure at an unknown date. It was remodeled shortly its acquisition and again in 1791–1798 by the architect John Baxter. The house was transformed into a Gothic castle, 1818–1822, by architect James Gillespie Graham. The interior woodwork was carved by the noted sculptor, Sir John Steell, during his apprenticeship.

There is a publicly accessible park and two man-made lakes, the Hen Poo and the smaller Mill Dam that form the Duns Castle nature reserve.

The castle and its outbuildings are currently available as a venue for weddings and corporate functions, with accommodation available for the guests.

== Bibliography ==
- Groome, F.H., Ordnance Gazetteer of Scotland: A Survey of Scottish Topography, Statistical, Biographical, and Historical, VI vols, Edinburgh, 1884.
