= Babylon Mystery Religion =

Book published by the Ralph Woodrow Evangelistic Association

- Title page for Babylon Mystery Religion (1966)
- Author: Ralph Woodrow
- Language: English
- Genre: Religion
- Publication date: 1966

Babylon Mystery Religion is a book first published in 1966 and reprinted in 1981 by the Ralph Woodrow Evangelistic Association. In the book Woodrow draws parallels between ancient Babylonian rituals and those found in Judaism and the Roman Catholic Church. It is based on Alexander Hislop's book The Two Babylons.

Babylon Mystery Religion is now out of print and a second book is available entitled The Babylon Connection? in which Woodrow recants and refutes his views previously presented in Babylon Mystery Religion. An online statement from the author can be found at the website.
