= Helen Lowe (chartered accountant) =

Scottish accountant, charity worker, and activist

Helen Lowe MBE
- Born: 10 December 1897; Duns, Berwickshire, Scotland
- Died: 6 November 1997 (aged 99); Edinburgh, Scotland
- Occupation: Chartered Accountant
- Honours: Member of the Most Excellent Order of the British Empire (MBE)

Helen Millar Lowe MBE (10 December 1897 – 6 November 1997) was a Scottish accountant, charity worker and activist. She was one of the first women to become chartered accountants in Scotland, and conducted a successful campaign to ensure that the Bruntsfield Hospital for Women and the Elsie Inglis Memorial Maternity Hospital in Edinburgh remained staffed exclusively by qualified female medical professionals.

== Early life ==
The daughter of James Lowe and Margaret Trotter, Lowe attended Berwickshire High School in Duns until the age of 16, when she decided to abandon her studies and begin, instead, a career at the Post Office Savings Bank in London.

To her father's dismay, Lowe lived and worked as a clerk in London throughout WWI, only returning to Scotland years later to take up a post as an apprentice with the firm Chiene & Tate in Edinburgh.

== Career in accountancy ==
Thanks to the Sex Disqualification (Removal) Act 1919, Lowe was able to begin pursuing a career in accountancy. In preparation for her examinations, Lowe attended classes at The University of Edinburgh, gaining certificates in Accounting and Business Methods and Mercantile Law.

In 1926, after nine years of training at Cheine & Tate, Lowe became one of the first women in Scotland to officially qualify as a Chartered Accountant. Two years later, Lowe set up her private accountancy business in Queen Street, Edinburgh, which she personally ran for most of her life.

== Charitable work ==
Lowe was a keen participant in the life of her community, and was actively engaged in the work of many charities and societies, particularly those benefiting women and the elderly. She served as honorary treasurer for a number of organisations including the Scottish Women's Lyceum Club, the Women's Maintenance Council of the Royal Infirmary, the Scottish Society of Women Artists and the Saltire Society.

=== The Bruntsfield Hospital for Women and the Elsie Inglis Memorial Hospital ===
In 1957, following a decision by the South Eastern Regional Hospital Board of Scotland to advertise a vacancy occurring at the Brunstfield Hospital for Women and the Elsie Inglis Memorial Hospital as open to both male and female qualified applicants, Lowe began campaigning to perpetuate the hospitals' special status as institutions staffed solely by legally qualified medical women.

Lowe's campaign lasted several months and involved many organised events and protests, as well as delegation visits to the Regional Board and the Secretary of State. Eventually, having seen her requests refused on multiple occasions, Lowe, with the help of nine more local women, took the issue to the Court of Session, where a judgement in favour of the campaign was achieved. In May 1958, a female medical practitioner was finally appointed to the post.

== Honours ==
As part of the New Year Honours in 1964, Lowe was awarded an MBE for her work in support of various charitable organisations in service of the elderly.
