= Agnes S. Falconer =

19th-century Scottish poet

- Born: 1868; Duns, Berwickshire
- Died: 1951 (aged 82–83)
- Occupations: Poet; Short Fiction
- Relatives: Mary W. M. Falconer (sister)
- Writing career
- Notable works: Wishing Wood, and Other Verses (1911); Whinblossom (1904)

Agnes S. Falconer (1868-1951) was a Scottish writer and poet who grew up with her sister Mary W. M. Falconer (1868-1951), also Scottish writer and poet, in Duns, Berwickshire, Scotland. Agnes authored two volumes of poetry: Whinblossom (1904) and Wishing Wood, and Other Verses (1911), in addition to contributing poetry and short fiction to a range of Scottish and English newspapers and periodicals with her sister between 1880 and the early 1910s. Agnes is known to have written under the pseudonym A. S. F. as well as Allan F. Percy. Scrapbooks belonging to the Falconer sisters are housed by the Scottish Borders Archive and Local History Centre in Hawick.

== Early life and education ==
Agnes S. Falconer was born in 1868 to Allan Falconer, an ironmonger and merchant. She was the younger sister of Mary Falconer. Her uncle, James Swan, was a stationer, bookseller and printer in Duns. The two sisters had a comfortable middle-class upbringing, as the family kept a servant and sometimes a lodger in the house. Agnes followed her sister in attending Duns Public School.

== Career ==
Agnes S. Falconer was involved in the Berwickshire Women's Liberal Association, and served as secretary between 1892 and 1897. She was also a member of the Executive of the Scottish Women's Liberal Federation, the British Women's Temperance Association and Women's Rural Institute. During World War I, Agnes published two war poems, Scottish Nurses in Serbia (c.1915) and Territorials (1917). As well as writing various pieces for the press, she published two volumes of poetry, Whinblossom (1904) and Wishing Wood (1911).

The Society Promoting Christian Knowledge wrote a book about Agnes Falconer. The book centered on her life history, and the story of her live, her struggles, and resilience.

== Publications ==
Agnes published some works.

- Wishing Wood, and Other Verses.
- Home Life at Greystone Lodge (Hardcover).
- Whinblossom A Book Of Verses. (Hardcover).
