= Walter Veith =

South African creationist (born 1949)

Walter Julius Veith
- Born: January 25, 1949 (age 77); South Africa
- Occupations: Evangelist, author, speaker, professor, pastor
- Known for: Evangelist for Clash Of Minds on nutrition, creationism, and "last day events."
- Website: clashofminds.com

Walter Julius Veith (born 1949) is a South African zoologist and a Seventh-day Adventist author and speaker known for his work in nutrition, creationism and Biblical exegesis.

Veith was professor of the zoology department at the University of Cape Town and taught in the medical bioscience department. During this time, the department was awarded a Royal Society London grant for zoological research.

After joining the Seventh-day Adventist Church, he rejected the theory of evolution in favor of creationism and so had to give up teaching at a series of South African universities.

As a creationist, his lectures, videos, and books promote creationist and Adventist beliefs and doctrines. These include an evangelical understanding of the Bible with a commitment to the Textus Receptus and the King James Version of the Bible. He also promotes a vegan diet and a belief in the imminent fulfillment of Biblical End Times and the return of Jesus Christ.

Veith has written a number of books, including Diet and Health and The Genesis Conflict, which gives a biblical perspective and evidence claimed to support young Earth creationism. He is the evangelist of Clash Of Minds, a non-profit worldwide ministry based in Limpopo, South Africa.

== Life ==
=== Childhood ===
Walter Veith was born in 1949 and grew up in a strict Catholic home. His mother, a Protestant, died early from cancer. Veith was told by his religion teacher that because of his mother's non-Catholic beliefs, she would "languish forever and ever" in hell. This prompted Veith to become an atheist at the age of ten.

=== Study ===
In 1971, Walter Veith began studying zoology at the University of Stellenbosch, where he graduated with a Master of Science in zoology. His thesis dealt with the propagation of dwarf chameleons. A two-year postgraduate course at the University of Cape Town followed in 1979. His thesis was an Autoradiographic and Electron Microscopic study of embryonic nutrition in the teleost Clinus superciliosus. He also attended lectures on zoology at the universities of Durban-Westville and Stellenbosch. Veith's research field is nutritional physiology, concentrating on the effect of modern animal husbandry on the incidence of disease transferral to humans. His research concentrates on degenerative diseases caused by incorrect nutrition and particularly on diseases such as osteoporosis, cardiovascular diseases, and also on fertility.

== Teaching and religious development ==
After graduation, Veith became an adjunct professor at the University of Stellenbosch, giving lectures in zoology until 1987.

Early in the 1980s, after his young son fell seriously ill (believing it was demonic possession) and recovered, allegedly with the help of a Catholic priest, he and his wife returned to the Catholic faith. But, a few years later, he developed doubts about Catholicism and, through the influence of a craftsman who renovated his kitchen, he and his wife joined the Adventist faith.

In his first lectures as an adjunct professor, he had had a student who rejected what she called the lie of evolutionism and instead maintained the truth of the biblical creation story. He soundly put her in her place. Now, his new faith and his own Bible studies led him to adopt this belief, which brought him into conflict with what he was teaching. Because of his lectures on the alleged scientific evidence for the biblical creation story, he was asked to leave the University of Stellenbosch.

He sold his house in Stellenbosch and accepted a position as associate professor at the University of the Western Cape in zoology. His serious concerns about the theory of evolution had been resolved by the proviso that he only needed to carry out research.

The university closed temporarily due to race riots. This gave Veith the opportunity to travel to California and visit Ariel Roth, a creationist in charge of the Adventist Geoscience Research Institute, Loma Linda. He researched evidence of the biblical story of creation, and developed a series of lectures to present his findings.

The following year, Veith received a one-year contract at the University of Cape Town. His creationist lectures meant that his contract was not renewed, but he was hired in a research-only position at the University of the Western Cape. At this time, Veith began to hold lectures outside university. Initially, his talks were mainly to Adventist congregations in the United States, then in Canada, Australia and Europe. In his lectures on nutrition, he promoted Adventist values such as vegetarianism and fasting. His first book was published in 1998 under the title of Diet and Health.

In 1995, he became a full professor with tenure and the head of the Department of Zoology, the content also dealt with the theory of evolution after five years. He used his position among other things to promote his belief in creationism and to deny the theory of evolution, finding a fellow believer in these views in his colleague Quincy Johnson. In 1997, he published his results in The Genesis Conflict.

After conflicts at the University of the Western Cape due to their unorthodox views, Walter Veith and Quincy Johnson left the department of zoology. Johnson joined the Department of Microbiology, while Veith joined the Department of Physiology, where he worked until 2003. With this change, their right to teach zoology was withdrawn. Since his retirement from teaching physiology, Veith has devoted his time to pastoring.

== Lectures ==
Veith teaches in his lectures the basic pillars of Adventism, which he believes are an extension of the Reformation's founding principles including Sola Gracia, Sola Christos, and Sola Scriptura–Grace alone, Christ alone, the Bible alone and a pillar of the Reformation: the identity of the Antichrist. He states that Adventism has proceeded from the beliefs of the Reformation, which eventually fell into creeds and made five key discoveries along with the Three Angels' Messages," which make the Adventist denomination unique:

"The Sanctuary doctrine—the whole plan of salvation laid out in type. The ceremonial law God gave to ancient Israel symbolizes Jesus' work throughout history. As the people started unraveling this plan, they began to understand the ministry of Jesus and what had happened on the day of their disappointment.

"Out of the sanctuary doctrine and the Great Disappointment, the great message of the Second Advent was formed, the truth about the Sabbath was recovered, A Biblical understanding of the state of the dead was unraveled, and the Spirit of Prophecy was established."

Veith has also presented lectures on diet, how it directly impacts numerous degenerative diseases including his findings of the negative effects caused by poor nutrition, such as osteoporosis, arthritis, and cancer. He also lectures on creationism.

== Veith's view of the KJV Bible ==
Veith holds that some of the new versions of the Bible coming out came from manuscripts with corruptions introduced by the Alexandrian text and varies and is less reliable than the Majority Text. The Adventist church does not hold a KJV only view, although a number of Adventists continue to prefer the King James Version. Because of his 2004 lecture War of the Bibles, Veith was denied access to SDA churches in Germany for a time but was reinstated in 2010.

A periodical recommended that Veith "revise from scratch future comments on this topic to be balanced, fair and serious or to dispense with them".

The Adventist Biblical Research Institute disagrees with Veith's view of Bible translations.

== Conspiracy theories ==
Spectrum magazine, an independent periodical focusing on Adventism, refers to Walter Veith as the leading conspiratory voice within Adventism.

Without specifically naming Veith, the church's official paper, the Adventist Review, has addressed Veith's conspiracy theories. Veith responded to the Review author explaining his views further.

In May 2020, the head office of the Seventh-day Adventist Church in Southern Africa, the Southern Africa Union Conference, issued a statement repudiating claims that Veith made that Jesus would come around or by 2027.

He has also made claims in recent DVDs that the COVID-19 pandemic is one of the signs of the imminent coming of Christ - in line with his 2027 claim. This is not supported by the church he is a member of.

== Antisemitism accusation ==
In a lecture in Nürnberg-Marienberg in October 2012, Walter Veith claimed that the Holocaust was used by the Freemasons and Jesuits to "herd together" the Jews from all over Europe, so that they could be resettled in Palestine.

The leadership of the Seventh-day Adventist Church in Germany, Austria and Switzerland decided on 9 November 2012 that these statements were antisemitic and discriminatory. The church leaders took the view that they were "very close to criminal trivialization of the Nazi reign of terror". In December 2012, the Church leaders banned Veith from speaking in community centers and described his lectures as "conspiracy theories" and "spiritual abuse".

However, various of the German Seventh-day Adventist groups are getting around this ban by inviting Walter Veith into larger, independent event halls.

Amazing Discoveries and Walter Veith replied that the presentation was not meant to be antisemitic in any way, and they distanced themselves from antisemitism and racism. Veith blamed the accusation of anti-Semitism on "linguistic inadequacy", because German is a foreign language for him, adding that in Germany there is a "hypersensitivity" to statements about the persecution of the Jews. According to Amazing Discoveries, Arno Hamburger, a member of Nuremberg City Council and first chairman of the Jewish Religious Community, speaking for the local Jewish community, expressed the view that there was no recognizable antisemitism in Veith's statement.

== Books ==
- Something different. Vegan cookery. More great, tasty recipes. Nuremberg: Shosh, 1993
- Rediscover diet. The influence of diet on our health. Stuttgart: Scientific Publishing Company, 1996 ISBN 3-8047-1468-4, (Also published as Diet and Health, Stuttgart 1998, ISBN 3-88763-068-8 ). Presents insights on health from his own research and seminars on nutrition and the impact of diet on human health and disease
- The Genesis Conflict. Amazing Discoveries, Delta BC 2002, ISBN 0-9682363-5-9. A study of evolutionary theory and the evidences of Creation found in the natural world. In this book Veith discusses the biblical version of the creation account and argues in support of its veracity, maintaining that the geological and paleontological data does not support gradual evolution, but rather imply catastrophism, which is consistent with the Genesis account.
- On the truth is what matters. Amazing Discoveries, Heroldsberg 2003, ISBN 3-9809109-0-3, (Original title: Truth Matters - Escaping the Labyrinth of Error). An analysis of current religious and political developments on the basis of biblical texts, claiming that the Papacy, Freemasonry, and the United Nations (among other institutions) are anti-Christian oriented organizations.

== Publications ==
1. Veith, W. J. 1974. Reproductive biology of Chamaeleo pumilis pumilis with special reference to the role of the corpus luteum and progesterone. Zool. Afr. 9: 161–183.
2. Veith, W. J. 1979 The Chemical composition of the follicular fluid of the viviparous teleost Clinus Superciliousus, Comp. Biochem. Physiol. 63A; 37–40
3. Veith, W. J., 1979, Reproduction of the live-bearing teleost Clinus Superciliosus. S. Afr. J. Zool. 14:208-211
4. Veith, W. J., 1980, Viviparity and embryonic adaptions in the teleost Clinus Superciliosus. Can J. Zool. 58:1-12
5. Veith, W. J. and S. R. Malecha. 1983. Histochemical study of the distribution of lipids, 3 alpha- and 3 beta-hydrosteroid dehydrogenase in the androgenic gland of the cultured prawn, Macrobrachium rosenbergii (de Man) (Crustacea; Decapoda). S. Afri. J. Sci. 79:84-85.
6. Manie, T., Khan, S., Brozel, V.S., Veith, W.J. and Gouws, P.A. 1998. Antimicrobial resistance of bacteria isolated from slaughtered and retail chicken in South Africa. Letters in Applied Microbiology 26, 253–258.
7. Manie, T., Brozel, V.S., Veith, W.J. and Gouws, P.A. 1999. Antimicrobial resistance of bacterial flora associated with bovine products in South Africa. Journal of Food Protection 62, 615–618.

== See also ==
- Teachings of Ellen White § End times
- Inspiration of Ellen White
- Prophecy in the Seventh-day Adventist Church
- Investigative judgment
- Pillars
- Conditional Immortality
- Historicism
- Creation and evolution in public education
- Three Angels' Messages
- Inspiration of Ellen White
- Our Authorized Bible Vindicated
- King-James-Only Movement
- Bible version debate
- David Otis Fuller
- Revised Version
- Leonard R. Brand
- Flood geology
- Conspiracy theory
