= Jupiter-puer =

Ancient Roman cult statue

According to Cicero (On Divination, 2.41.85), the cult statue Jupiter-puer ("Jupiter, the Boy") stood directly adjacent to the site where the sacred lots of ancient Praeneste were first discovered inside a flint rock. This statue, which existed in Cicero's time, showed an infant Jupiter sitting with Juno in the lap of the goddess Fortuna, reaching for her breast.

Italian archaeologist Filippo Coarelli has identified an engraving of the third-century BC that shows a boy sitting in a cave, handing a rectangular object to a hand reaching down, as a depiction of this Jupiter-puer.

Alexander Hislop's book The Two Babylons, described Jupiter-puer as a boy-saviour deity worshipped in ancient Rome. Hislop writes that he was depicted as sitting on his mother's lap, supposedly inspiring the image of the Virgin Mary and her son, Jesus, in Roman Catholicism.
