= Lord Mackay =

Lord Mackay may refer to 2 Scottish judges:

- Donald Mackay, Baron Mackay of Drumadoon (1946–2018)
- James Mackay, Baron Mackay of Clashfern (1927–2026)

== See also ==
- Lord Reay
- John MacKay, Baron MacKay of Ardbrecknish
- Ronald Mackay, Lord Eassie
