= Mary W. M. Falconer =

19th-century Scottish poet

- Born: 1867; Duns, Berwickshire
- Died: 1944 (aged 76–77)
- Education: University of Edinburgh; University of St Andrews
- Occupations: Writer; Poet; Teacher
- Relatives: Agnes S. Falconer (sister)

Mary W. M. Falconer (1867-1944) was a Scottish writer, poet, governess and teacher. She grew up with her sister Agnes S. Falconer, also Scottish writer and poet, in Duns, Berwickshire, Scotland. Along with her sister, Mary contributed a range of poetry and short fictional pieces to Scottish and English periodicals and newspapers. She used a combination of her initials to sign her poems. The Falconer sisters' scrapbooks are housed by the Scottish Borders Archive and Local History Centre in Hawick.

== Early life and education ==
Mary W. M. Falconer was born in 1867 to Allan Falconer, ironmonger and merchant, and grew up with her younger sister Agnes. Her uncle, James Swan, was a stationer, bookseller and printer in Duns. The two sisters had a comfortable middle-class upbringing, and the family kept a servant and sometimes a lodger in the house. Mary attended Duns Public School, before enrolling at Miss Lithgow's Academy in Duns, and then at Miss Crawford's Young Ladies College, Edinburgh, where she studied Latin, Arithmetic, English, History and Geography. In 1883 she gained a senior certificate with honours in English, History and Geography from the University of Edinburgh. She went on to earn the Government teacher's certificate in 1890 and in 1892, the L.L.A Diploma from the University of St Andrews in English, Comparative Philology, History and French. In 1893 she passed the L.L.A examination in Education and received a first class in German.

== Adulthood ==
Mary worked as a governess at Cumledge House in Duns from 1887, and was the governess to the sons of the minister of Edrom in 1889. From 1889 to 1892, she became assistant teacher at Swinton Public School, before going on to teach at Kinghorn Public School in Fife, and Bellevue House School in Yorkshire. She published poetry and short fictional pieces in the Scottish and English periodical press with her sister between 1880 and the early 1910s. Mary was a member of the Berwickshire Women's Liberal Association. In the early 1900s, it seems that Mary decided to split from the Women's Liberal Association, as she co-founded the Berwickshire branch of the Anti-Suffarage League in 1909, and served as their first secretary. An unfinished manuscript novel has been found, authored by Mary, under the title Cousins.
