= Alexander Wilson (photographer) =

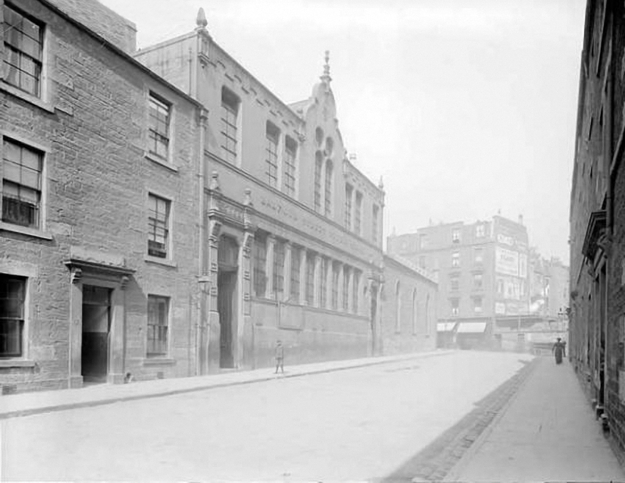
Balfour Street Public School, Dundee

Alexander Wilson (born in Duns, Berwickshire, Scotland; died 1922) was a noted amateur photographer who worked as supervisor in a Dundee jute mill for over 20 years.

Wilson moved to Dundee in his twenties to become calendar manager in the Baltic Street Calendar of Baxter Brothers of Dundee. For over 30 years, he devoted his spare time to photography. He was particularly interested in architecture. He took black and white photographs of buildings in Dundee from the 1870s to 1905. It was fortunate that he was active at this time, because subsequent redevelopment work in Dundee resulted in some buildings of the City vanishing forever.

Before his death in 1922 he bequeathed the majority of his 5,000 glass negatives to the Free Library Committee of the Town Council, with the sum of £50 to assist with the cost of conservation.

His photographic collection was donated to Dundee Free Library in 1923.
