= Battle of Duns =

1372 action between England and Scotland

- Part of the Anglo-Scottish Wars
Date	1372
Location	Duns, Berwickshire, Scotland 55.770°N 2.352°W
Result	Scottish victory

Belligerents
Kingdom of Scotland	Kingdom of England

Commanders and leaders
	Henry Percy, 4th Baron Percy

Strength
Thousands	7,000

The Battle of Duns or Battle of Duns Park was an engagement fought in 1372 near the site of the present day town of Duns, Berwickshire.

== Background and battle ==
In retaliation for previous Scottish raids, Henry, Lord Percy, the English March Warden had invaded Scotland with 7,000 troops, and met little resistance. Having crossed the Merse, the English army camped at Duns awaiting reinforcements. The shepherds and farmers of Duns used a type of rattle out of dried skins with pebbles inside, which they used to scare wild animals away from their crops and beasts. These rattles were put to effect on the English encampment. By frightening the English horses, the English camp awoke in turmoil, in disarray and being harassed by the local peasantry, the English retired over the Border leaving their baggage behind.

The motto of the town of Duns: 'Duns dings a'!', is supposed to have come from this battle.
