= Berwickshire High School =

Secondary school in Scotland

Coordinates: 55.7733°N 2.3564°W

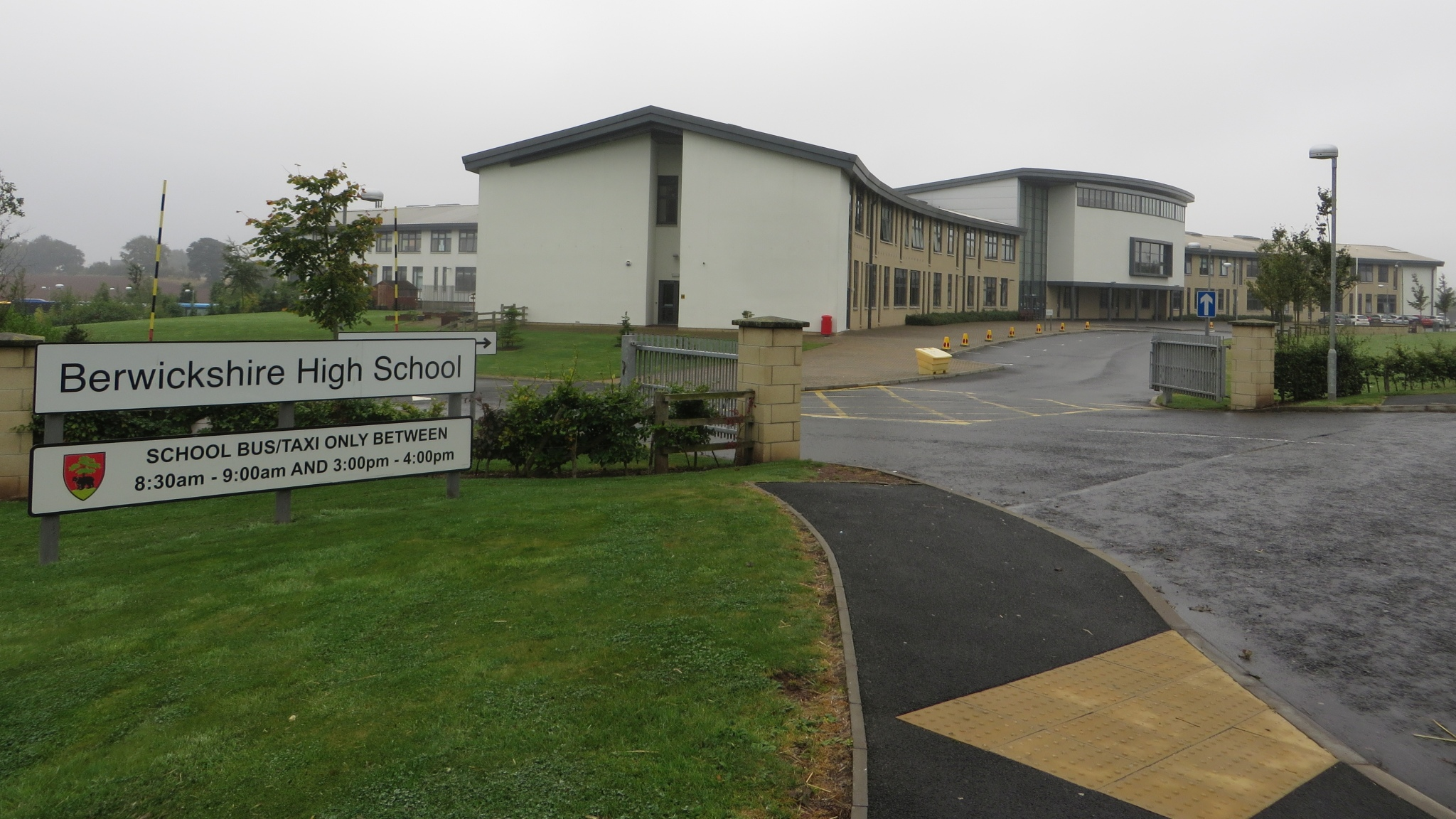
- Duns, Berwickshire

Information
- Established: 1896

Berwickshire High School is a six-year comprehensive school located west of Duns, Scotland.

== History ==
It was first opened in 1896, by Walter John Mabbott, who was the first Rector of the school. It started out with accommodation for 80 pupils in which extensions were built on to accommodate the rise in pupil numbers.

By the 1950s the school had become very overcrowded so plans were made to create a new school. The new school opened in 1958.

The school has a large catchment area stretching all over Berwickshire including Duns, Greenlaw, Chirnside, Coldstream, Foulden, Paxton, Eccles, Leitholm, Allanton and Swinton.

When the school was established the motto from the poem "Ulysses", "To Strive, To Seek, To Find and not to Yield", meaning to make the most of your life. It has recently changed to 'Aim for best' in an attempt to encourage students to set their goals as high as possible.

== House system ==
The school has three 'houses' into which the pupils are split. This is not only a way to organise classes but is also intended to encourage a rivalry, being the basis of inter-house competitive events. The houses are named after notable people from Berwickshire. The three houses are Scott, Home and Douglas. Each has its own colour, Head of House (Staff), House Captains and Vice Captains (derived from pupils in S5/S6) and House Representatives. Each earn points throughout the year, at the end of which the house with the most points wins the Interhouse trophy.

== Change of buildings ==
The new high school was officially opened in February 2009. Work started in October 2006 on the new school which is located opposite the old building. The design was similar to Eyemouth High School and Earlston High School which were all built at the same time under a Public Private Partnership with the Scottish Borders Council.

== Notable former pupils ==
- Daniel Blades, Lord Blades, Senator of the College of Justice
- Harald Leslie, Lord Birsay, Judge
- Ronald Mackay, Lord Eassie, Judge
- Helen Lowe, One of the first women chartered accountants in Scotland.
