= Ralph Woodrow =

Christian evangelist (born 1939)

Ralph Edward Woodrow (born 1939) is an Evangelical Christian minister, speaker and presently the author of sixteen books. Woodrow formerly supported the thesis of 19th century Presbyterian minister, Alexander Hislop, that Roman Catholicism is a syncretistic pagan religion in his book Babylon Mystery Religion and gained a certain notoriety when he changed his view and pulled the work from circulation. His new viewpoint is documented in The Babylon Connection?.

Woodrow has been in the ministry since the age of 18, where he has remained for over fifty years.

== Bibliography ==
- Babylon Mystery Religion: Ancient and Modern (1966)
- Great Prophecies of the Bible (1971)
- Women's Adornment: What Does the Bible Really Say? (1976)
- His Truth is Marching On: Advanced Studies on Prophecy in Light of History (1977)
- Amazing Discoveries Within the Book of Books (1979)
- Noah's Flood, Joshua's Long Day, and Lucifer's Fall: What Really Happened? (1984)
- The Secret Rapture (1989)
- Dealing With Demons: Total Victory in Chr theist (1990)
- Three Days and Three Nights Reconsidered (1993)
- Christmas Reconsidered (1994)
- Triumph Under Tragedy (1996)
- Easter: Is it pagan (1996)
- The Babylon Connection (1997)
- Reckless Rumors, Misinformation, Doomsday Delusions (2000)
- Divorce and Remarriage: What Does the Bible Really Say? (2002)
- In the World, Not of the World (2004)
- A Balanced Christian Discerns Extremes (2005)
