= Ronald Mackay, Lord Eassie =

Scottish lawyer and judge

The Right Honourable Lord Eassie
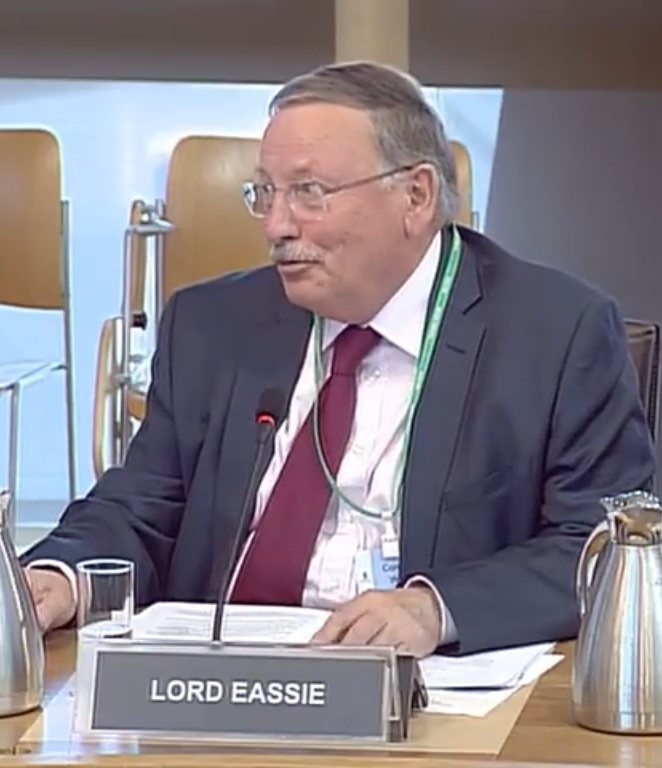
- Eassie in 2018

Senator of the College of Justice
- In office 1997–2015

Personal details
- Born: 1945 (age 80–81)
- Education: University of St Andrews, University of Edinburgh
- Profession: Advocate

Ronald David Mackay, Lord Eassie, PC (born 1945) is a Scottish lawyer and retired judge of the country's Supreme Courts, sitting in the Inner House of the Court of Session.

== Education ==
Mackay was educated at Berwickshire High School in Duns, Scotland, and studied at the University of St Andrews (M.A. Hons.) and the School of Law of the University of Edinburgh (LL.B.).

== Career ==
Mackay was admitted to the Faculty of Advocates (the Scottish Bar) in 1972. From 1979 to 1982, he worked in Luxembourg for the Court of Justice of the European Communities. Mackay was appointed Queen's Counsel in 1986, serving as a prosecutor in the Crown Office and Procurator Fiscal Service until 1990.

In 1997, Mackay was appointed a Senator of the College of Justice and assumed the judicial title of Lord Eassie. On 15 July 2002 Lord Eassie succeeded Lord Gill as chairman of the Scottish Law Commission. He was a reappointed to a second three-year term in August 2005.

Lord Eassie resigned his position on the Law Commission in order to serve on the Inner House of the Court of Session. He was appointed to the Privy Council on 19 October 2006. He retired from the bench in 2015, and in 2016 became a trustee of the Carnegie Trust for the Universities of Scotland.

=== Selected publications ===
- Discussion paper on rape and other sexual Offences, Scottish Law Commission Discussion Paper, Stationery Office, ISBN 0108881806
- Discussion Paper On Land Registration Void And Voidable Titles, Scottish Law Commission Discussion Paper, Stationery Office, 16 February 2004, ISBN 0-10-888132-6
- Report On Registration Of Rights In Security By Companies, Scottish Law Commission Report #197, Stationery Office, September 8, 2004, ISBN 0-10-292629-8

== Personal life ==
In 1988, he married Annette Frenkel, with whom he has one son, Colin. He is a member of the New Club.
