= The Two Babylons =

Book by Alexander Hislop

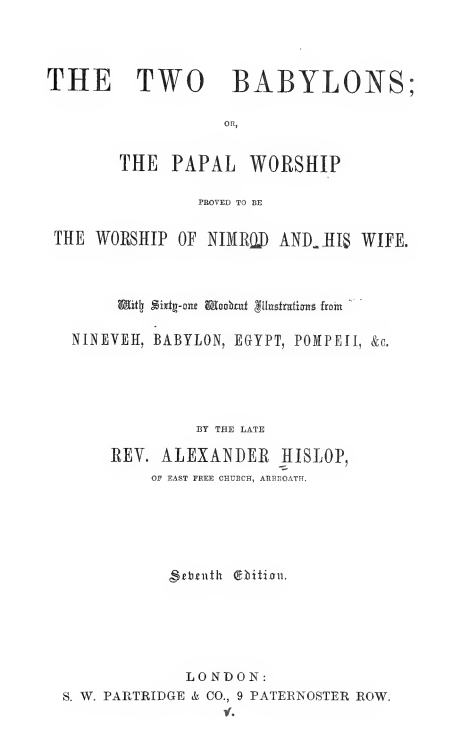
- Title page of the 7th edition (1871)
- Author: Alexander Hislop
- Publication date: 1853

The Two Babylons, subtitled Romanism and its Origins, is a book that started out as a religious pamphlet published in 1853 by the Presbyterian Free Church of Scotland theologian Alexander Hislop (1807–1865).

Its central theme is the argument that the Catholic Church is the Babylon of the Apocalypse which is described in the Bible. The book delves into the symbolism of the image which is described in the Book of Revelation – the woman with the golden cup – and it also attempts to prove that many of the fundamental practices of the Church of Rome, and its Modus Operandi in general, stem from non-scriptural precedents. It analyzes modern Catholic holidays, including Christmas and Easter, and attempts to trace their roots back to pagan festivals. It also attempts to show that many other accepted doctrines (such as Jesus' crucifixion on a Cross) may not be correct. Hislop provides a detailed comparison of the ancient religion which was established in Babylon (allegedly by the Biblical king Nimrod and his wife, Semiramis) by drawing on a variety of historical and religious sources, in order to show that the modern Papacy and the Catholic Church are the same system as the Babylon that was mentioned by the apostle Paul in the first century (when he commented on the iniquity that was already creeping into the 1st century Christian church) and the author of Revelation. Some modern scholars have rejected the book's arguments as erroneous and based on a flawed understanding of the Babylonian religion, but variations of them are accepted among some groups of evangelical Protestants.

== Publication history ==
The book was expanded in 1858, going through many editions. A 3rd edition was published in 1862, a 7th in 1871, (thus, a mere six years after the author's death, four successive posthumous editions had already appeared), and a popular edition in 1903.

== Description ==
Hislop builds on the Panbabylonian school of Hyperdiffusionism, which was common in the 19th century, to argue that Classical and Ancient Near Eastern civilization took its inspiration from Babylon. From this he derives the argument that the mystery religions of Late Antiquity were actually offshoots of one ancient religion founded at the Tower of Babel. Panbabylonism has since been relegated to pseudohistory by 20th-century scholars.

Much of Hislop's work centers on his association of the legendary Ninus and his semi-historical wife Semiramis with the Biblical Nimrod as her husband and her son, with their incestuous male offspring being Tammuz. Hellenistic histories of the Ancient Near East tended to conflate their faint recollections of the deeds of ancient kings into legendary figures who exerted far more power than any ancient king ever did. In Assyria, they invented an eponymous founder of Nineveh named Ninus, who supposedly ruled 52 years over an empire comparable to the Persian Empire at its greatest extent. Ninus' wife Semiramis was in turn a corruption of the historical figure Shammuramat, regent of the Neo-Assyrian Empire from 811 BC. Hislop takes Ninus as a historical figure and associates him with the Biblical figure Nimrod, though he was not the first to do so. The Clementine literature made the association in the 4th century AD. An influential belief throughout the Middle Ages was that Ninus was the inventor of idolatry, a concept that Hislop clearly drew upon. However, Hislop wrote before the historical records of the ancient near east had been thoroughly decoded and studied, that cast doubt in the decades after he wrote whether there was any such figure as Ninus, and the Greek authors whom he quoted lacked credibility on the subject.

The Two Babylons heavily relies on Austen Henry Layard's publications of his excavations at Nineveh, which had only been just discovered in 1851. This gave his work an appearance of being well-researched at the time of its publication. For example, Hislop linked the name of Easter with Astarte, the Phoenician fertility goddess by citing Layard's recent discovery of Astarte's Assyrian name, Ishtar, which Hislop took to be "identical" to Easter.

What means the term Easter itself? It is not a Christian name. It bears its Chaldean origin on its very forehead. Easter is nothing else than Astarte, one of the titles of Beltis, the queen of heaven, whose name, as pronounced by the people Nineveh, was evidently identical with that now in common use in this country. That name, as found by Layard on the Assyrian monuments, is Ishtar.

— Hislop, The Two Babylons, Chapter 3, Section 2, Easter

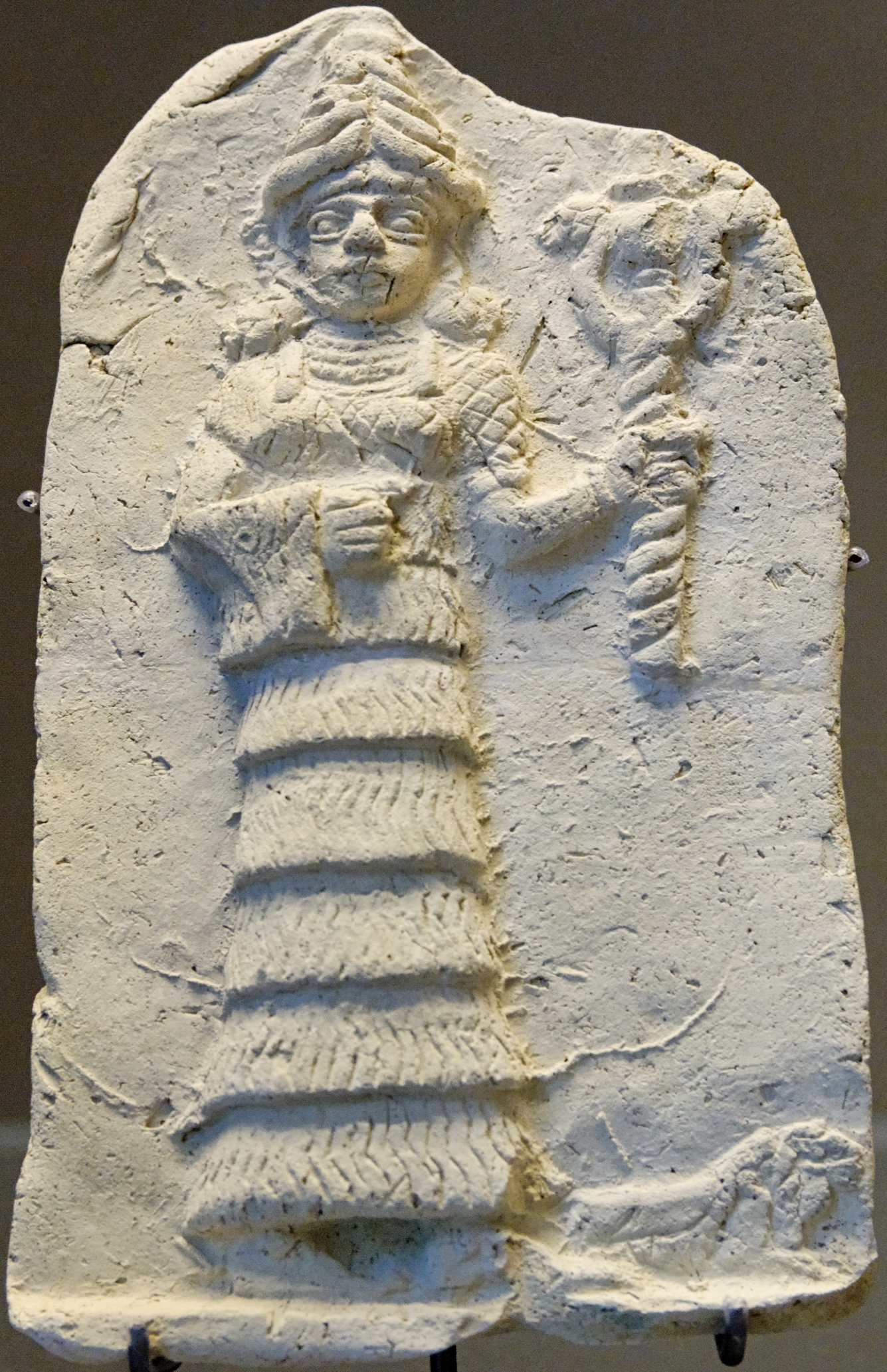
Relief of the Babylonian goddess Ishtar, whose name Hislop incorrectly claimed to be the root behind the English word Easter

Hislop's claim that Easter is derived from Ishtar is rejected by historical linguists and is an example of folk etymology. Philologists derive the word Easter from Old English Ēostre, the name of a West Germanic goddess. Ēostre derives from the Proto-Germanic goddess name *austrōn-, whose name in turn derives from the Proto-Indo-European deity and personified dawn Hausos (from the Proto-Indo-European root *aus-, meaning 'to shine' and thus 'dawn, east'). Other dawn goddesses who developed from *h₂ewsṓs include Latin Aurora, Ancient Greek Eos, and Vedic Sanskrit Ushas. Ishtar, however, is unrelated. Ishtar is a Semitic name of uncertain etymology, possibly taken from the same root as Assyria, or from a semitic word meaning "to irrigate".

Hislop ultimately claimed to trace Catholic doctrines back to the worship of Nimrod, asserting that the Catholic Church represented Whore of Babylon of the Book of Revelation and that "the Pope himself is truly and properly the lineal representative of Belshazzar." He claimed that the Christogram IHS, the first three Greek letters in the name of Jesus, represented Latin characters standing for Isis, Horus and Seb.

== Analysis ==
In the note by the editor of the 7th edition, which was published in 1871, it was claimed, "that no one, so far as we are aware, has ventured to challenge the accuracy of the historical proofs adduced in support of the startling announcement on the title page." Since then, however, there have been many who have challenged the accuracy of Hislop's claims. For example, Lester L. Grabbe has highlighted the fact that Hislop's entire argument, particularly his association of Ninus with Nimrod, is based on a misunderstanding of historical Babylon and its religion. Grabbe also criticizes Hislop for portraying the mythological queen Semiramis as Nimrod's consort, despite the fact that she is never even mentioned in a single text associated with him, and for portraying her as the "mother of harlots", even though this is not how she is depicted in any of the texts where she is mentioned.

In 2011, a critical edition was published. Although Hislop's work is extensively footnoted, some commentators (in particular Ralph Woodrow) have made the assertion that the document contains numerous misconceptions, fabrications, logical fallacies, unsubstantiated conspiracy theories, and grave factual errors.

== Influence ==
Some fundamentalist Protestants still regard Hislop's book as proof that the Roman Catholic Church is, in fact, the continuation of the ancient Babylonian religion. In 1921 A. W. Pink confidently asserted that Hislop's work had "proven conclusively that all the idolatrous systems of the nations had their origin in what was founded by that mighty Rebel, the beginning of whose kingdom was Babel." Jehovah's Witnesses' periodical The Watchtower frequently published excerpts from it until the 1980s. The book's thesis has also featured prominently in the conspiracy theories of racist groups such as The Covenant, The Sword, and the Arm of the Lord and other fringe groups. Anti-Catholic Evangelical publisher Jack Chick endorsed the book, and his store still offers it. A number of Seventh-day Adventists still use The Two Babylons as source material. An example is the somewhat controversial Walter Veith, who still use the conclusions from Hislop's book to support his articles published at the website "Amazing Discoveries". Adventist magazine Spectrum, however, dismisses Veith as a conspiracy theorist.

As well, various viral image posts have appeared on the internet, usually in neopagan or atheist spaces, citing Hislop's theory of Easter being etymologically derived from Ishtar, as well as adding in more misleading pieces such as claiming Ishtar's symbols were the "bunny" and the "egg". This view has been echoed by the Richard Dawkins Foundation for Reason and Science, who has since retracted the claim.

== See also ==
- Anti-Catholicism
- Christianity and Paganism
- List of conspiracy theories
- Loraine Boettner
