= Walter Hume Kerr =

British archaeologist

Walter Hume Kerr FSA Scot FRSE (25 June 1861 – 9 August 1936) was a Scottish engineer, antiquary and amateur archaeologist.

== Early life ==
He was born on in Duns, Berwickshire, on 25 June 1861. He was the second son of Rev Daniel Kerr of the South United Presbyterian Church in the town. He was educated at the Wellfield Academy in the town. He went to the University of Edinburgh graduating with an MA in 1882. He later retrained in engineering, and gained a further BSc in 1893. He then began as an Assistant Lecturer in engineering at the university.

== Career ==
In 1913 he was elected a Fellow of the Royal Society of Edinburgh. His proposers were Sir Thomas Hudson Beare, James Geikie, William Turner, and William Archer Tait. In the First World War he was Sub-Director of the Army Education Unit for all France. He served as Education Officer for the Rhine Area 1918–19.

== Death ==
He died on 9 August 1936 while visiting a friend at Glenfriars in Jedburgh.
