= Leonard R. Brand =

American scientist

- Born: Leonard Roy Brand; 1941 (age 84–85); Harvey, North Dakota, U.S.
- Education: Loma Linda University (MA); Cornell University (PhD)
- Occupations: Professor of biology and paleontology
- Employer: Loma Linda University
- Known for: Combination of paleobiology research and creationism; advocacy for courtesy in dialogue and for caution in making scientific claims.
- Children: 2
- Website: http://resweb.llu.edu/lbrand/index.html

Leonard Brand (born 1941) is an American biologist, paleontologist, and Seventh-day Adventist creationist. He is a professor and past chair of Loma Linda University Department of Earth and Biological Sciences. Brand's most widely debated research was regarding fossil tracks at the Grand Canyon.

As a Creationist, he teaches interventionism, a view of history that holds that there is intelligent intervention in history. His desire for respectful dialogue has been welcomed by advocates on both sides of the creation–evolution controversy. He challenges his fellow creationists to use caution when making scientific claims.

== Scientific research ==
Brand received a Ph.D. in biology from Cornell University in 1970, having also received a Master of Arts at Loma Linda University in 1966. He began his scientific career in the study of small mammals. In 1968, Brand and Raymond Ryckman studied the systematics of deer mice (specifically the mainland cactus mouse and two related species isolated to nearby islands, the San Lorenzo and Angel Island mice. This was also the topic of Brand's masters. They confirmed the accepted taxonomy of these species, and showed that these species are still able to interbreed.

Starting in 1970, Brand reported on the tree nests and vocalisations of California chipmunks. This was also his PhD topic. Along with many other scientists, his reported methodologies and observations have added to the accumulating scientific knowledge of these mammals.

From 1999, the fossil remains of hundreds of whales (including the "Leviathan") were discovered as part of the Pisco formation in Peru. Brand and his associates studied the taphonomy of these well-articulated skeletons, and concluded that the burial of the whales in diatom sediment had been a very rapid event.

In 2000, Brand et al. have conducted field research on fossil turtles in the Bridger Formation of Wyoming. He has also been involved in taphonomy experiments using modern animal carcasses, particularly intended to aid understanding of the features of fossil turtles.

In the field of ichnology, Brand, along with Thu Tang, Andrew A. Snelling, and Steven Austin has proposed that fossil tracks in the Grand Canyon's Coconino Sandstone point to underwater deposition, rather than desert wind deposition of dry sand. Brand and Tang studied western newts walking on sand under 4 cm of flowing water in an aquarium tank. By analogy, they concluded that at least part of the Coconino Sandstone was deposited under water. This hypothesis has been criticized by geologists who interpret evidence supporting sub-aerial formation.

Geologist Martin Lockley describes Brand's Salamander trackway study as "seriously flawed" and notes that Brand links the underwater tracks theory to the idea that the Grand Canyon was formed entirely by a catastrophic, biblical-style flood, a view which Lockley calls geologically naive and disingenuous. He criticizes Brand's book Faith, Reason and Earth History for "leaving out any discussion of the objections published by geologists to his interpretation." Lockley does, however, commend Brand for admitting that creationists have made mistakes and that science-bashing can be counter-productive, for advocating respectful engagement, and for raising thought-provoking philosophical questions regarding evolution and sociobiology.

A number of studies have found evidence contradicting Brand and Tang's conclusions and Lockley and Hunt's 1995 book Dinosaur Tracks and Other Fossil Footprints of the Western United States suggests an alternative explanation with the tracks being made in air by extinct mammal-like reptiles called caseids. Inconsistencies that contradict the underwater hypothesis include:

- tracks demonstrating various running gaits impossible under water, at various angles to the slope;
- tracks made by many forms of invertebrates which would not leave prolific underwater tracks, including some which could only be made on completely dry sand; and
- raindrop impressions.

Apart from the controversy, his observations of underwater foot prints have been cited in peer-reviewed journals.

In his report on laboratory controlled simulations of dinosaur footprints in sand, Simon J. Jackson cites eight scientists, including Brand. He says,

Experimental studies with live animals have greatly contributed to our understanding of track formation and preservation. Several authors (e.g., Padian and Olsen, 1989; Farlow, 1989; Farlow and Pianka, 2000) have focused on how the gait and behavior of the trackmaker affects the resultant track and trackway morphology. Other studies (e.g., McKee, 1947; Brand, 1979, 1996; Gatesy et al., 1999; Milan 2006) have investigated how a range of media conditions, such as the moisture (i.e., water) content, interacts with the movement of the foot to produce a spectrum of footprints.

Brand has also been involved in research not published in mainstream scientific journals. In 1970 Berney Neufeld, Brand and Art Chadwick studied the controversial Paluxy tracks and, contrary to many creationists at that time, concluded that those tracks did not provide valid evidence for the coexistence of humans and dinosaurs.

== Creationism ==
On November 9, 1972, the California State Board of Education held hearings to examine creation science. Leonard Brand, along with Loma Linda University colleague Ariel Roth, made presentations. Brand contended that creationist views are misunderstood in that creationists also believe in evolution of species within the major groups of plants and animals. The evidence for this was very good, he said. They "have no argument with experimental evidence." In conclusion, he stated that students in California schools should be allowed to hear both theories and form their own conclusions.

Leonard Brand has authored two books on the creation–evolution controversy, Faith, Reason and Earth History (1997, 2nd Ed. 2009) and Beginnings (2007). Both are published in English and Spanish, and the former is also published in Portuguese.

Ichnologist Martin Lockley wrote a critical review of FREH, accusing Brand of unscrupulousness and ignorance. He said the book "shows us, on the one hand, a very curious mix of what appear to be a few genuine attempts, by creationists, to do good science, or at least better science than they have done in the past, and, on the other hand, what appear to be quite ridiculous and extraordinarily naive interpretations of classic geological localities such as the Grand Canyon."

Young Earth Creationists include Leonard Brand among their leaders. They often cite his field and lab research as evidence for the biblical flood. Marcus R. Ross of Liberty University includes Brand's Faith, Reason and Earth's History in a short list of "well-researched YEC writings on geology." These "excellent sources" include Steven Austin, Kurt Wise, Leonard Brand and Andrew A. Snelling. In August, 2008, Brand gave the keynote address at the Seventh Creation Biology Study Groups Conference entitled “Origins Research: A Better Worldview Yields Better Research Questions.”

Brand participates in the creation–evolution controversy less confrontationally than many creationists. Young and Stearley, two Christian geologists who disagree with Brand's young earth views, state that he, along with Ariel Roth and some other recent flood geology advocates "have a much more irenic and moderate tone that provides a welcome contrast to the sarcastic, sometimes disrespectful tone and unwarrantedly dogmatic pronouncements of earlier creationists." In a foreword to Brand's book Faith, Reason and Earth History Kurt Wise applauds the book for breaking free from the "science-bashing spirit" prevalent in creationist literature. Lockley suggests that Brand is "writing for people of faith" and that his more sympathetic approach may have a greater impact in "educat[ing] creationists to a scientific way of thinking" than the more confrontational approach of many anti-creationists.

Brand argues for integrity in creationist arguments, against using material that has many errors and writing "without having the scientific training to match their zeal."

In his PhD dissertation, Thomas McIver reports that:

Zoologist Leonard Brand used live reptiles and amphibians in his lab to see how footprints were formed in different conditions: dry, damp, and wet sand, and when the animals were walking on sand underwater. The underwater tracks, he concludes, resembles most closely fossil tracks such as found in the Grand Canyon’s Coconino Sandstone. This contradicts the evolutionist assumption of the desert origin of the sandstone, and supports the Flood model. Brand has published these experiments both in GRI’s journal Origins (1978) as well as a standard scientific journal (1979).

Brand distinguishes between scientific data and presuppositions:

The difference between a creationist and an evolutionist isn't a difference in the scientific data, but a difference in philosophy – a difference in the presuppositions...

Brand teaches that his biblical views help him propose questions for research. On page 8 of the book Beginnings, he states,

In my approach, I retain the scientific method of observation and experimentation, but I also allow study of Scripture to open my eyes to things that I might otherwise overlook and to suggest new hypotheses to test. This approach is not just a theory; some of us have been using it for years with success.

== Seventh-day Adventist church ==
The Seventh-day Adventist Church has recognized Brand as a thought leader in matters of science and origins since the early 1970s. He has served on the SDA church's science council from 1976 to 2003. He oversaw the development of the church's earth sciences program at Loma Linda University. He has taught science methodology in regional church conference and has explained creationist concepts to students in public colleges.

In the area of doctrinal apologetics, Brand has published a book in response to the major critics of church founder Ellen G. White.

In 1978, church leaders approved Loma Linda University's Department of Biology masters program in earth history. As head of the department, Brand explained the rationale for the program,

Our objectives for the degree are two-fold. We want to train secondary teachers to teach earth history and to foster study in the earth sciences in the context of the various ideas of origins." He said that Adventists had neglected the fields of paleontology and geology even though they related significantly to the church's understanding of origins. According to Brand, it was important for the Adventist church to have teachers on all levels who could understand the conflict in these areas.

== The prophet and her critics ==
In 2005, Don S. McMahon, an Australian medical specialist, and Leonard Brand co-authored the book The prophet and her critics. It was published by the Pacific Press Publishing Association. The core issue treated in their book is Ellen White's writings on health. In the first four chapters, Brand reports on the earlier research of Ron Numbers on health (1976), Jon Butler on prophetic fulfilment (1979) and Walter Rea on literary relationships (1982). He proposes that these earlier research studies should be examined for their use of logic, interpretation of data, and whether they had good research designs.

Numbers reports,

Brand collaborated with McMahon in bringing McMahon's finding to the attention of American Adventists... the latter book (Brand and McMahon's) devotes a chapter to exposing the perceived weaknesses of Prophetess of Health, especially its failure to entertain "the hypothesis of divine inspiration" (p. 44)

He criticises both of McMahon's books:

Despite their pretense to scientific rigor, McMahon's books are riddled with pseudoscientific claims, historical errors, and misleading comparisons.

== Publications ==
Thesis

- Brand, Leonard R. (1966). Biosystematics and Life histories of the Peromyscus guardia group of mice and Peromyscus eremicus (Rodentia: Cricetidae) (Masters thesis). Loma Linda University. OCLC 7949938.
- Brand, Leonard Roy (1970). Vocalizations and behavior of the chipmunks (genus Eutamias) in California (PhD thesis). Ithaca, N.Y.: Cornell University. OCLC 63334494.

Books

- Brand, Leonard R (1997). Faith, Reason, and Earth History: A Paradigm of Earth and Biological Origins by Intelligent Design. Andrews Univ. Press. ISBN 978-1-883925-15-4. OCLC 260088744.
- Esperante, R.; Brand, L.; Chadwick, A.; Poma, O. (2002). "Taphonomy of fossil whales in the diatomaceous sediments of the Miocene/Pliocene Pisco Formation, Peru." (PDF). In De Renzi, M.; Alonso, M.; Belinchon, M.; Penalver, E.; Montoya, P.; Marquez-Aliaga, A. (eds.). Current Topics on Taphonomy and Fossilization. 3rd Meeting on Taphonomy and Fossilization. Valencia, Spain.: International Conference Taphos. pp. 337–343.

Journals

- Brand, Leonard R.; Ryckman, Raymond E. (August 1968). "Laboratory Life Histories of Peromyscus eremicus and Peromyscus interparietalis". Journal of Mammalogy. 49 (3): 495–501. doi:10.2307/1378208. JSTOR 1378208. PMID 5670808.
- Brand, Leonard R.; Ryckman, Raymond E. (August 1969). "Biosystematics of Peromyscus eremicus, P. guardia, and P. interparietalis". Journal of Mammalogy. 50 (3): 501–513. doi:10.2307/1378777. JSTOR 1378777.
- Brand, L. R. (1974). "Tree nests of California chipmunks (Eutamias)". American Midland Naturalist. 91 (2): 489–491. doi:10.2307/2424347. JSTOR 2424347.
- Brand, L. R. (1976). "The vocal repertoire of chipmunks (genus Eutamias) in California". Animal Behaviour. 24 (2): 319–335. doi:10.1016/S0003-3472(76)80040-1. S2CID 53192599.
- Brand, L. R. (1979). "Field and laboratory studies on the Coconino Sandstone (Permian) fossil vertebrate footprints and their paleoecological implications". Palaeogeography, Palaeoclimatology, Palaeoecology. 28: 25–38. doi:10.1016/0031-0182(79)90111-1. "(Reprinted in Benchmark Papers in Geology)"
- Blankenship, D. J.; Brand, L. R. (1987). "Geographic Variation in Vocalizations of California Chipmunks Tamias obscurus and T. merriami". Bulletin of the Southern California Academy of Sciences. 86 (3): 126–135. ISSN 0038-3872.
- Brand, L.R.; Tang, T. (1991). "Fossil vertebrate footprints in the Coconino Sandstone (Permian) of northern Arizona: Evidence for underwater origin". Geology. 19 (12): 1201–1204. Bibcode:1991Geo....19.1201B. doi:10.1130/0091-7613(1991)019<1201:FVFITC>2.3.CO;2.
- Brand, L. R. (1992). "Reply to comments on "fossil vertebrate footprints in the Coconino Sandstone (Permian) of northern Arizona: evidence for underwater origin."". Geology. 20 (7): 668–670. doi:10.1130/0091-7613(1992)020<0666:CAROFV>2.3.CO;2.
- Brand, L. R. (1996). "Variations in salamander trackways resulting from substrate differences". Journal of Paleontology. 70 (6): 1004–1010. Bibcode:1996JPal...70.1004B. doi:10.1017/S0022336000038701. S2CID 36191778.
- Brand, L.R.; Kramer, J. (1996). "Underprints of vertebrate and invertebrate trackways in the Permian Coconino Sandstone in Arizona". Ichnos. 4 (3): 225–230. doi:10.1080/10420949609380129.
- Brand, L. R.; Buchheim, H. P.; Goodwin, H. T.; Ambrose, P. G. (2000). "Taphonomy of turtles in the Middle Eocene Bridger Formation, SW Wyoming" (PDF). Palaeogeography, Palaeoclimatology, Palaeoecology. 162 (1–2): 171–189. Bibcode:2000PPP...162..171B. doi:10.1016/s0031-0182(00)00111-5.
- Buchheim, H. P.; Brand, L. R.; Goodwin, H. T. (2000). "Lacustrine to fluvial flood-plain deposition in the Eocene Bridger Formation". Palaeogeography, Palaeoclimatology, Palaeoecology. 162 (1–2): 191–209. Bibcode:2000PPP...162..191B. doi:10.1016/s0031-0182(00)00112-7.
- Brand, Leonard R.; Hussey, Michael; Taylor, John (2003). "Taphonomy of Freshwater Turtles: Decay and Disarticulation in Controlled Experiments" (PDF). Journal of Taphonomy. 1 (4): 233–245.
- Brand, L. R.; Esperante, R.; Chadwick, A. V.; Poma, O.; Alomia, M. (2004). "Fossil whale preservation implies high diatom accumulation rate in the Miocene-Pliocene Pisco Formation of Peru". Geology. 32 (2): 165–168. Bibcode:2004Geo....32..165B. doi:10.1130/g20079.1.

Presentations

- Roth, Ariel A.; Brand, Leonard R. (February 15, 1973). "The Truly Scientific Approach" (PDF). Review. 150 (7): 4, 5. (California State Board of Education hearing re: including creation as a theory of origins along with evolution.)
- Brand, Leonard (March 16–22, 2008). "Intelligent Design: Friend or Foe for Adventists?" (PDF). Institute for Christian Teaching. 4th Symposium on the Bible and Adventist Scholarship. Riviera Maya, Mexico: General Conference of Seventh-day Adventists Education Department. pp. 1–8.

== See also ==
- Creationism
- Flood geology
- Young Earth creationism
- Paleobiology
- Taphonomy
- Mammalogy
- Ichnology
- Martin Lockley
- Man Track Controversy
- Coconino Sandstone
- Seventh-day Adventist Church
- Seventh-day Adventist theology
- History of the Seventh-day Adventist Church
