= Duns Castle nature reserve =

Nature reserve in Scotland

Coordinates: 55.790°N 2.356°W

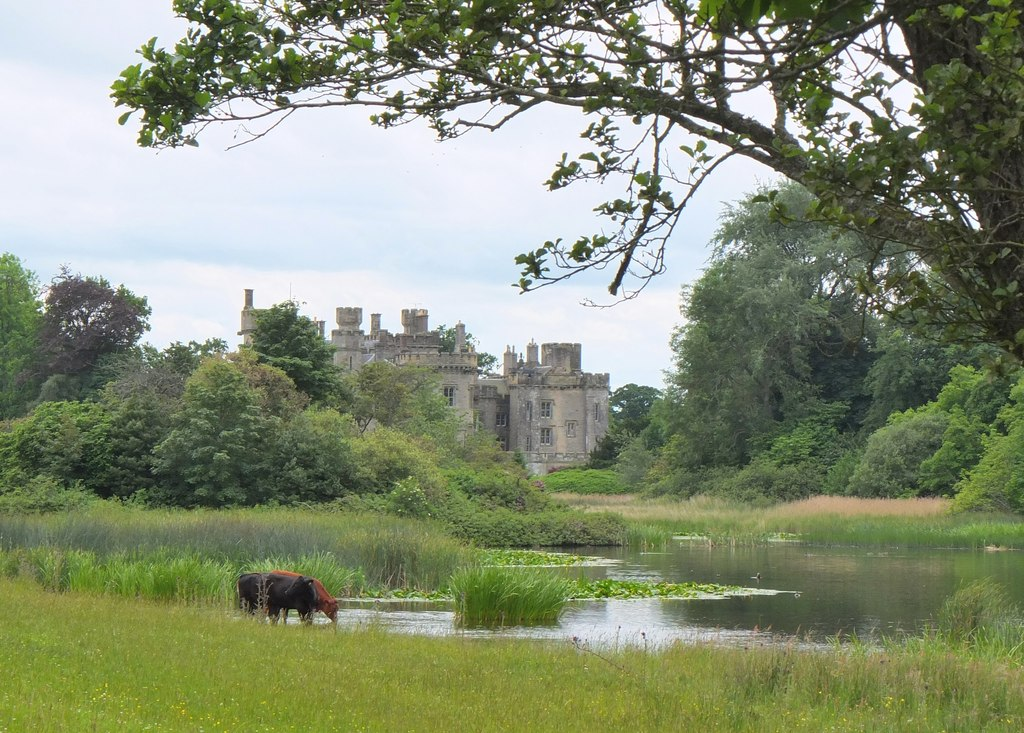
Hen Poo and Duns Castle

Duns Castle nature reserve is a nature reserve near Duns, in the Scottish Borders area of Scotland, in the former Berwickshire.

It consists of two man-made lakes, Hen Poo and Mill Dam; apart from the wetland, there are extensive woodland areas.

Places nearby include Abbey St Bathans, Chirnside, Ednam, Fogo, Gavinton, Polwarth, Preston.

== See also ==
- List of Sites of Special Scientific Interest in Berwickshire and Roxburgh (SSSI)
- List of places in the Scottish Borders
- List of places in Scotland
