= Walter Boardman Kerr =

American journalist and author (1911–2003)

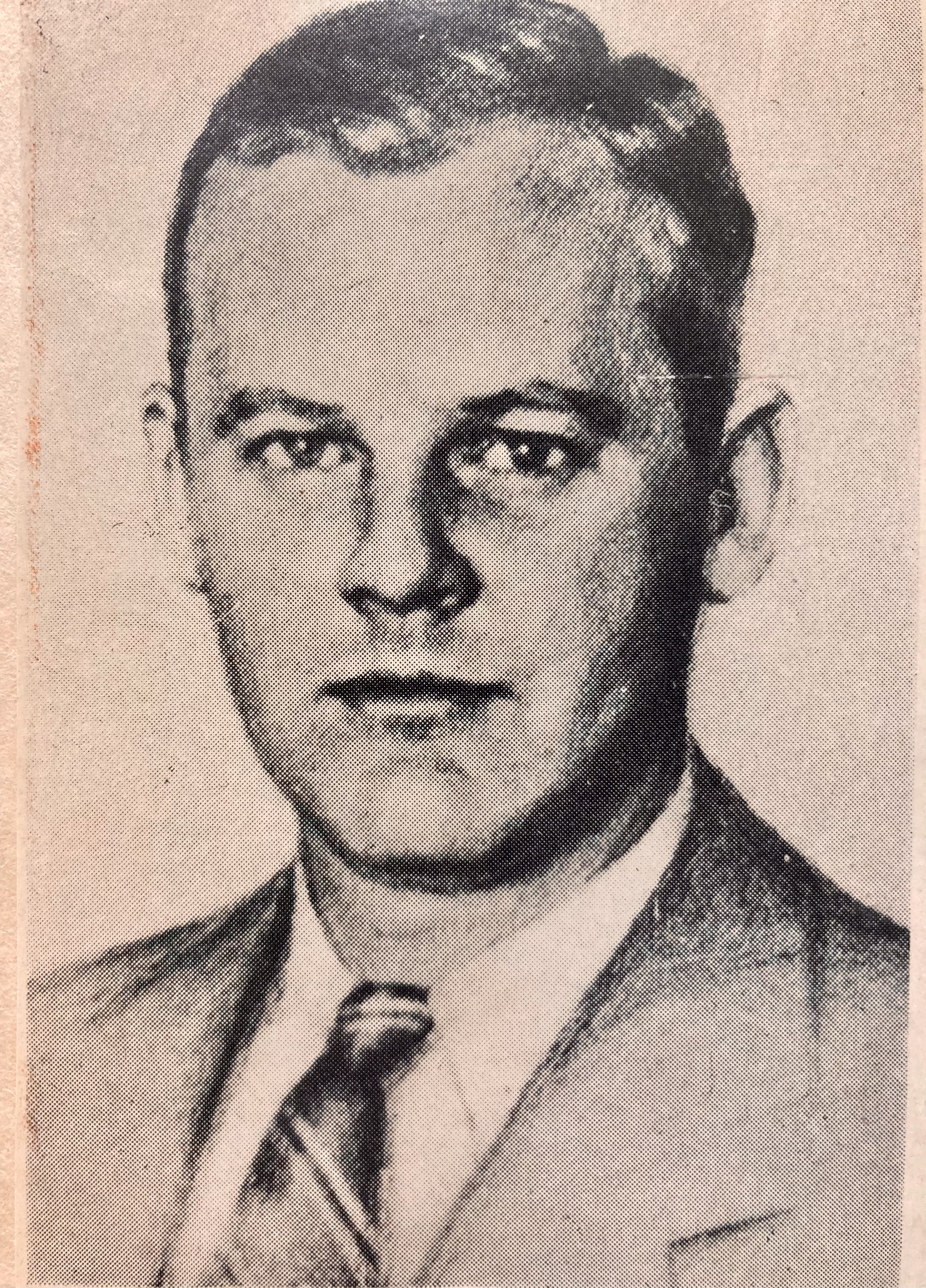
- Kerr in 1944 (family archive photo)
- Born: November 18, 1911; Syracuse, New York, U.S.
- Died: January 10, 2003 (aged 91); White Plains, New York
- Occupations: Journalist, publisher, book author
- Years active: 1932-1982
- Known for: Foreign correspondent for the New York Herald Tribune (1937-1956)
- Notable work: The Russian Army: Its Men, Its Leaders, and Its Battles (1944)

Walter Boardman Kerr (November 18, 1911 – January 10, 2003) was an American journalist, publisher and book author.

== Early life and education ==
Walter Boardman Kerr was born on November 18, 1911, in Syracuse, New York.

He entered Phillips Academy in Andover, Massachusetts in 1925, and finished the school in 1930. From 1930 until 1931, he studied at Yale University.

== Career as a journalist and author ==
Kerr started his career in journalism in 1932 at The Post-Standard and joined the New York Herald Tribune in 1934. He joined its European staff as a foreign correspondent in 1937. In 1938 Kerr was in Prague during the German occupation of Czechoslovakia, and in 1939 he was reporting from Finland, during the Winter War. In June 1940, he was in Paris, when the German army entered the city. Kerr had to move to Lisbon to send his censor-free report on the Paris occupation, which made it to the newspaper's front page. In 1940, he was appointed chief correspondent for South America, but a year later was dispatched to Europe again.

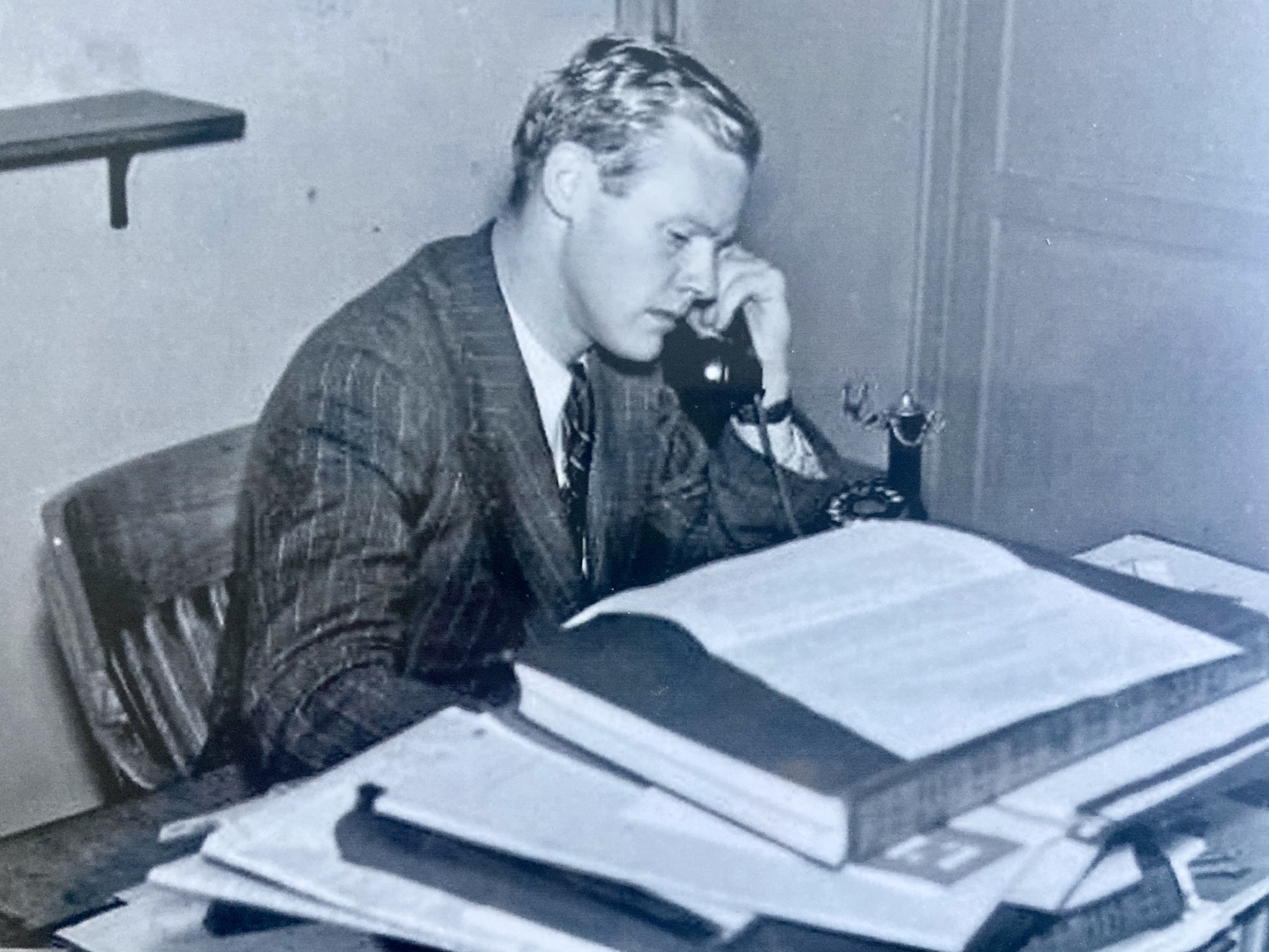
Walter Boardman Kerr at his Herald-Tribune desk

From November 1941 until April 1943, he worked as a foreign correspondent for the New York Herald Tribune in Moscow. He was a true field reporter, being on the frontline and interviewing guerilla leaders. In 1943, he visited Stalingrad and interviewed Lieutenant general Rodion Malinovsky and captured Nazi officers about the Battle of Stalingrad. In 1943, he resigned from The Herald Tribune, joined the US Army and then the Office of Strategic Services, the precursor of the Central Intelligence Agency. He spent his last six Army months collecting documents in Berlin for use in the Nuremberg trials.

In 1944, he published his first book The Russian Army: Its Men, Its Leaders, and Its Battles (21 editions), which was a factual description of the Soviet Army during the war, covering in detail the Battle of Moscow and the Battle of Stalingrad, and contained a chapter on Soviet-Japanese relations. It received a warm welcome in the Soviet Union. In this book, he first explored the question of how the Soviet Army managed to stop the German invasion, first in Moscow and next in Stalingrad.

In 1946, he returned to The Herald Tribune as a diplomatic correspondent and covered all the major post-war conferences. In 1947 he became chief of the Herald Tribune's Paris Bureau. In 1947, Kerr joined a four-man team of Herald Tribune reporters who spent ten weeks behind the Iron Curtain, covering life in the occupied Eastern European countries. According to The Post-Standard, in 1948 he was awarded the Legion of Honour award from the French government. In late 1948 he was recalled to New York to become foreign editor of the Herald Tribune. As of 1949, he was also a member of the Council on Foreign Relations. In 1950, Kerr returned to Paris to become editor for both the Paris and the European editions. In 1954 he was appointed Washington bureau chief. Kerr left The Herald Tribune in March 1956.

From 1956 to 1961, together with his wife he published The American Abroad Magazine in Zürich. From 1962 to 1965 he was the general manager of The New York Times International edition in Paris. On June 1, 1967, Kerr was elected the president of The New Mexican, publisher for The Santa Fe New Mexican and several other newspapers. He knew Robert M. McKinney, The Santa Fe New Mexican owner, since the days when he was an Ambassador to Switzerland under John F. Kennedy. Having moved to Santa Fe, he also became a political adviser to Republican Governor David Cargo. He left Santa Fe in 1990.

In the 70s, Kerr started to work on a book about the Battle of Stalingrad and made several visits to the Soviet Union to gather information. He was granted access to previously classified Soviet documents and came to the conclusion that Stalin had millions of troops concealed both from Hitler's generals and from the Allies, but deliberately chose not to use this resource at once. Kerr published his finding in 1977 in a book titled The Secret of Stalingrad (15 editions). It gained good press in the United States, but it was poorly received in the Soviet Union where it was labeled as "imperialist propaganda".

In 1982, he published his last book The Shabunin Affair: An Episode in the Life of Leo Tolstoy (7 editions) and visited the Soviet Union one more time the next year.

== Personal life ==
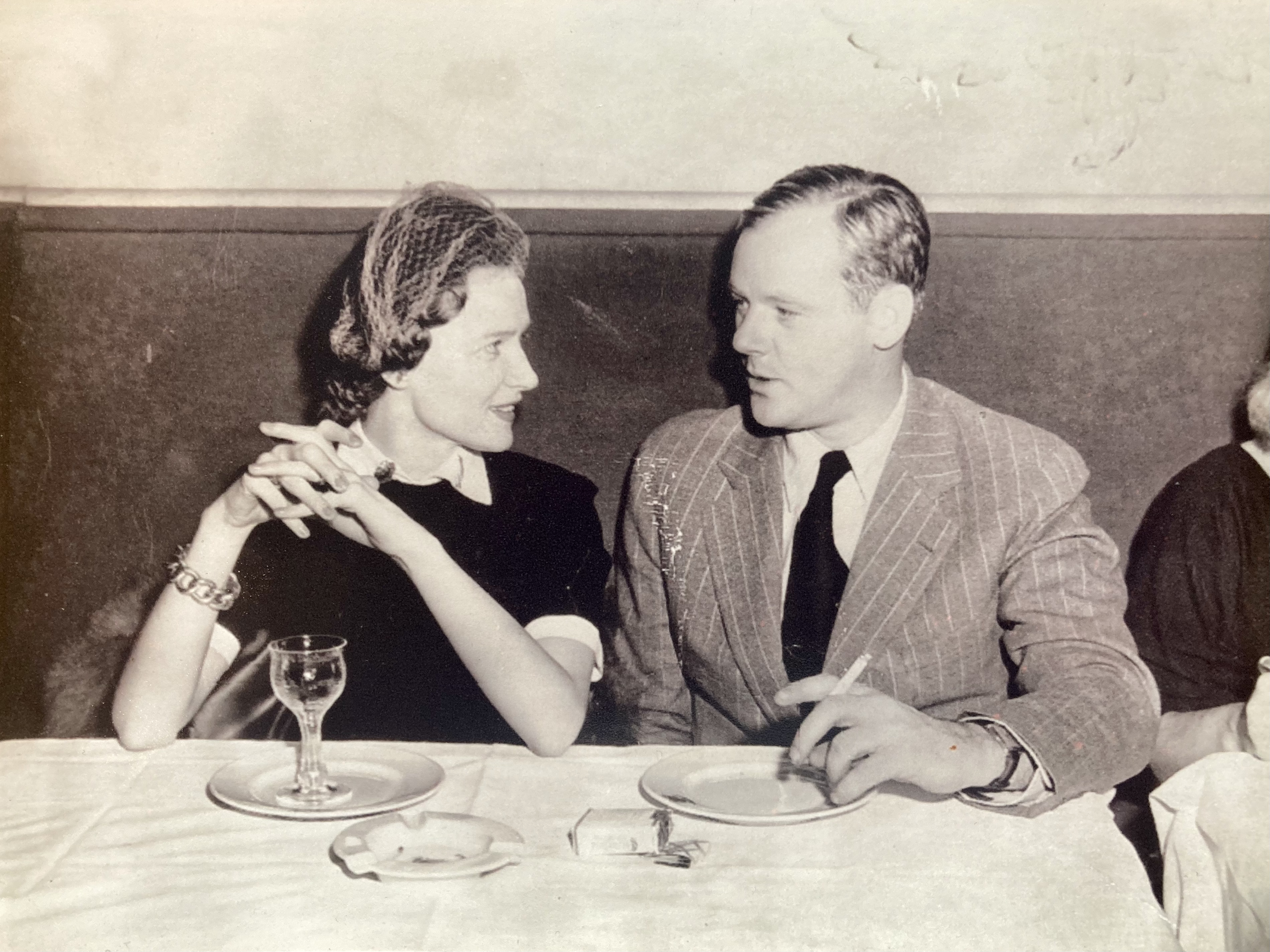
Vivianne Lovell and Walter Boardman Kerr (family archive photo)

On July 8, 1947, Kerr married Vivianne Lovell, a correspondent for Agence France-Presse in Washington, D.C., where she covered the White House and the United States Department of State. She was a daughter of Walter Howland Lovell, a World War I volunteer pilot and an American serviceman. They had two children, Philip Alan Kerr (born in 1948), and Cynthia Boardman Kerr (born in 1950).

== Books ==
- Kerr, Walter Boardman (1944). The Russian Army: Its Men, Its Leaders, and Its Battles. New York: Knopf.
- Kerr, Walter Boardman (1978). The Secret of Stalingrad. Doubleday. ISBN 0385134592.
- Kerr, Walter Boardman (1982). The Shabunin Affair: An Episode in the Life of Leo Tolstoy. Cornell University Press. ISBN 9780801414619.

== Bibliography ==
- William L. Shirer (1940). Berlin Diary: The Journal of a Foreign Correspondent. Knopf. pp. 121, 126, 129, 411, 428.
- Gilenson, Boris (1985). Дорога на Смоленск: американские писатели и журналисты о Великой Отечественной войне советского народа 1941-1945 [Smolensk road: American writers and journalist on the Great Partiotic War of the Soviet people 1941-1945] (in Russian). Progress Publishers.
- Kluger, Richard (1986). The Paper: The Life and Death of the New York Herald Tribune (1st ed.). Knopf. ISBN 978-0394508771.
- Mashtakova, Klara (2009). Легенды и были Кремля. Записки [The legends and tales of Kremlin] (in Russian). AST. ISBN 978-5-17-058056-9.
