= Ariel A. Roth =

American zoologist and creationist (born 1927)

Ariel A. Roth (born 1927) is a zoologist and creationist who was born in Geneva, Switzerland, and now lives in the United States. He is a leading figure in the field of flood geology, having been involved and published extensively on the creation–evolution controversy.

Roth is a former professor and chairman of Biology at Emmanuel Missionary College, now Andrews University and at Loma Linda University. He is also the former director of the Seventh-day Adventist run Geoscience Research Institute at Loma Linda University. He served as editor of the journal Origins for 23 years.

After receiving his PhD in biology at the University of Michigan, Roth pursued research in invertebrate zoology and on fossil and living coral reefs funded by NOAA, the National Institutes of Health, and other government agencies. He obtained additional training to facilitate his research in radiation biology, geology and mathematics at various campuses of the University of California. He has been a longtime member of the Geological Society of America and the Society for Sedimentary Geology. Roth has published many articles in both scientific and popular journals and lectured worldwide.

== Early life ==
Ariel Roth's parents were Andre and Hazel Roth, Seventh-day Adventist missionaries who served in Haiti, France and Switzerland. His oldest brother, Lionel Andre Roth, also attended PUC and graduated with a medical degree from Loma Linda in 1946. He had a sister, Elvire Hilgert.

== Education ==
Roth received his Bachelor of Arts in biology from Pacific Union College in 1948, and his Master of Science in biology (1949) and Ph.D. in parasitology (1955) from the University of Michigan. He received additional training in geology, radiobiology, and mathematics at University of California, Berkeley and University of California, Riverside.

== Career ==
In the fall of 1950, Roth joined the biology department at Pacific Union College (PUC). He worked at PUC until 1957. In 1958, Roth took the place of Frank L. Marsh as chairman of the biology department at Emmanuel Missionary College (EMC), now known as Andrews University.

In 1961, while Roth was head of the biology department at EMC, the United States Public Health Service awarded the department $17,082 to be used in a three-year study of the disease schistosomiasis. During the 1950s and 1960s Roth published several studies related to this disease and its related snail vector.

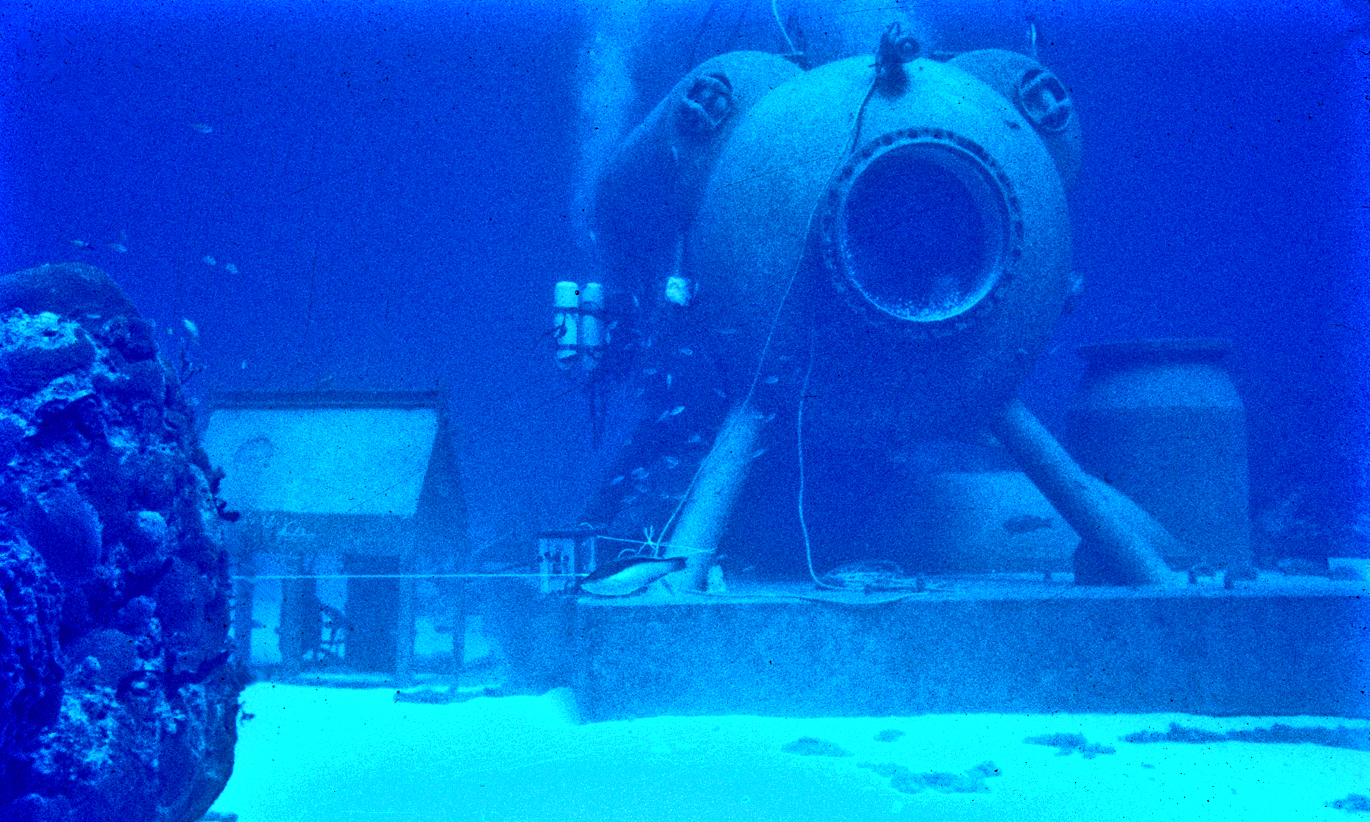
Hydrolab in the Bahamas, 1974.

In May 1974, Roth and two other scientists from Loma Linda University lived for a week fifty feet under the ocean's surface near Freeport, Grand Bahama Island. His team studied coral formations. The three lived in an anchored 18-foot metal hydro-lab when not conducting their experiments. The underwater laboratory and sleeping quarters was operated by the United States National Oceanic and Atmospheric Administration and was used by several groups.

== Academic activities and honors ==
- United States Atomic Energy Commission Grantee in radiation biology (1960)
- National Institutes of Health Grantee for research on metabolism of schistosomes (1961–1963)
- Visiting Research Scientist, Hawaii Institute of Marine Biology (1968, 1970)
- Visiting professor, Andrews University Extension in Europe (1970)
- United States Atomic Energy Commission Grantee for research on coral reefs at Enewetak Atoll (1971, 1972, 1973)
- Member, NSF-AEC sponsored Symbios research team to study coral reef metabolism at Enewetak Atoll (1971)
- Consultant on creation to the California State Board of Education (1971)
- Director, Loma Linda University Research Team for underwater research on coral in the Bahamas (1973, 1974 - Sponsored by the National Oceanic and Atmospheric Administration; lived on the ocean floor for 1 week)
- Listed in Who's Who in America (1974)
- Editor: ORIGINS journal (1974–1996)
- Keynote speaker, public hearing, House Education Committee, Oregon Legislative Assembly (1981)
- Witness for the State of Arkansas: Evolution-creation trial (1981)
- Visiting professor of biology, University of Eastern Africa, Baraton (1995)
- Visiting professor of biology, Spicer College, India (1995)
- Adjunct Professor of Science and Religion, SDA Theological Seminary, Andrews University (1993–1996)
- Recipient Medallion of Distinction, the highest award of the Department of Education of the Seventh-day Adventist Church (1997)
- Visiting professor of biology, Caribbean Union College (1997)
- Lecturer for the William A. Osborne Distinguished Lecture Series, Caribbean Union College (1997)
- Honored alumnus Pacific Union College
- Member, Loma Linda University Councilors (2000- )
- Recipient: Charles Elliott Weniger Award for Excellence 2003

== Advocacy of creationism ==
In late 1972 or early 1973 he presented to the California Board of Education hearings on Creation and the classroom.

In 1980, Roth argued that "Creation and various other views can be supported by the scientific data that reveal that the spontaneous origin of the complex integrated biochemical systems of even the simplest organisms is, at best, a most improbable event", which is regarded as a precursor to Michael Behe's irreducible complexity argument, which has been the subject of considerable empirical refutation from the scientific community. Roth later used a version of this argument in his testimony in McLean v. Arkansas (which struck down the Arkansas Balanced Treatment for Creation-Science and Evolution-Science Act), where he testified in support of the scientific merits of creationism, but admitted that "[i]f you want to define 'science' as testable, predictable" then creation science is not really science. In the same year, he testified before the Oregon House Education Committee in support of a similar "balanced treatment" law. His view is that science should emancipate itself from its limited secularism and "should allow the data of nature to direct . . . wherever it may lead."

== Selected publications ==
Has published nearly 200 articles in the scientific and public press.

1950s

- Roth, A.A. (1955). "Gametogenesis in the final generation of Schistosomatium dotthitti (Cort, 1914) Price, 1931 (Trematoda: Schistosomatidae)". Dissertation Abstracts. 15 (4): 647–648.
- Roth, A.A.; Wagner, E.D. (1957). "The anatomy of the male and female reproductive systems of Onco-melania nosophora". Transactions of the American Microscopical Society. 74 (1): 52–69. doi:10.2307/3223920. JSTOR 3223920.

1960s

- Roth, A.A. 1960. Aspects of the function of the bursa copulatrix and seminal receptacle in the prosobranch snail Oncomelania formosana Pilsbry and Hirase. Transactions of the American Microscopical Society 79: 412–419.
- Roth, A.A. and E.D. Wagner. 1960a. The development of sexual maturity in Oncomelania nosophora (Robson) snail vector of oriental schistosomiasis. Transactions of the American Microscopical Society 79:429-438.
- Roth, A.A. and E.D. Wagner. 1960b. Notes on the production of eggs in Oncomelania nosophora and O. formosana. Nautilus 73:147-151.
- Roth, A.A. and L.N. Hare. 1966. Effect of Schistosoma mansoni on amino acid levels in a chemically defined medium. (Abstract) American Society of Parasitologists, 41st Annual Meeting, San Juan, Puerto Rico, p. 60.
- Roth, A.A. and H.E. Heidtke. 1966. Removal of schisto-somes from hosts with minimal physiological disturbance to the parasite. Transactions of the American Microscopical Society 85:422-426.
- Tkachuck, R.D. and A.A. Roth. 1967. Free amino acids in plasm of mice infected with Schistosoma mansoni. (Abstract) American Society of Parasitologists, 42nd Annual Meeting, Tucson, Arizona, p. 29.
- Carter, C.E. and A.A. Roth. 1967. Carbon dioxide fixation in Schistosoma mansoni. (Abstract) American Society of Parasitologists, 42nd Annual Meeting, Tucson, Arizona, p. 30.

1970s

- Roth, A.A. 1971a. Effect of various light treatments of calcification rates in Acropora sp. (Abstract) R/V Alpha Helix Research Program, 1971, Scripps Institution of Oceanography, San Diego, p. 21.
- Roth, A.A. 1971b. Effect of the addition of nutrients on the variability of calcification rates in a single colony of Pocillopora damicornis. (Abstract) R/V Alpha Helix Research Program, 1971, Scripps Institution of Oceano-graphy, San Diego, pp. 21–22.
- Roth, A.A. 1971c. Estimate of carbonate production of some species on Japtan Reef. (Abstract) R/V Alpha Helix Research Program, 1971, Scripps Institution of Oceanography, San Diego, p. 22.
- Johannes, R.E. and 22 other authors including A.A. Roth. 1972. Project Symbios: an examination of the metabolism of some coral reef communities. BioScience 22:541-543.
- Roth, A.A. 1974c. Factors affecting light as an agent for carbonate production by coral. (Abstract) Geological Society of America Abstracts 6:932.
- Roth, A.A. (1975). "The pervasiveness of the paradigm". Origins. 2: 55–57.
- Roth, A.A. (1975). "Turbidites". Origins. 2: 106–107.
- Roth, A.A. 1975e. Some effects of light on calcification in coral. Abstracts of Symposia and Contributed Papers for the Fifty-Sixth Annual Meeting (San Francisco State University, December 26–30, 1975) of the Western Society of Naturalists, p. 29.
- Clausen, C.D. and A.A. Roth. 1975a. Estimation of coral growth rates from laboratory 45Ca-incorporation rates. Marine Biology 33:85-91.
- Clausen, C.D.; Roth, A.A. (1975b). "Effect of temperature and temperature adaptation on calcification rate in the hermatypic coral Pocillopora damicornis". Marine Biology. 33 (2): 93–100. Bibcode:1975MarBi..33...93C. doi:10.1007/bf00390713. S2CID 83719110.
- Smith, A.D. and A.A. Roth. 1977. Carbon dioxide and calcification in the red coralline alga, Bossiella orbigniana. (Abstract) Pacific Division, American Associa-tion for the Advancement of Science, 58th Annual Meeting, San Francisco State University.
- Roth, A.A. (1978c). "Creation concepts should be taught in public schools". Liberty. 73 (5): 3, 24–27.; Rebuttal, 28–29.
- Smith, A.D.; Roth, A.A. (1979). "Effect of carbon dioxide concentration on calcification in the red coralline alga Bossiella orbigniana". Marine Biology. 52 (3): 217–225. Bibcode:1979MarBi..52..217S. doi:10.1007/bf00398135. S2CID 84580089.

1980s

- Roth, A.A. 1980a. Implications of various interpretations of the fossil record. Origins 7:71-86.
- Crabtree, D.M., C.D. Clausen, and A.A. Roth. 1980. Consistency in growth line counts in bivalve specimens. Palaeogeography, Palaeoclimatology, Palaeoecology 29:323-340.
- Roth, A.A., C.D. Clausen, P.Y. Yahiku, V.E. Clausen, and W.W. Cox. 1982. Some effects of light on coral growth. Pacific Science 36:65-81.
- Roth, A.A. 1983b. Why some scientists believe in creation. These Times 92(3):6-11.
- Roth, A.A. 1984a. The current controversy over origins. Part I: teaching creation in public schools. The Journal of Adventist Education 46(3):30-31,35-37.
- Roth, A.A. 1984b. The current controversy over origins. Part II: Seventh-day Adventists and the creation movement in the United States. The Journal of Adventist Education 46(4):31-32,39-40.
- Hodges, L.T. and Roth, A.A. 1986. Orientation of corals and stromatoporoids in some Pleistocene, Devonian, and Silurian reef facies. Journal of Paleontology 60:1147-1158.

1990s

- Roth, A.A. (1995). "Fossil reefs and time". Origins. 22: 86–104.
- Roth, A.A. 1998. The disadvantage of collective ignorance. The Record (Australia), August 29, 1998, p. 3.
- Roth, Ariel Adrean (1998). Origins: linking science and Scripture. Hagerstown, MD: Review and Herald Publishing Association. p. 9. ISBN 0-8280-1328-4.(Book now in 17 languages.)
- Roth, A.A. 1999. Chapter Essay. In Ashton, J.F. In Six Days. New Holland Publishers. p. 74-89.

2000s

- Roth, A.A. 2000. The Grand Canyon and the Genesis Flood. In Baldwin J.T. Creation, Catastrophe, and Calvary. Review and Herald Publishing Association. p. 97-103.
- Roth, A.A. 2001. Commonly Asked questions about science and the Bible. The Journal of Adventist Education. 64(2): 9–18.
- Roth, A.A. 2003. Genesis and the geologic column. Dialogue 15(1): 9–12, 18.
- Roth, A.A. 2003. Implications of parconformities. Geoscience Reports No. 36: 1–5.
- Roth, A.A. 2005. Design in nature: Evidence for a Creator. In Wesracott, M.J. and Ashton J.F. editors. The Big Argument. Sydney: Strand Publishing. p. 99-122.
- Roth, A.A., Zoutewelle T., Hornbacher D. 2006. Complex concretions in the Jurassic Morrison Formation. Geological Society of America, Abstracts with Programs 39(6): 7.
- Roth, A.A. 2008. Science Discovers God: Seven convincing lines of evidence for His existence. Hagerstown, MD: Review and Herald Publishing Association. (Book now in 28 languages.)
- Roth, A.A. 2009. Flat gaps in sedimentary rock layers challenge long geologic ages. Journal of Creation 23(2): 76–81.

2010s

- Roth, A.A. 2011. Can I believe in a worldwide flood? In Gibson L.J., Rasi H.M., editors. Understanding Creation. Nampa, ID: Pacific Press Publishing Association. p. 123-132.
- Roth, A.A. 2012. The Genesis Flood and the geological record. In Ball, B.W., editor: In the Beginning: Science and Scripture Confirm Creation. Nampa, ID: Pacific Press Publishing Association. p. 220-237.
- Roth, A.A. 2013. The Bible and science: A new free illustrated resource for teachers and students. Journal of Adventist Education, February/March, p. 44-46.
- Roth, A.A., Nick, K.E., Zoutewellw T., and Hornbacher D. 2019. Complex siliceous concretions in the Jurassic Morrison Formation, Church Rock, New Mexico, USA: Implications of inorganic factors in ichnological interpretations. Sedimentary Geology, Vol. 392, Article 105526, October, 1. https://doi.org/10.1016/j.sedgeo.2019.105526

2020s

- Roth, A.A. 2021. Flat Gaps in the Rock Layers Challenge Long Geologic Layers In Gibson, L.J., Nalin R., and Rasi H.M., editors. Design and Catastrophe: 51 Scientists Explore Evidence in Nature. Andrews University Press. Chapter 47.

== See also ==
- Leonard R. Brand
- Creation and evolution in public education
- Flood geology
- Geoscience Research Institute
- McLean v. Arkansas
- Young Earth creationism
