= Alexander Hislop =

Free Church of Scotland minister (1807–1865)

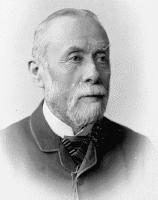
Portrait of Alexander Hislop

Alexander Hislop (1807 – 13 March 1865) was a Free Church of Scotland minister known for his criticisms of the Catholic Church. He was the son of Stephen Hislop (died 1837), a mason by occupation and an elder of the Relief Church. Alexander's brother was also named Stephen Hislop and became well known in his time as a missionary to India and a naturalist.

Alexander was born and raised in Duns, Berwickshire. He was for a time parish schoolmaster of Wick, Caithness. In 1831 he married Jane Pearson. He was for a time editor of the Scottish Guardian newspaper. As a probationer he joined the Free Church of Scotland at the Disruption of 1843. He was ordained in 1844 at the East Free Church, Arbroath, where he became senior minister in 1864. He died of a paralytic stroke in Arbroath the next year after being ill for about two years.

He wrote several books, his most famous being The Two Babylons: Papal Worship Proved to be the Worship of Nimrod and His Wife.

== The Two Babylons ==
This book, initially published in 1853 as a pamphlet, was greatly revised and expanded and released as a book in 1858 with several editions.

In the book, Hislop argued that the Catholic Church was a Babylonian mystery cult and pagan, but Protestants worshipped the true Jesus and the true God. He believed that Catholic religious practices are pagan practices that were grafted onto true Christianity during the reign of Constantine. Then, the merger between the Roman state religion and its adoration of the mother and child was transferred to Christianity, merging Christian characters with pagan mythology. The goddess was renamed Mary, and Jesus was the renamed Jupiter-Puer, or "Jupiter the Boy".

Hislop believed that the goddess, in Rome called Venus or Fortuna, was the Roman name of the more ancient Babylonian cult of Ishtar, whose origins began with a blonde-haired and blue-eyed woman named Semiramis.

According to Hislop, Semiramis was an exceedingly beautiful woman, who gave birth to a son named Tammuz, was instrumental as the queen, and wife of Nimrod the founder of Babylon, and its religion, complete with a pseudo-Virgin Birth. Later, Nimrod was killed, and Semiramis, pregnant with his child, claimed the child was Nimrod reborn.

Hislop attempted to show that the cult and worship of Semiramis spread globally, her name changing with the culture. In Egypt she was Isis, in Greece and Rome she was called Venus, Diana, Athena, and a host of other names, but was always prayed to and central to the faith which was based on Babylonian mystery religion. According to Hislop, Constantine, though claiming to convert to Christianity, remained pagan but renamed the gods and goddesses with Christian names to merge the two faiths for his political advantage.

Constantine's endorsement of the tradition was a turning point for Early Christianity. In 313, Constantine issued the Edict of Milan legalizing Christian worship. The emperor became a great patron of the Church, and set a precedent for the position of the Christian Emperor within the Church and the notion of orthodoxy, Christendom, and ecumenical councils that would be followed for centuries as the State church of the Roman Empire.

== Books by Alexander Hislop ==
(Sources of information include COPAC)

- The Light of Prophecy let in on the dark places of the Papacy (exposition of 2 Thess 2: 3–12) (Edinburgh, 1846)
- The Red Republic; or Scarlet Coloured Beast of the Apocalypse (Edinburgh, 1849)
- The Rev. E.B. Elliott and the "Red Republic" (Arbroath, circa 1850)#
- The Two Babylons; or, the Papal Worship proved to be the worship of Nimrod and his wife (Edinburgh, 1853 & 1858)
- The Moral Identity of Babylon and Rome (London, 1855)
- Infant Baptism, according to the Word of God and confession of faith. Being a review, in five letters, of the new theory of Professor Lumsden, as advocated in his treatise entitled, "Infant baptism: its nature and objects." (Edinburgh, 1856)
- The Scriptural Principles of the Solemn League and Covenant: in their bearing on the present state of the Episcopal churches (Glasgow, 1858)
- Truth and Peace (in reply to a pamphlet, entitled "Charity and mutual forbearance" by "Irenicus") (Arbroath, 1858)
- Christ's Crown and Covenant: or national covenanting essentially connected with national revival (Arbroath and Edinburgh, 1860)
- The Trial of Bishop Forbes (A lecture delivered in East Free Church, Arbroath) (Edinburgh, 1860)
- Unto the Venerable the General Assembly of the Free Church of Scotland: the petition of the undersigned (relates to James Lumsden on "Infant Baptism": Hislop was head signatory of this petition) (Edinburgh, 1860)
- The Proverbs of Scotland
- The Book of Scottish Anecdote
