= Duns, Scottish Borders =

Town in Scottish Borders, Scotland

Coordinates: 55.77838°N 2.3426°W

Duns
- Town
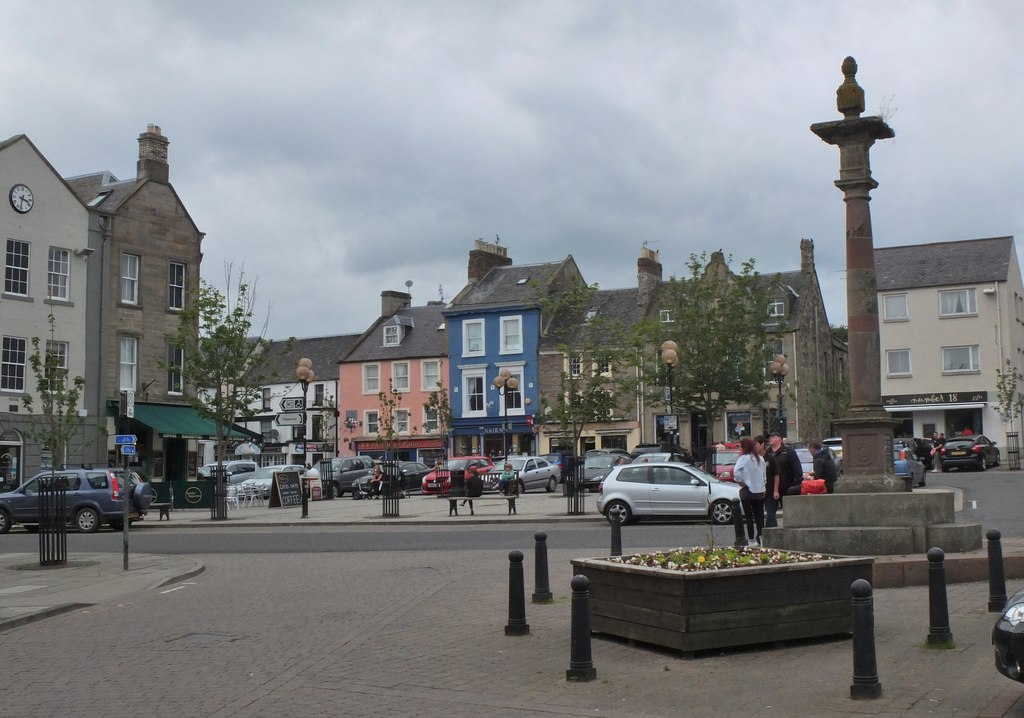
- Market Square

- Location within the Scottish Borders
- Population: 3,127 (2022)
- OS grid reference: NT786539
- Council area: Scottish Borders
- Lieutenancy area: Berwickshire
- Country: Scotland
- Sovereign state: United Kingdom
- Post town: DUNS
- Postcode district: TD11
- Dialling code: 01361
- Police: Scotland
- Fire: Scottish
- Ambulance: Scottish
- UK Parliament: Berwickshire, Roxburgh and Selkirk
- Scottish Parliament: Ettrick, Roxburgh and Berwickshire

Duns is a historic market town in the Scottish Borders, Scotland. Historically the county town of the historic county of Berwickshire, it acts as a local commercial and service centre for the surrounding rural and agricultural area. It had a population of 3,127 in 2022.

== History ==
=== Early history ===
Duns Law, the original site of the town of Duns, has the remains of an Iron Age hillfort at its summit. Similar structures nearby, such as the structure at Edin's Hall Broch, suggest the area's domestic and defensive use at a very early stage.

=== Middle ages ===
Despite the town most likely dating its origins back to the 1000s, the first written mention of Duns is prior to 1179, when a 'Hugo de Duns' witnessed a charter of Roger d'Eu, of a grant of the benefice of the church of Langton to Kelso Abbey. The town is further mentioned when a "Robert of Douns" signed the Ragman Roll in 1296. The early settlement was sited on the slopes of Duns Law, close to the original Duns Castle built in 1320 by the Earl of Moray, nephew of Robert the Bruce. The town was frequently attacked by the English in border raids and as they headed north to the Lothians. In 1318 at Duns Park, the Earl of Dunbar, Sir James Douglas, and Sir Thomas Randolph met with their respective forces, prior to the retaking of Berwick by the Scots. In 1333 the Guardian of Scotland, Sir Archibald Douglas, mustered an army in Duns to march on Berwick, which at that time was under siege by the English. The Scots troops were heavily defeated at the Battle of Halidon Hill.

1377 saw the Earl of Northumberland invade Scotland. Camped at Duns, his army's horses were alarmed at night by the rattles used by the inhabitants to scare birds from their crops. The disarrayed English force was routed by the townsmen. The event is known as the Battle of Duns, and is the source of the town's motto, "Duns Dings A!"

In 1513, some 6 miles (10 km) to the north of the town at Ellemford, James IV of Scotland mustered his army, prior to his campaign that would lead to the disastrous Battle of Flodden.

=== Early modern ===
The town was created a Burgh of Barony in 1490 by James IV heritably for John and George Hume of Ayton, and the townsfolk were given the right to hold a market every Wednesday, and to hold a week-long annual fair between Pentecost and Trinity Sunday. Duns suffered badly in cross-border raiding and feuding, and was burned to the ground three times within 14 years, in 1544, 1545 and 1558 during the war of the Rough Wooing.

By 1588, the town had relocated from the top of Duns Law to its present location at its foot. The burgh's ruined original location has since been known as the Bruntons (a corruption of Burnt-town).

In the autumn of 1517, Duns Market Cross was also the destination of the head of the Sieur de la Bastie, the French Ambassador and Warden of the Eastern March, following his murder at Preston, by Home of Wedderburn.

"Bautie, tha heidet, and in the toun of Dunce his heid affixt on a staik, that all men mycht se it, September xix."

In 1630, Duns was home to a Margaret Lumsden, who was supposedly the victim of demonic possession. She was brought to Edinburgh to be investigated by John Maitland, 1st Earl of Lauderdale and the Privy Council of Scotland, and arrangements were made to have her and her immediate family lodged in the Canongate Tolbooth. Lauderdale's son John Maitland, 1st Duke of Lauderdale recounted the story in a letter to Richard Baxter which he published in his work, The certainty of the World of Spirits. Margaret Lumsden was said to be a poor uneducated woman, yet when spoken to in Latin by the local minister, John Weemes, she is said to have replied in better Latin than he had himself.

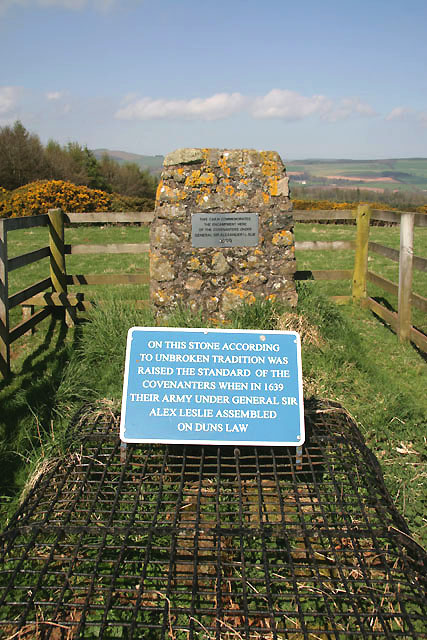
Stone Memorial to Leslie's army on Duns law

In 1639, during the First Bishops' War, Duns became the mustering point for the Covenanting army led by General Leslie, gathered there to face King Charles I's English host encamped at Berwick. Leslie took up residence in the Castle and ordered a redoubt to be constructed on Duns Law. The opposing armies did not engage but on 18 June, the Pacification of Berwick was signed. The remains of Leslie's fortifications are still evident on top of Duns Law.

Oliver Cromwell put a garrison into the town after the Battle of Dunbar on 3 September 1650.

By 1670, the town and the estate were bought by Sir John Cockburn of Cockburn from the Homes of Ayton, who had a regrant of the Burgh charter. The estate was then sold in 1696 to John Hay, 1st Marquess of Tweeddale who granted to his son the Lord William Hay following his marriage to Elizabeth Seton, a daughter of Alexander Seton, 1st Viscount of Kingston.

In the peace following the end of the Jacobite rebellion in 1746, Duns began to expand and many of the administrative functions of Berwickshire were carried out in the town. In 1903, a bill first introduced by the Secretary for Scotland in 1900 was passed confirming Duns as the county town of Berwickshire when nearby Greenlaw lost that status the following year.

Within living memory, Duns had a tolbooth or town hall on its Market Square. This was used for the administration of the burgh and for dealing with malefactors: the first such structure was built in 1328, presumably in the old town at Duns Law; the second was built following Cockburn's rechartering of the burgh in 1680. The 1680 building was badly damaged by fire in 1795, and was replaced by a third building designed by the architect James Gillespie Graham in 1816. The structure was demolished in 1966.

=== County town ===
Duns Act 1661
- Act of Parliament
- Parliament of Scotland
- Long title: Act declareing the toun of Dunce the heid Burgh of the Shirreffdome of Berwick. —
- Citation: 1661 c. 136

Dates
- Royal assent: 3 April 1661

Other legislation
- Repealed by: Statute Law Revision (Scotland) Act 1906

Status: Repealed

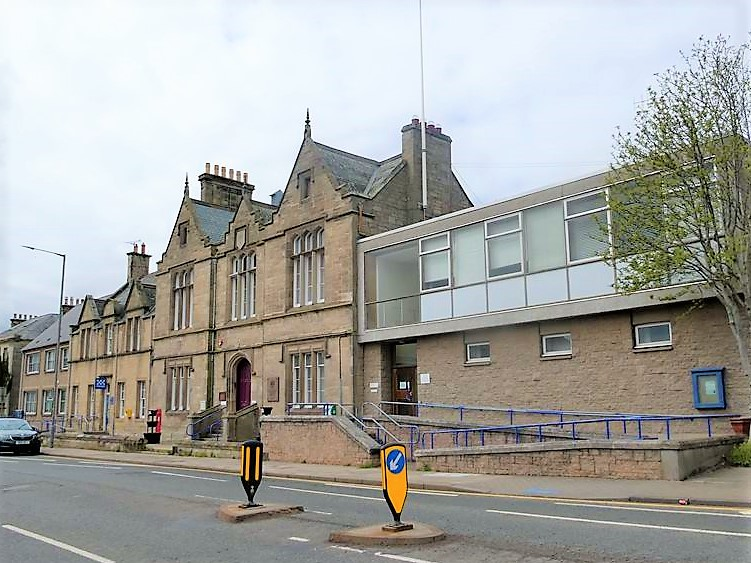
County Buildings, 8 Newtown Street

After Berwickshire's original county town of Berwick-upon-Tweed was finally ceded to English control in 1482, Duns and Lauder initially shared the role of county town between them (principally hosting the sheriff court), until 1596 when Greenlaw was declared the county town. Duns was made county town again by the Duns Act 1661 (c. 136), but lost the role back to Greenlaw in 1696. By the mid-nineteenth century it was felt that Duns was the more important town than Greenlaw, which remained a small village. The Berwickshire Courts Act 1853 (16 & 17 Vict. c. 27) was passed allowing the courts and meetings of the county's Commissioners of Supply to be held at Duns as well as at the County Hall in Greenlaw. County Buildings was subsequently built at 8 Newtown Street in Duns in 1856.

Elected county councils were established in 1890 under the Local Government (Scotland) Act 1889, taking over most of the functions of the commissioners. Berwickshire County Council held its first meeting on 22 May 1890 at County Hall in Greenlaw, when it decided by 18 votes to 12 that all subsequent meetings should be held at Duns. The county council therefore based itself at the County Buildings in Duns, sharing the premises with its continuing use as a sheriff court. The county council subsequently established additional offices in various converted houses along Newtown Street. A modern extension was added to County Buildings in 1967.

Greenlaw was still considered the official county town after 1890, despite the county council meeting in Duns and courts being held at both towns. The Berwickshire County Town Act 1903 (3 Edw. 7. c. 5) finally revoked Greenlaw's status as county town and declared Duns to be the county town for all purposes. The County Buildings on Newtown Street served as the headquarters of Berwickshire County Council until 1975, then became the offices of Berwickshire District Council from 1975 until 1996. It also served as the county's sheriff court until 2015.

== Modern day ==
Duns has the largest shopping facilities in a radius of 15 miles (24 km) and until 28 January 2015 housed the Berwickshire Sheriff Court, it no longer has any principal offices of the Scottish Borders Council, but merely retains a Registry Office.

Since the early 1990s Duns and its immediate vicinity have seen substantial housing development, some controversial. A development near the golf club on the road to Longformacus just outside Duns is one such example, as it was built upon greenfield sites.

Opposite the old Berwickshire High School a new modern High School has been constructed to replace the mid-1950s buildings in which the school was previously housed. The new High School opened in February 2009.

The old high school has, as of 2017, been redeveloped into a primary school, with the rugby and football club using the old playing fields.

== Castle ==
The Hay family were responsible for the present Gothic Revival structure; prior to that, it had been a substantial Peel tower built in 1320 by the Earl of Moray who had been granted the estate by Robert I.

== Country houses ==
The surrounding area once had a considerable number of notable country houses. Those surviving include:

- The Edwardian mansion Manderston House (rebuilt in 1903), the home of a Liberal Peer, Lord Palmer, just outside the burgh on the A6105 road to Berwick-upon-Tweed.
- The early 18th century Edrom House (after architect James Smith), 2 miles (3.2 km) east of Manderston and formerly the home of the model, Stella Tennant who is buried in Edrom Cemetery in the grounds of Edrom Church adjacent to her home.
- About a mile east of Edrom stands Blanerne Castle, an ancient seat of the Lumsden family, rebuilt by architect William Burn in 1895 following a fire. Its ruined mediaeval Pele Tower stands nearby.
- Nisbet House (c. 1630) with its great tower (1774) is about 1.5 miles (2.4 km) south of the town, now restored as a family home.
- Cairnbank House (c. 1787) is a Category B-listed house built by Robert Ainslie of Laws. It has been in the Pate family since 1913.
- Wedderburn Castle (1771–1775, by architects Robert and James Adam) is 2 miles (3.2 km) east of Duns and is built on the site of the earlier Tower house. It is the seat of the Homes of Wedderburn.
- Further south lies Kimmerghame House, a Scottish Baronial mansion completely rebuilt in 1851 by architect David Bryce, almost destroyed by fire in 1938 but again much rebuilt. It is now the seat of a former Lord Lieutenant of Berwickshire, Major-General Sir John Swinton (father of the actress Tilda Swinton).

== The Jim Clark Motorsport Museum ==
The town hosts the Jim Clark Motorsport Museum. The Clark family lived on a farm by Chirnside, near Duns. Among his many achievements, Jim Clark was Formula 1 World Champion in 1963 and 1965, with 72 Grand Prix starts, 25 Wins, and 33 Pole Positions. Originally opened in 1969 as a Memorial Room, the building was expanded and the museum opened in 2019 and displays his Lotus race car, a rally car, overalls worn by Clark, and over 100 trophies. Other ephemera include numerous archive material from newspapers, books, magazines and films.

== Polish War Memorial ==
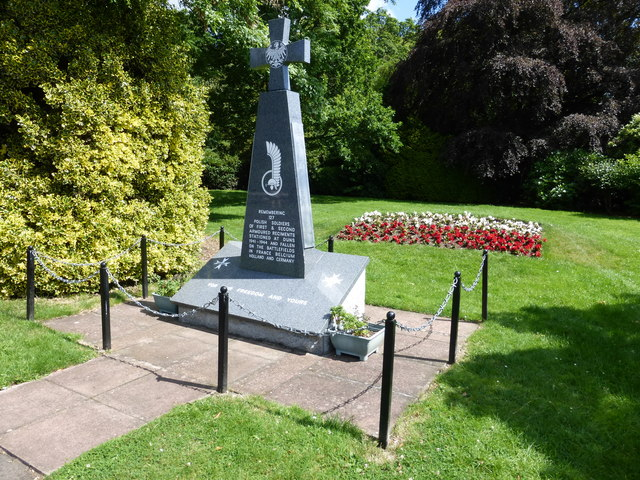
Polish War Memorial, Duns

During the Second World War, the Scottish Borders was home to many Polish soldiers, who had come here to form new regiments prior to returning south to go the front in Europe. Duns, and the surrounding area, was home to the First and Second Armoured Regiments of the Polish Army, who learned and practised their armoured warfare skills on the moors of Berwickshire. It was as a tribute to the 127 men of these regiments who died in the conflict, that Polish ex-soldiers and the people of Duns, jointly, paid for the erection of this monument. It was unveiled in 1981 by their former Commanding Officer, General Maczek.

As well as this a memorial to Wojtek, a Syrian brown bear which was adopted by the Polish army in 1943, can be found in the Market Square. The memorial was gifted by the twin town of Żagań in Poland and was unveiled in 2016.

== Transport ==
Duns was historically connected to the railway network by the Berwickshire Railway but that closed to passengers on 10 September 1951, and to goods traffic during the Beeching closures on 7 November 1966.

Two A roads pass through the town; the A6105 which runs west to east from Earlston to Berwick on Tweed and the A6112 which runs south to north from Coldstream to Grantshouse.

The town is served by the regular Perryman's 60 service between Galashiels and Berwick-upon-Tweed. It is also served by Travelsure service 34 to Eyemouth and Berwick-upon-Tweed, and Travelsure service 260 and Wait's service 18 which both serve Chirnside, Berwick-upon-Tweed and Tweedmouth.

== Media ==
Local news and television programmes are provided by BBC Scotland and ITV Border. Television signals are received from the Selkirk transmitter and a local relay transmitter situated in Eyemouth. BBC North East and Cumbria can also be received from the Chatton TV transmitter.

Local radio stations are BBC Radio Scotland on 94.1 FM, BBC Radio Newcastle can also be heard on 96.0, and Greatest Hits Radio Scottish Borders and North Northumberland on 103.4 FM.

The Border Telegraph and Southern Reporter are the town's local newspapers.

== Education ==
Duns primary school, previously located near the town centre in a Victorian building, moved to refurbished premises in the old Berwickshire High School in 2017. The new Berwickshire High School opened in 2009 and is located to the west of the town on the A6105 and provides higher education not only for pupils from Duns but also the many surrounding villages and wider rural community. Borders College also has a small campus in the town.

== The Ba game of Duns ==
This is a kind of medieval football. Three balls or "Bas" were required for this game; the first was gold, the second silvered, and the third coloured or spotted. A fourth was provided in case of mishap, and if not needed was presented to the subscriber whose entertainment had been most hospitable, the Hay family at Duns Castle usually being the recipients.

At mid-day the honour of throwing up the ball would be auctioned in the Kirkyard. The throw would invariably be performed by a member of the Duns Castle family. At 1 o'clock the game began, the Ba being thrown up in the Market Square. The goal for the married men was the pulpit of the church; if a goal was scored then the church bell would rung by the victors. The goal of the bachelors was the hopper of any of the grinding mills in the district, the nearest being over a mile (1500 m) away. If a bachelor won the Ba he would be dusted with flour and receive a meal of pork and dumplings from the miller.

== Notable people ==
- Sir Whitelaw Ainslie (1767–1837) surgeon and medical author
- Louise Aitken-Walker (b. 1960), racing driver
- Reverend Thomas Boston (1676–1732), theologian and Presbyterian minister
- John Black (1783–1855), journalist and editor of the Morning Chronicle
- John Brown (1735–1788), physician
- Dr Samuel Cockburn (1823–1915), medical doctor and homeopath, outspoken defender of homeopathy and critic of the medical establishment
- Cadwallader Colden (1688–1776), colonial governor of New York
- Andrew Cowan (1936-2019), rally driver and team manager
- Cecil Dixon, cricketer
- Reverend Professor John Duns (1820-1910) Professor of Natural Science at Edinburgh University 1864-1903
- John Fordyce (1819–1902), missionary
- Robert Fortune (1812–1880), botanist, introduced tea from China to India
- James Grainger (1721–1766), poet and doctor
- James Gray (c.1770-1830), poet, linguist, and clergyman
- Alexander Hislop (1807–1865), author of The Two Babylons
- Robert Hogg (1818–1897), botanist
- Walter Hume Kerr (1861-1936), archaeologist
- Tom Lockie (1906–1977), footballer and manager
- Reverend Thomas M'Crie (1772–1835), historian and divine
- William MacLeod, Anglican priest
- Pat Nevin (b. 1963), Scottish international football player
- Garry Pearson (b. 1991), rally driver (2021 Scottish Rally Champion)
- Abraham Robertson (1751–1826), mathematician
- Blessed John Duns Scotus (c. 1266 – 1308), theologian, scholar and logician
- Euan Thorburn (b. 1986), rally driver (2013 BTRDA Gold star champion)
- Jock Wightman (1912–1964), footballer
- Alexander Wilson (d. 1922), photographer

== Twin town ==
Duns is twinned with:

- Żagań, Żagań County, Poland.

== See also ==
- Duns Castle nature reserve
- List of places in the Scottish Borders
- List of places in Scotland
- Battle of Duns
- Knoll Hospital

== Sources ==
- Bain, Joseph, ed. (1881). Calendar of documents relating to Scotland preserved in Her Majesty's Public Record Office, London. Vol. II. Edinburgh: H. M. General Register House.
- Baxter, Richard (1691). The Certainty of the Worlds of Spirits. London.
- Hume Brown, Peter, ed. (1901). The Register of the Privy Council of Scotland. Vol. III. Edinburgh: H.M. General Register House.
- Paul, James Balfour, ed. (1882). Registrum magni sigilli regum Scotorum: The register of the Great seal of Scotland, A.D. 1306-1668 (in Latin). Edinburgh: General Register House.
- Groome, Francis Hindes, ed. (1884). Ordnance Gazetteer of Scotland: A Survey of Scottish Topography, Statistical, Biographical, and Historical. Vol. II. Edinburgh: T.C. Jack.
- Ridpath, George (1776). The border-history of England and Scotland.
- Strang, Charles Alexander (1974). Borders and Berwick: an illustrated architectural guide to the Scottish Borders and Tweed Valley. Rutland Press. ISBN 1-873190-10-7.
