= English invasion of Scotland (1482) =

Part of the Anglo-Scottish Wars

- Part of the Anglo-Scottish Wars
Date	July – August 1482
Location	Berwick-upon-Tweed, England
Result	English capture Berwick but otherwise inconclusive

Belligerents
Kingdom of Scotland	Kingdom of England

Commanders and leaders
Lord Hailes; Earl of Crawford	Duke of Gloucester; Duke of Albany; Lord Stanley

Strength
500	20,000

Casualties and losses
Unknown	Unknown

Berwick Castle
- Northumberland, England, UK

Location
- Location in Northumberland
- Coordinates: 55.775°N 2.013°W
- Grid reference: NT992535

In July 1482, an English army invaded Scotland during the Anglo-Scottish Wars. The town of Berwick-upon-Tweed and its castle were captured and the English army briefly occupied Edinburgh. These events followed the signing of the Treaty of Fotheringhay, 11 June 1482, in which Alexander Stewart, Duke of Albany, the brother of James III of Scotland declared himself King of Scotland and swore loyalty to Edward IV of England. The follow-up invasion of Scotland under the command of Edward's brother, Richard, Duke of Gloucester failed to install Albany on the throne, but Berwick has remained English ever since the castle surrendered on 24 August 1482. The English army left Edinburgh with a promise for the repayment of the dowry paid for the marriage of Princess Cecily of England to the Scottish Crown Prince.

== Treaty of Fotheringhay ==
Edward IV was disappointed by the failure of his 1474 treaty with James III who had promised that his son, Prince James would marry Cecily of York. The betrothal was made in October 1474 with a forty-five year truce to last until 1519. Her dowry payments were to be made yearly, starting on 3 February 1475 in Edinburgh, brought by Edward's servants from Norham Castle, and a meeting was to be held to resolve the dispute over the 'fish-garth', a salmon trap on the Esk. Since February 1475, Edward's officers had delivered instalments of Cecilia's 20,000 mark dowry to James's treasurer in St Giles, Edinburgh.

However, border conflict had restarted in 1480, perhaps due to Scotland's Auld Alliance with France. According to a chronicle, the Earl of Angus had attacked Bamburgh Castle, and the Earl of Northumberland had raided in Scotland. By October, James III had written to Louis XI of France asking for guns and artillerymen to repulse further attacks. Eleven ships were put on war-footing for Scotland in February 1481 and Sir Robert Radcliffe was commanded to arm a fleet with guns and gunners on 8 July 1480. These ships made raids in Forth, attacking Blackness Castle and harassing shipping in the spring and autumn of 1481. There does not seem to have been a land-based invasion of Scotland, but there were three raids into England by a Scottish army in that year. Edward IV had made invasion preparations and began to travel north, but went no further than Nottingham.

In May, James III's brother, Alexander, Duke of Albany, landed in England at Southampton from France in a Scottish carvel, the Michael, captained by James Douglas. Edward IV seized this new opportunity to invade Scotland, hired Master Douglas and his ship on 9 May, and summoned fighting-men for the cause of the "king of Scotland" on 10 May 1482. Edward IV, Albany and Richard, Duke of Gloucester made a formal treaty at Fotheringhay Castle near Peterborough, where Mary, Queen of Scots was imprisoned and executed a century later. According to the treaty, Alexander, if he became King of Scotland, would reserve to Edward IV the town of Berwick upon Tweed, Lochmaben Castle with land in southern Scotland in Annandale, Liddesdale, Eskdale, and Ewesdale. He would do homage to Edward IV and break the Auld Alliance with France. If he could extract himself from other engagements in the sight of the Church, he would marry Cecily of York. He had already married Anne de la Tour, the daughter of the Count of Auvergne and Bouillon in January. On 11 June 1482, Albany signed "Alexander R.," for Alexander, Rex.

== The invasion ==
Edward IV had been preparing an army of 20,000 men to invade Scotland by sea and land, and on 12 June Richard, Duke of Gloucester was made commander, with John Elrington appointed war-treasurer on 22 June 1482. One of his officers, Francis Lovell, had his orders before 24 June, as he wrote that he could not travel south from Tanfield near Durham for the feast of John the Baptist as he had a command in Gloucester's army. Equipped with 2,000 sheaves of arrows and ordnance brought from Newcastle upon Tyne by 120 cart horses, the English army assembled at Alnwick. Gloucester and Albany went forward to capture Berwick. The town had been in Scottish hands for the previous twenty years after the Lancastrian fugitives Henry VI of England, and his wife Margaret of Anjou gave it to James, and was held by David Lindsay, Earl of Crawford and Andrew, Lord Gray. They surrendered by negotiation, although the castle held out for Scotland.

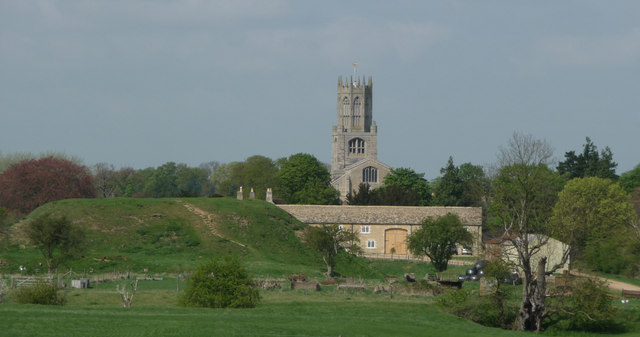
Edward IV and the Duke of Albany made a deal to invade Scotland at Fotheringhay Castle

=== Blackadder Castle ===
According to testimony made in a legal action in 1501, Richard, Duke of Gloucester, came to Blackadder Castle and his ally the Duke of Albany ordered the "great house and tower of Blackadder" to be destroyed. Albany's supporters Philip Nesbit, John Lumsden of Blanerne, and Patrick Sleich of Cumledge helped convey the Duke of Gloucester from Blackadder to Berwick. The Blackadder family sought reparations from Nesbit, Lumsden, and Sleich in 1501 and they denied their presence. According to Hall's Chronicle, "Blakater and the Branke" was one of several fortified locations to the west of Berwick captured and demolished or burnt by the two Dukes while siege was laid to Berwick Castle and before the march towards Edinburgh.

=== Lauder Bridge ===
The English army moved west from Berwick and divided into two. The Earl of Northumberland stayed on the Scottish border taking castles and bastle houses and burning farms at Kirk Yetholm, Bemersyde, Morebattle, Roxburgh, Jedburgh, Ednam, and other places. Richard, Duke of Gloucester also moved west to Kimmerghame with the support of James, Earl of Douglas. Near Duns he turned north-west to Edinburgh, or returned towards Berwick before making for Edinburgh as the Blackadder testimony suggests.

The Scottish army of James III got no further south than Lauder Bridge, to the west of Gloucester's route, where there was some kind of mutiny involving Archibald, Earl of Angus. The exact events at Lauder are unclear, but later chronicles relate that some of the king's favourites including the architect Robert Cochrane, merchant Thomas Preston, his tailor James Hommyll, and the composer William Roger were hanged from the bridge. The existence of some of these favourites as described is doubtful.

James III was brought back to Edinburgh on 22 July 1482. There were now three clear factions in Scotland; Albany's party, the loyalists, and the Lauder mutineers. The Queen at Stirling with Prince James may also have had independent influence. A London merchant, George Cely, wrote a letter with exaggerated news of the campaign in July;

"the Dewke of Albany ys comyn ynto Ynglond and he has sworne to Kyngys good grace, and the King hasse sent hym ynto Scottland wyth 60,000 men yn iii battelles and many lordys of Ynglond wyth hym, ... Wythyn an monyth ther hasse ben about 44 townus and velagys brent en Scottlond and many lordys takyn and slayne, Donfryss ys brent."

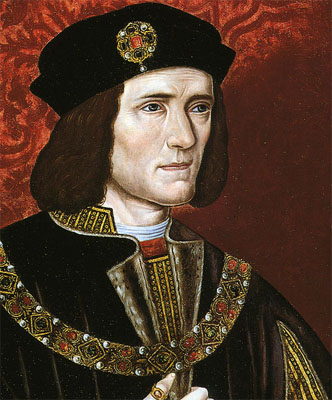
Richard, Duke of Gloucester marched on Edinburgh but was unable to put Albany on the throne

=== Richard, Duke of Gloucester at Edinburgh ===
At the beginning of August, Richard's army entered Edinburgh but he could not establish Albany as King. James III remained safe in Edinburgh Castle apparently as a prisoner of the lords who had mutinied at Lauder, although he had secretly contracted with the Keeper Lord Darnley and the garrison for his safety. Richard, not expecting to meet this coup d'état, did not have resources to besiege the castle.

As the details of the Fotheringhay treaty became known, vital Scottish support for Albany as king evaporated. Albany, his brother's party, and the keepers of the castle became reconciled. On 2 August 1482 Albany and Gloucester signed a bond with Colin, Earl of Argyll, Archbisbop Scheves, Lord Avandale, and the Bishop of Dunkeld which promised a pardon for Albany and the restoration of his previous dignities.

The English army made a truce on 4 August 1482 and withdrew with an undertaking from the town of Edinburgh to repay an advance on Cecilia's dowry which Edward had given to James III. The money had been paid as James III had previously promised his son Prince James would marry Cecilia. Albany was left to take possession of Edinburgh Castle and become for a time his brother's keeper. Gloucester left 1,700 men to assault Berwick Castle on 11 August and the castle was captured after a fortnight's siege.

Edward IV wrote to Pope Sixtus IV on 25 August describing the campaign in Scotland, explaining that Richard had spared all the citizens of Edinburgh, helped by the intercession of Albany, who was restored to his estates by the power of the English army. Edward explained that the taking of Berwick was the chief advantage he had gained. Berwick Castle, Edward writes, was taken on the army's return, not without slaughter and bloodshed. This letter was written before news of surrender of the castle could have reached him, according to the date 24 August given in the chronicles of Raphael Holinshed, John Lesley, and Edward Hall.

=== Siege of Edinburgh Castle ===
After Gloucester's departure, Albany seems from the chronicle stories to have looked for supporters for his faction, possibly including discussions with the Queen Margaret of Denmark at Stirling Castle, then besieged Edinburgh Castle. James III came out on 29 September 1482, but Lord Darnley, who had joined James's party, held it in defence till 7 October 1482.

The historian Norman Macdougall supposed that James III came out of the castle after Albany made a deal with his half-uncles and rebels at Lauder, John Stewart, Earl of Atholl and James Stewart, Earl of Buchan. James wrote an official letter to Lord Darnley on 19 October 1482 which confirmed that he was brought from Lauder and held in the castle against his will. The letter exonerated the garrison from any censure. Darnley, James III wrote, had made a compact with him for his safety, and held the castle against Albany's siege on James's orders.

=== Aftermath ===
For some months Albany remained powerful in Scotland, and on 11 December 1482, James III made him "Lieutenant-General of the realm" to defend the borders from English raids. When James III was restored to power, on 8 January 1483 he rewarded the Provost of Edinburgh Walter Bertrahame, who had underwritten the bond to repay Cecilia's dowry while the King was captive and warded in Edinburgh Castle, with a pension of £40. He also paid bills from July for minting an unpopular base-metal copper "black money" coinage and £214 for iron used for making serpentines and other guns, and arranged for the repayment of money seized from George Robison, the customs officer of Edinburgh, at Lauder.

Albany went to Dunbar Castle and renewed his treaty with Edward IV in February. The new treaty was made at Westminster by Henry Earl of Northumberland, John Lord Scrope and William Parr with the Earl of Angus, Andrew Lord Grey and James Liddale of Halkerston. This had the unintended effect of strengthening home support for his elder brother. Albany was forfeited as a traitor by the Parliament of Scotland in June, for making this new treaty, not for the events of the previous summer. After a period of exile, Albany joined with the Earl of Douglas in a new attempt at Scotland, which was defeated at the Battle of Lochmaben Fair.

Planned repairs to Berwick castle and town in 1483 were entrusted to Alexander Lee, a royal chaplain. The master carpenter of Berwick, George Porter, was ordered to build 120 houses in the town, with chambers, a hall, and a lodging in the castle. In England the boast "I was a captain when Barwycke was wonne" became a commonplace saying and was included in the Eton headmaster William Horman's 1519 Latin phrasebook Vulgaria as "Duxi ordinē qň Berwikũ venit in potestē."

== The Scottish chronicles and Berwick Castle ==
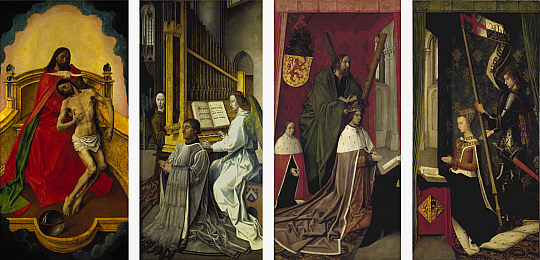
The Trinity Altarpiece shows from right, Margaret of Denmark facing James III with their son James, Duke of Rothesay, Royal Collection / National Gallery of Scotland

The sixteenth century Scottish chronicles present a differing story. All accounts emphasise the coinage of the "black metal" currency and its devaluation as major factor in the King's unpopularity at Lauder, along with his favouritism of non-noble upstarts. Robert Lindsay of Pitscottie, probably writing in the 1570s, misunderstands the Treaty of Fotheringhay and presents Albany as his brother's rescuer after the coup at Lauder Bridge, seeking English support at the King's request. After Gloucester comes to Edinburgh and James III is released, the royal brothers ride together from the Castle to Holyroodhouse. Then Pitscottie has the brothers and the Duke of Gloucester travel to Stirling and tour Scotland. This may represent Albany's labours to build his faction while James III remained in Edinburgh Castle after Gloucester's departure.

The idea that Albany brought an army to rescue his brother appears in the brief chronicle written by the Jedburgh monk Adam Abell in the 1530s. The historian Norman Macdougall supposed the sixteenth century writers were influenced by later stories which praised the Albany Stewarts and notes an apparently pro-Albany appendix to a manuscript of Andrew of Wyntoun's chronicle which omits Gloucester's invasion in 1482. Another early narrative, a 1492 Italian life of Margaret of Denmark, possibly informed by the recollections of a Scottish student at Bologna, merely states that James III was imprisoned for a time after a period of unsatisfactory rule with the consent of his wife and brother.

History which showed James III in a bad light and was positive about Albany may have been pleasing to the courtiers of James IV and Albany's son, John, Regent Albany. Macdougall calls this effect the "Albany legend," which combined with the parliamentary record published by Robert Lekprevik in 1566 shaped the writings of these historians in the 1570s. Other records such as the valuable "golden charter" on 16 November 1482 by which James III rewarded the town of Edinburgh with the customs duties of Leith contributed to this legend. The charter recorded the loyal and hearty services of the whole community of Edinburgh and Albany in freeing him from Edinburgh castle.

John Lesley, who knew of Alexander's pretension to be king in 1482, has Gloucester take Berwick on his return to England after vigorous defence by Sir Patrick Hepburn of Dunsyre, Lord Hailes, and significant English casualties. An addition to the English Croyland Chronicle also records that Berwick Castle was taken by Gloucester on his return after "vast slaughter and bloodshed," a phrase similar to that used by Edward IV in his letter to the Pope. George Buchanan has Albany at Lennoxlove camped with the English army in August and reconciled by the negotiation of Colin Campbell, Earl of Argyll, the Chancellor Andrew Stewart, and the Bishops of St Andrews and Dunblane. On 26 August 1482, according to Buchanan, Berwick Castle, still held by Scotland separately from the town, was surrendered by negotiation in Edinburgh to England.

The English writer Raphael Holinshed, who used Lesley as a source, understood that James III had gone to Lauder Bridge to meet his brother's invasion. He has Lord Stanley and Sir John Elrington, (the English war treasurer), holding Berwick town while Gloucester went forward to Edinburgh and camped at Restalrig and Lord Hailes defended Berwick Castle. Holinshed and Lesley mention an English navy in the Forth, not mentioned by other writers, although a record of its armament survives. Holinshed adds that after his reconciliation Albany sent an army south to aid Lord Hailes at Berwick which reached Lammermuir, and like Lesley simply says 24 August 1482 was the date that Patrick Hepburn yielded the castle, as Hepburn knew there was little hope of relief because of the dissension in Scotland.

=== The English chronicles: Hall (1542), Grafton (1569), Stow (1580) ===
The English chronicle of John Stow first published in 1580 adds more details. Edward IV, says Stow, invaded Scotland at Albany's request, "forgetting his oath," and borrowing £5,000 from the City of London. The sum is less than the 8,000 marks or £5,333 of Cecilia's dowry received by James III. The army mustered at Alnwick at the start of July. There were three "battles" as mentioned in George Cely's newsletter. The vanguard was commanded by the Earl of Northumberland with Lord Scrope of Bolton, Sir John Middleton, Sir John Ditchfield, and 6,700 soldiers. Gloucester formed the middle section, with Albany, Francis Lovell, Lord Greystock, Sir Edward Woodville, and 5,800 men. Lord Neville followed with 3,000; Thomas, Lord Stanley on the right of the Duke with 4,000; Lord Fitzhugh, Sir William Parr and Sir James Harrington on the left with 2,000; while 1,000 men guarded the carriage of the ordnance.

Stow and Richard Grafton called the keeper of Berwick Castle, Patrick Hepburn, "Earl of Bothwell," a title he acquired in October 1488. As Hepburn would not yield the castle, 4,000 troops were left to besiege it with Stanley, Parr, and the household treasurer, Sir John Elrington. On the way to Edinburgh the army burnt numerous towns and castles. Edward Hall's earlier Chronicle published in 1542 supplied the battle order and gave a list of some forty places burned by Gloucester en route and other places burned by the Earl of Northumberland (who carried out a parallel campaign in the borders) agreeing in number with Cely's newsletter. Richard Grafton in his Chronicle at Large published in 1569 has the same detail of the army as Hall, but like Cely states 44 towns were burnt. Much of Grafton's chronicle is taken from directly from Hall but his deviations are sometimes of interest.

Hall has nothing to say about Lauder, and wrote that James III voluntarily enclosed himself in Edinburgh Castle, which coincides with the detail of Lord Darnley's secret contract. Stow says the Scottish army lay at Haddington, and Albany was reconciled with the lords much as described by George Buchanan, and made "Lieutenant-General of Scotland," an appointment made or renewed in December.

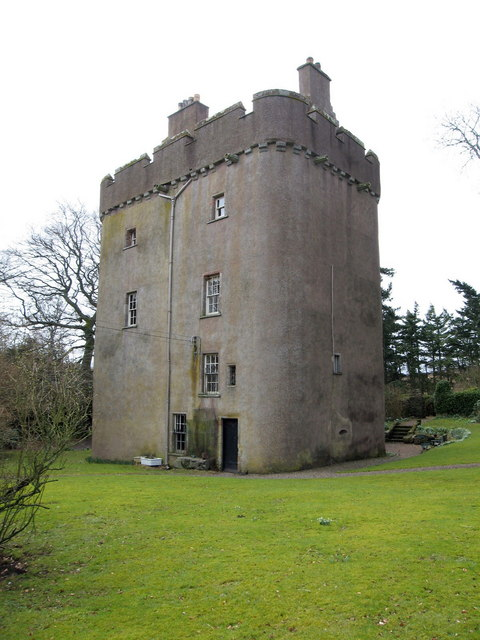
Edward Hall and John Lesley wrote that Albany mustered the Scottish army at Cranshaws Castle in the Lammermuir Hills to save Berwick Castle from his former allies

Hall's Chronicle has the army entering Edinburgh without any destruction at Albany's request, and issuing a public proclamation for James III in the castle, while the Scottish lords and army were at Haddington. After the reconciliation, Hall describes an indenture made at the English camp at Lennoxlove (Lethington), just south of Haddington, on 3 August 1482 between Albany and Gloucester wherein Albany promised to deliver on his treaty at Fotheringhay despite his new agreement.

Hall quotes the 4 August bond of the community of Edinburgh for the dowry repayment, Grafton has Albany direct the city of Edinburgh to make the bond after Berwick castle surrendered, but as in Hall, Grafton has the Garter Herald King at Arms return to Edinburgh on 23 October 1482 to request payment on the 4 August bond. The date is nearly correct; Edward IV decided to abandon the marriage plan and redeem the bond and the Garter herald John Writhe came to Edinburgh on 26 October. On the herald's return Duke of Gloucester withdrew from Newcastle to Sheriff Hutton. Hall and Grafton continue that Albany only now let James III out of the Castle, after having previously besieged him there, though records show James III was released earlier.

Soon after 4 August, in Hall's Chronicle, as in Holinshed and Lesley, as "Lieutenant-General of Scotland," Albany summoned the army to relieve Berwick Castle to meet on 8 August at Cranshaws on the way to Duns, but told Gloucester it was a pretence. Gloucester declared that if Albany opposed him at Berwick, he would defend the besiegers or die in the attempt. However, the council of Scotland was reluctant to fight and instead drafted a surrender of Berwick Castle by treaty in Edinburgh on 24 August 1482. When the document was sealed by both parties, which would be a couple of days later as Gloucester was now at Berwick or Alnwick, Berwick Castle was delivered straightaway, "incontinent," to Lord Stanley. It is possible either that the castle fell to Stanley before Albany's negotiations with the council were completed and agreed by Gloucester, as Edward IV's letter to the Pope may suggest, or that Edward IV anticipated the castle would be taken by force when he wrote.

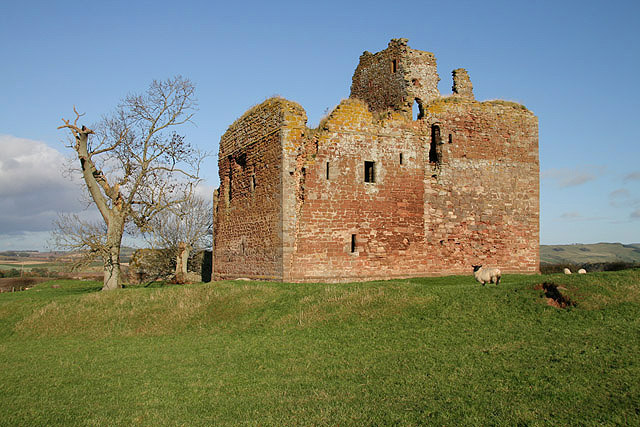
The Earl of Northumberland knighted his commanders at the mains of Cessford Castle on 22 August 1480 or 1482

Hall's 1542 chronicle, compiled using English historical materials, may be less affected by the "Albany legend" than the Scottish accounts and certainly shows Albany acting with duplicity, yet he concludes these events of 1482 with a lamentation of Albany's eventual fate, comparable with the Duke of Clarence, caused by the "prime envy" of James III against "his brother, the only organ and instrument by whom he obtained liberty and freedom," which seems at odds with his own account of the invasion.

Stow says when Berwick Castle was delivered to Stanley, Sir Thomas Molyneux of Haughton was knighted there as a banneret. Among the burnt places mentioned by Edward Hall, "Hooton" and "Heton Hall" must be the Hatton-Field, "Hoton feld besyde Berwyke" where Gloucester is said to have knighted Sir Ralph Assheton of Middleton as a banneret, and knighted Thomas, Lord Scrope of Masham and 26 others. These knights were made on 22 August 1482, about the time of the surrender of Berwick Castle, and so Richard seems to have travelled back from Newcastle. The Earl of Northumberland is said to have knighted 18 men at the "mayne of Sefford," Cessford in the Scottish Middle-march, during a previous campaign, on 22 August 1480, or at the same time. A grand total of 70 knights and bannerets including Molyneux and Edward Stanley were made on 24 August which seems to mark the end of hostilities. The occasion on the 22 August may have prompted Edward's letter to the Pope.

Stow concludes with the Duke of Gloucester returned to Sheriff Hutton and Edward IV rewarding the Mayor of London, William "Harriot," and some of aldermen of the city with a feast and hunting at Waltham Forest. The feast appears in other chronicles of Edward IV as an example of his princely largesse, not connected with the Scottish expedition: the city loan of 5000 marks but not the Scottish expedition is mentioned under the year 1482 in Fabyan's chronicle. Stow's description of a city loan and reward are corroborated by surviving documents; Edward IV's Garter King of Arms gave the bond from Edinburgh to William Heryot, Mayor of London on 11 October 1482. Garter went to Edinburgh and contracted its payment with the city in the porch of St Giles' Church on 27 October 1482.
