= List of listed buildings in Cranshaws, Scottish Borders =

This is a list of listed buildings in the parish of Cranshaws in the Scottish Borders, Scotland.

== List ==
Name	Location	Date Listed	Grid Ref. (Note: Sometimes known as OSGB36, the grid reference (where provided) is based on the British national grid reference system used by the Ordnance Survey. • "Guide to National Grid". Ordnance Survey. • "Get-a-map". Ordnance Survey.)	Geo-coordinates	Notes	LB Number (Note: Historic Environment Scotland assign a unique alphanumeric identifier to each designated site in Scotland, for listed buildings this always begins with "LB", for example "LB12345".)	Image
Smiddyhill Bridge				55°50′36″N 2°29′10″W	Category B	206	Upload Photo
Cranshaws Farmhouse Including Sundial				55°50′52″N 2°30′35″W	Category C(S)	44908	Upload Photo
Cranshaws Castle Including Sundial, Covered Well And Garden Walls				55°50′55″N 2°30′35″W	Category A	4093	Upload another image See more images
Cranshaws Manse Including Outbuildings And Garden Walls, Boundary Wall, Gatepiers And Gates				55°50′58″N 2°29′38″W	Category C(S)	44909	Upload another image
Ellemford Bridge				55°49′58″N 2°26′03″W	Category B	205	Upload Photo
Cranshaws Farm, Gateway To Stable Courtyard Including Gates And Pal Stone				55°50′55″N 2°30′31″W	Category B	44906	Upload Photo
Cranshaws Farm, Stable Courtyard				55°50′55″N 2°30′33″W	Category C(S)	44907	Upload Photo
Broombank				55°49′53″N 2°28′06″W	Category C(S)	44905	Upload Photo
Cranshaws Church (Church Of Scotland) Including Graveyard, Gatepiers And Gates				55°50′56″N 2°29′35″W	Category A	201	Upload another image See more images
Cranshaws Schoolhouse Including Boundary Wall And Gatepiers				55°51′05″N 2°29′43″W	Category B	44910	Upload Photo

== Key ==
The scheme for classifying buildings in Scotland is:

- Category A: "buildings of national or international importance, either architectural or historic; or fine, little-altered examples of some particular period, style or building type."
- Category B: "buildings of regional or more than local importance; or major examples of some particular period, style or building type, which may have been altered."
- Category C: "buildings of local importance; lesser examples of any period, style, or building type, as originally constructed or moderately altered; and simple traditional buildings which group well with other listed buildings."

In March 2016 there were 47,288 listed buildings in Scotland. Of these, 8% were Category A, and 50% were Category B, with the remaining 42% being Category C.
