= Younger's Brewery =

Brewery in Edinburgh

William Younger & Company
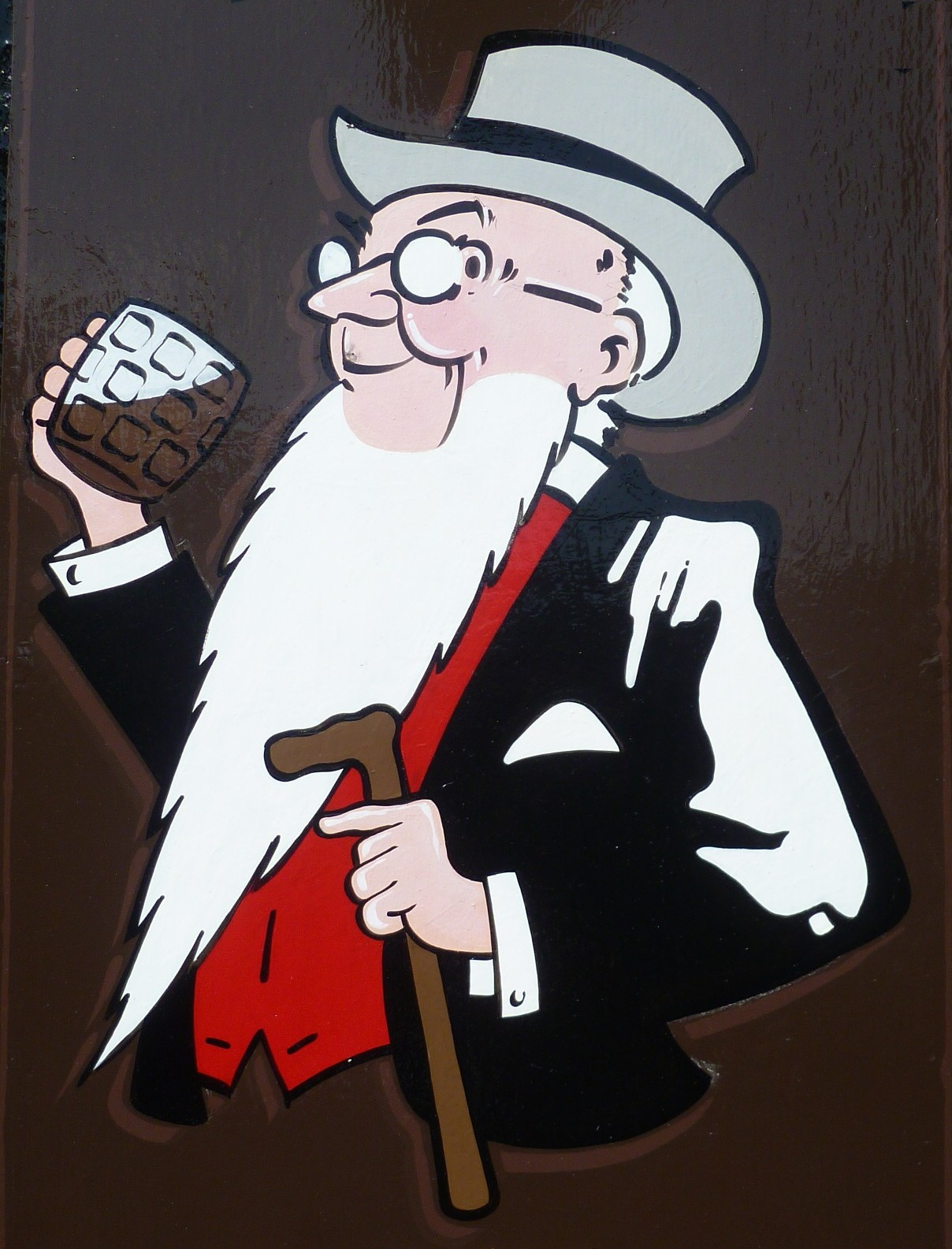
- Type: Brewing company
- Industry: Alcoholic drink
- Founded: 1778
- Founder: Archibald Campbell Younger
- Successor: Scottish Brewers
- Headquarters: Edinburgh, Scotland
- Products: Beer
- Owner: Marston's Brewery

Younger's Brewery (William Younger & Company) was a brewery in Edinburgh. Established in 1749, it became one of the city’s main commercial enterprises, supplying domestic and foreign markets.

In 1931 Younger's merged with McEwan’s to form Scottish Brewers, which in turn merged with Newcastle Breweries in 1960 to form Scottish & Newcastle. By the late 1960s the combine employed the largest single workforce in the city.

The company’s UK operations were taken over by Heineken in 2008. In October 2011 the Bedford-based Wells & Young's Brewery announced that it had purchased the Younger's and McEwan's brands from Heineken UK.

== Younger family ==
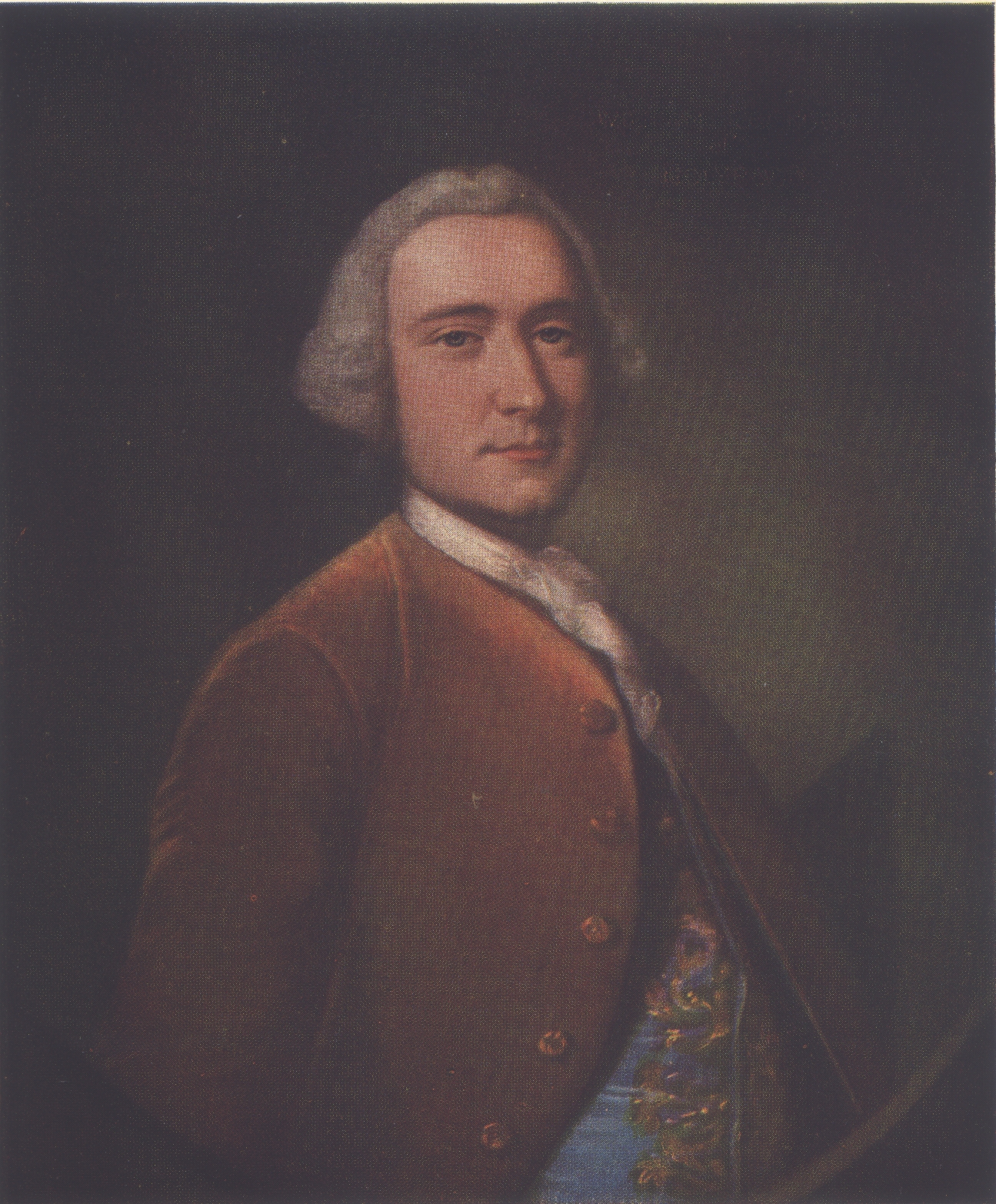
William Younger (1733–1769)

The Younger family home was in the village of Linton (now West Linton), Peeblesshire, where their house still stands. Younger’s father was a farmer, vintner and bailie. The surname may be of Dutch or Flemish origin (possibly from Yonckeers). A William Younger of Flemish extraction is recorded in a Berwickshire legal document of 1515, and a John Younger of Cockburnspath, Berwickshire was accused of cattle-stealing in 1559.

The first Younger recorded at Linton is Thomas Younger, whose will, dated 17 February 1597, is held by Register House in Edinburgh. One family member was a Commissioner of Militia for Peeblesshire in the reign of Charles II. Others were elders of the Kirk in the reign of William II and one, around 1700, was a Writer to the Signet.

In 1749, William Younger left home for Edinburgh, aged 16, and whilst it is often speculated that he found employment in Robert Anderson's brewhouse in Leith, there is no documentary evidence for this. In 1753 he met his future wife Grizel Cochrane Syme, who was also from Linton. Thanks to her family connections (Thomas Cochrane, 8th Earl of Dundonald, was a Commissioner of Excise), it appears that before their marriage William became an exciseman. As second watchman at the new Leith Glass Works, he oversaw the collection of Government duty on manufactured bottles. When his father died in 1755, he inherited a share of the family’s wealth, and this, together with his exciseman’s salary of £25 per annum, enabled him to marry. A year later, he was promoted at the age of twenty-five to be one of the "Excise Surveyors of Edinburgh and precincts" on a salary of £60 per annum.

As his personal wealth increased in the 1760s, Younger bought land, a house, a share in a ship, a co-partnership in a stage coach company and a share in brewery premises near the Kirkgate, Leith. In 1768 he increased the storage facilities for the brewery by purchasing seven large cellars, two dwelling houses and a large warehouse in Broad Wynd. Shortly thereafter he joined three friends in taking over the Edinburgh-Leith stage coach company. He also bought a part share in a brig on the London-Leith run, named William of Leith which also carried cargo as far afield as Hamburg and Danzig. Overworked and ill by the end of 1769, Younger died on 5 May of that year. His widow Grizel married Leith brewer Alexander Anderson and continued to brew under the name Grizel Younger Anderson until 1794.

== Family firm ==
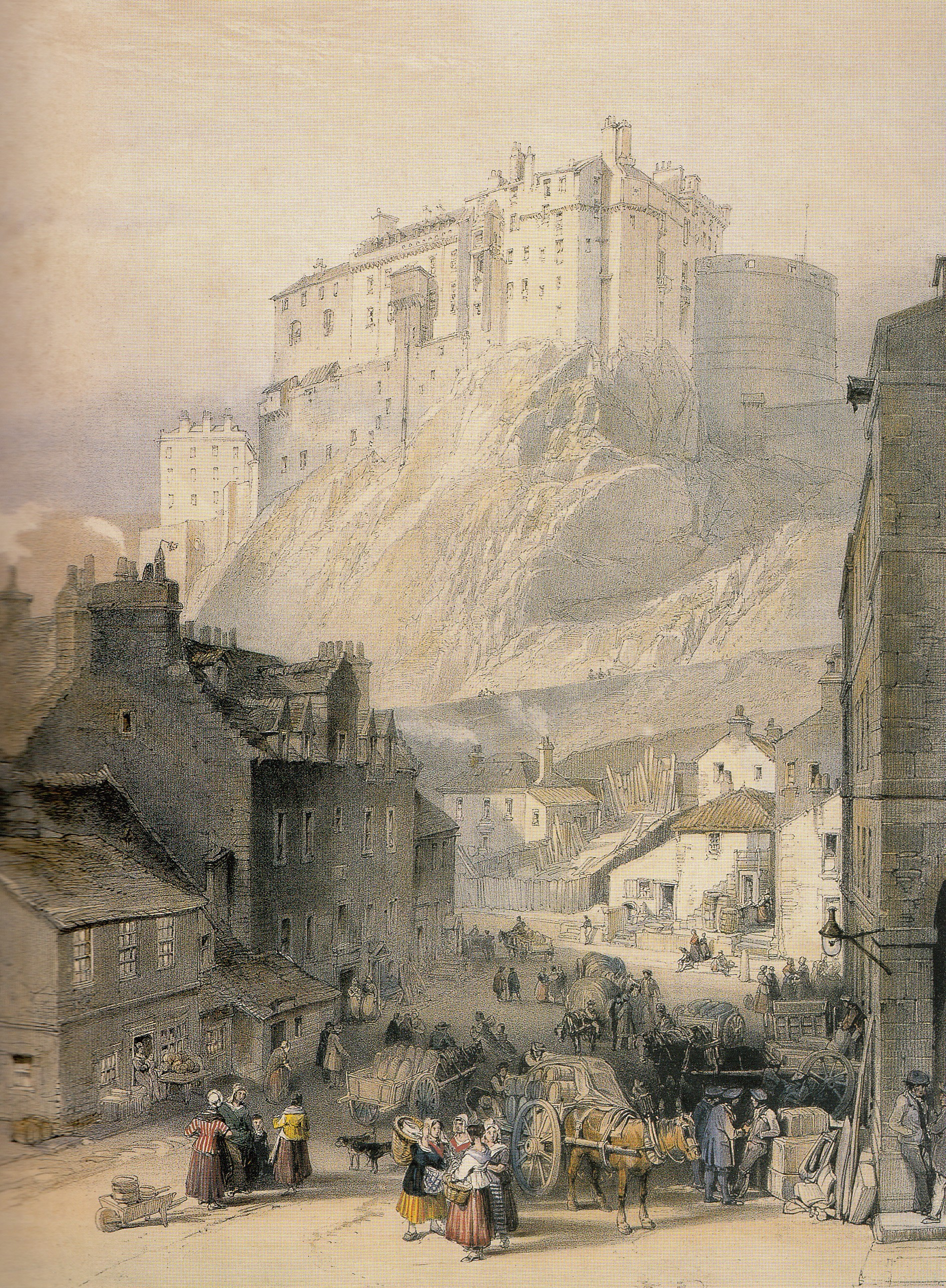
The Grassmarket, Edinburgh by W L Leitch (featuring a beer cart)

In 1778 one of Younger’s sons, Archibald Campbell Younger, having served his apprenticeship under Anderson, established his own brewery within the precincts of the Abbey of Holyroodhouse at Croft-an'-Righ. This began an association of the area with brewing which lasted until demolition of the Abbey Brewery in the 1990s. The move made good business sense, because at that time several hundred people lived within the Abbey sanctuary and ale brewed there escaped the two pennies Scots custom levied by Edinburgh Town Council after 1693 on every pint brewed within the town walls. Younger’s strong ale was sold in the taverns of the High Street, the Cowgate and the Grassmarket in Edinburgh’s Old Town. Robert Chambers, in his Traditions of Edinburgh, writes of Johnnie Dowie’s Tavern in Libberton's Wynd (swept away by the creation of George IV Bridge), "Johnnie Dowie’s was chiefly celebrated for ale – Younger’s Edinburgh ale – a potent fluid which almost glued the lips of the drinker together, and of which few, therefore, could despatch more than a bottle".

In 1786 Younger acquired a second, larger brewery at Croft-an-Righ, an ancient lane bordering the eastern precinct wall of the Abbey. In 1793 he opened new and even larger premises in the North Back Canongate (now Calton Road) on a site that disappeared later with the building of Waverley Station. The new brewery had two malt floors, each a hundred feet long, a spring water well, and ten tuns each capable of brewing thirty barrels.

== 19th-century growth ==
Meanwhile, another of William Younger’s sons, William II, had started his own brewhouse within the Abbey precincts and had begun penetrating the London market. In the Morning Post Gazetter of 19 May 1802 his London agent reported the arrival of "Mr. William Younger’s much admired ALE, in casks and bottles, which, being carefully selected by himself from the stock of that famous brewer, will be found on trial to surpass in strength and flavour any ever offered to sale in London".

In 1803 William moved premises after buying an existing brewhouse, malt barn, kiln house, stables and dwelling house in the narrow lane between the Canongate and the Abbey known as Horse Wynd. In The Beauties of Scotland, Robert Forsyth stated that "The ale which has acquired the highest reputation, and is now bought up with great avidity in London and other distant markets, is that prepared by two brothers who carry on business separately, Messrs Younger". In 1806, however, Archibald and William collaborated in producing a London-style porter for the Scottish market which was sold under the name of A.C. and W. Younger.

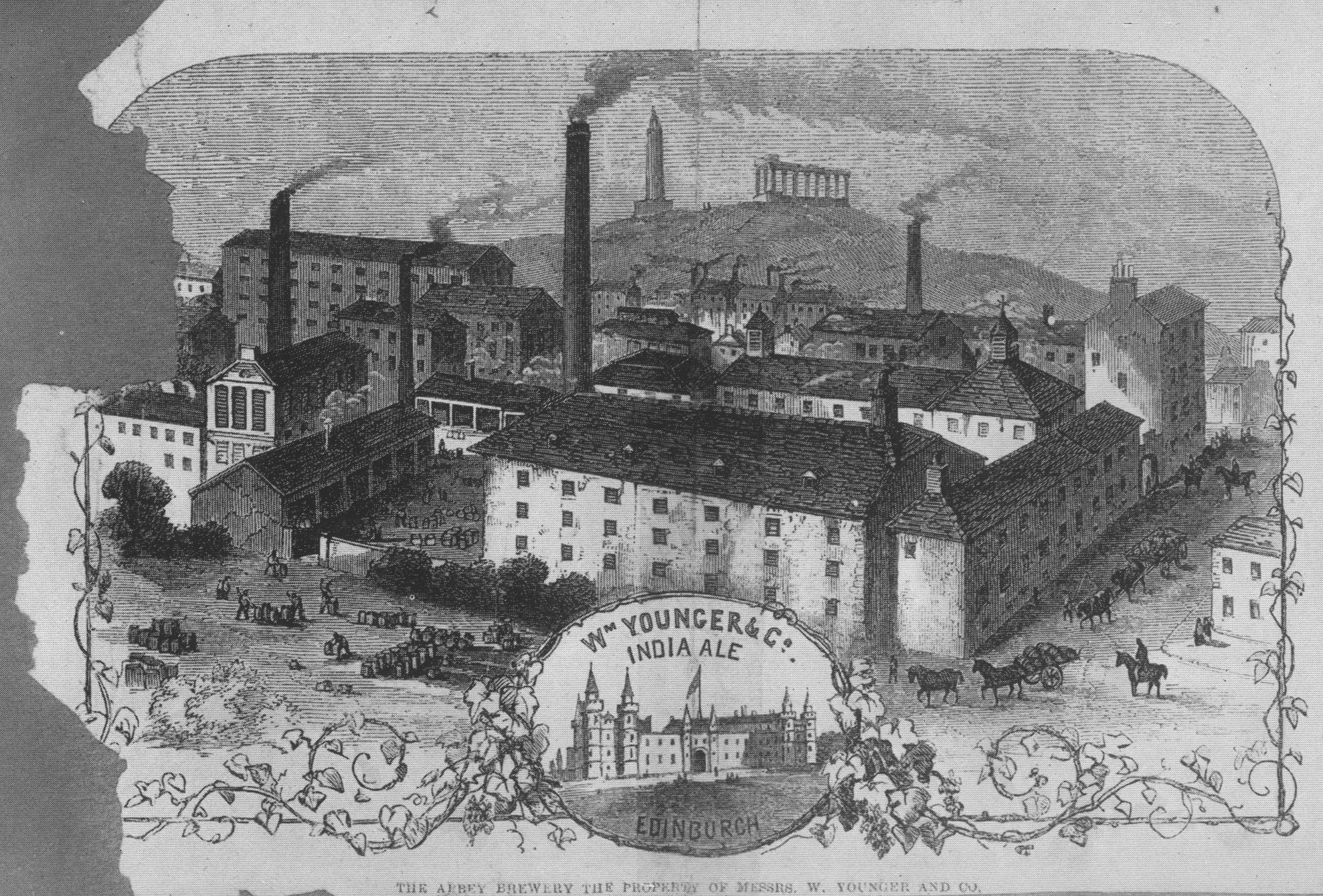
The Abbey Brewery in the Canongate

After Archibald died, aged 62, in 1819, William, now 52, arranged the sale of his brother’s brewery and in 1825 expanded his own by purchasing property on the opposite side of Horse Wynd for £5,000. This, together with neighbouring ground acquired in 1829, was the site which developed into the Abbey Brewery, with which the name Younger’s would become chiefly associated. By the 1830s Younger’s ales were being sold all over Scotland, the north east of England and London. By the time of his death in 1842 William had joined forces with fellow brewer, Alexander Smith, and was exporting Scotch ales to New York and St. Louis in the United States, as well as Britain’s overseas colonies.

After William II’s death, his son William III and Smith’s son, Andrew, expanded the business as partners in the 1840s, concentrating particularly on the North American market while also sending hogsheads on clippers bound for Bombay and Adelaide. William II’s grandson, William IV, joined the business at this stage as it continued to prosper. He took over running the firm with Smith after William III died in 1854. During the Crimean War the company won a lucrative government contract to supply beer to the army. By 1856 San Francisco was receiving regular shipments, and in the following year Philadelphia, Montreal, Baltimore and New Orleans joined the rapidly growing list of new markets, as did the Caribbean islands, Buenos Aires and even Honolulu.

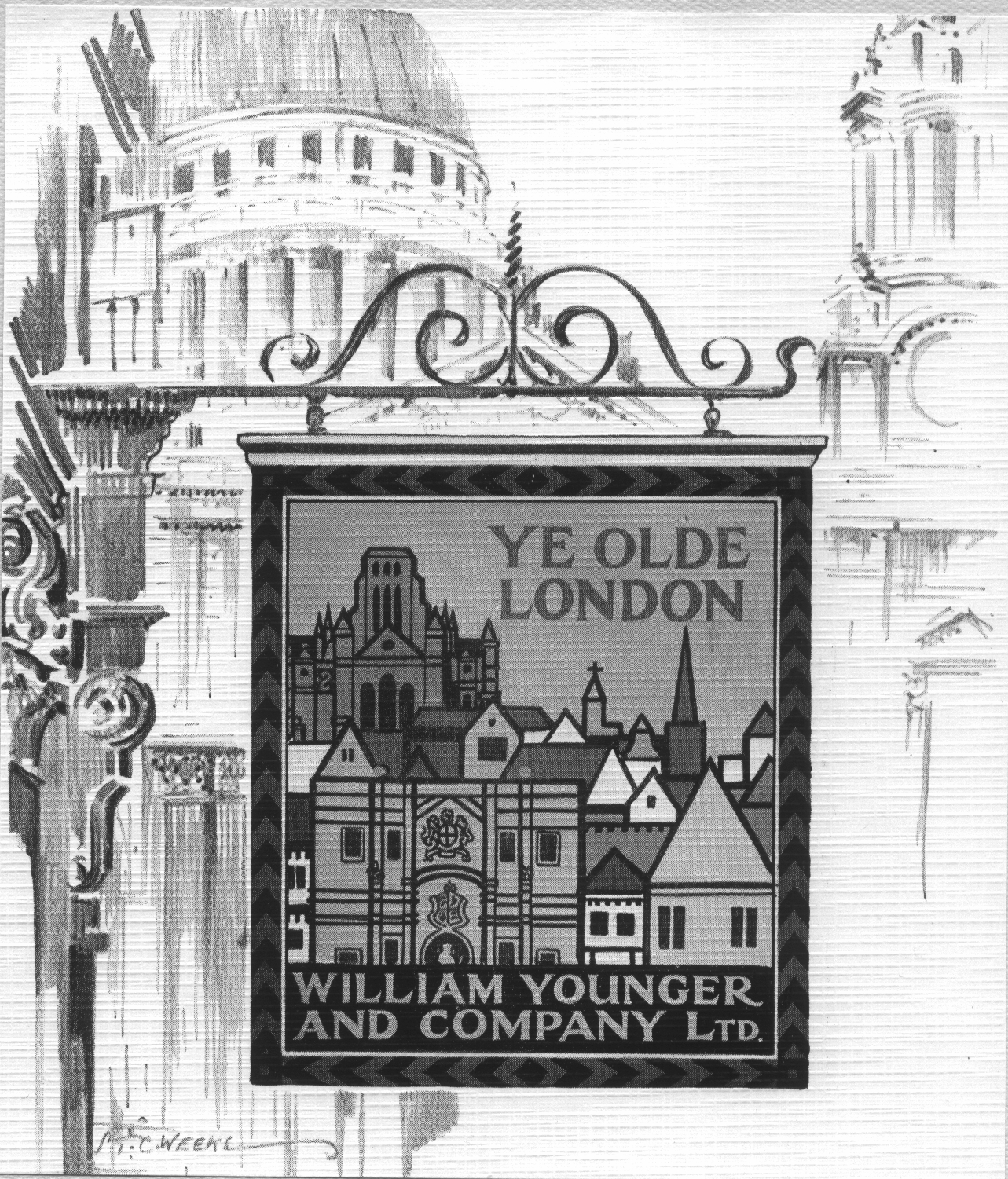
Pub sign on one of Younger's former London pubs

In 1858 the Abbey Brewery began to expand following the acquisition of adjacent brewery premises and, a little later, Brodie’s Land further up the Canongate. This was the area between the Canongate and the South Back Canongate (now Holyrood Road) which was developed as the Holyrood Brewery. New storage was also built at Park Stores, Abbeyhill next to the old Croft-an-Righ site. At about the same time, the premises on the Palace side of Horse Wynd were abandoned to become royal property on the initiative of Prince Albert. The company opened its London branch office at St. Paul’s Wharf, Upper Thames Street in 1861. By the 1930s the firm had acquired a number of traditional pubs in the London area, styled "Scotch Houses", including Ye Olde London on Ludgate Hill, which began life as the London Coffee House in 1731. The London branch moved eventually to Princes Wharf, Commercial Road, Lambeth, in 1932 and was sold off in the 1970s to make way for part of the South Bank Development.

In 1869 both Younger and Smith retired from the business, passing control to three partners: William III’s younger sons, Henry and David, and Smith’s son Alexander. William IV died in 1886.

== 20th-century developments ==
By the beginning of the 20th century it was reckoned that Younger’s was producing a quarter of all Scotland's beer. The company’s overseas trade had grown so rapidly that 80,000 barrels a year were leaving the London stores alone for sixty overseas-based agencies. Cargoes were being carried from Leith to Belgium which became a principal market; private customers included the Czar of Russia and his household; and deliveries were finding their way across the world to destinations ranging alphabetically from Alexandria to Zanzibar.

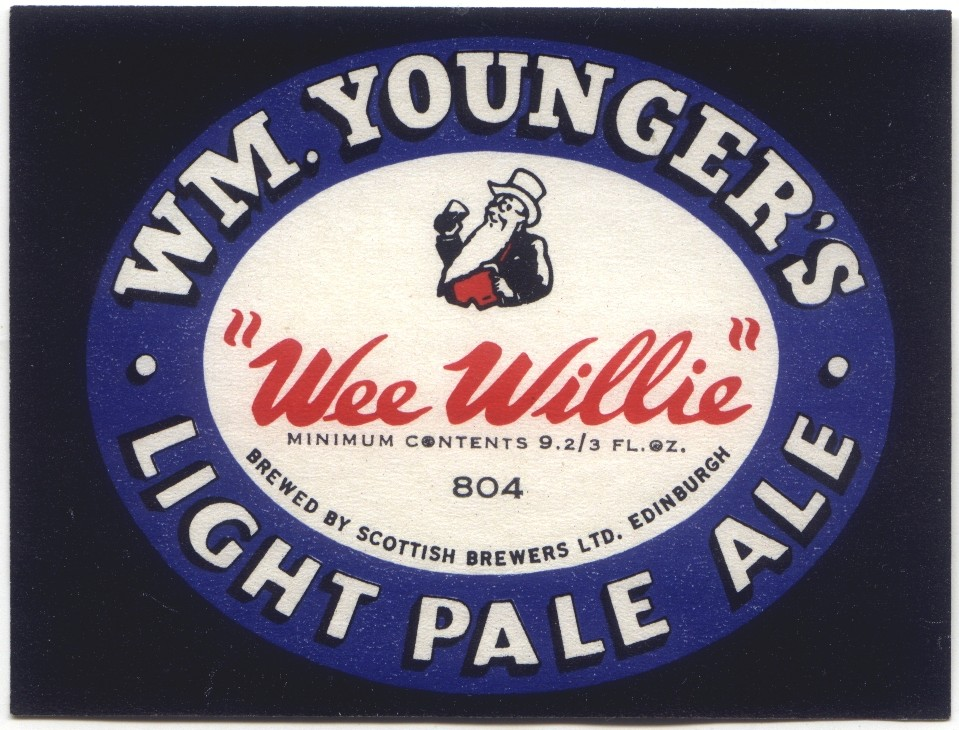
'Father William' on a Scottish Brewers' beer label

Growth continued throughout the Great War, and in 1920 the firm installed its first bottling plant for new fashioned chilled and carbonated beers in the Holyrood Brewery. Scotch Ale, Nos.1, 2 and 3 (resembling English Burton ales) began to rival India Pale Ale in popularity. Alfred Leete’s ‘Father William’ trade mark appeared for the first time at the end of the 1920s.

Despite its healthy level of authorised capital and dividends, the onset of the Depression in 1930 induced the board to propose a merger of the company with its great Edinburgh rival McEwan’s to form a new combine to be known as Scottish Brewers Ltd. with effect from 6 December 1931. While both companies continued to produce their own ales marketed under their own names, they now shared financial and technical resources; and exports were handled by a new company, McEwan-Younger Ltd. From 1951 to 1970 this fell under the Directorship of Stenhard Landale FRSE.

Scottish Brewers continued to increase its market share in the brewing sector, doubling its output after a costly five-year programme of expansion and modernisation undertaken between 1958 and 1963. The company eventually merged with Newcastle's Tyne Brewery in 1960 to form Scottish & Newcastle Ltd., a giant of the British brewing industry until its joint takeover by Carlsberg and Heineken group, in 2008. Heineken acquired the British business. The Abbey Brewery had closed in 1956 to be redeveloped as the Head Office of Scottish & Newcastle. The Holyrood Brewery closed in 1986. Both sites are now occupied by the buildings of the devolved Scottish Parliament.

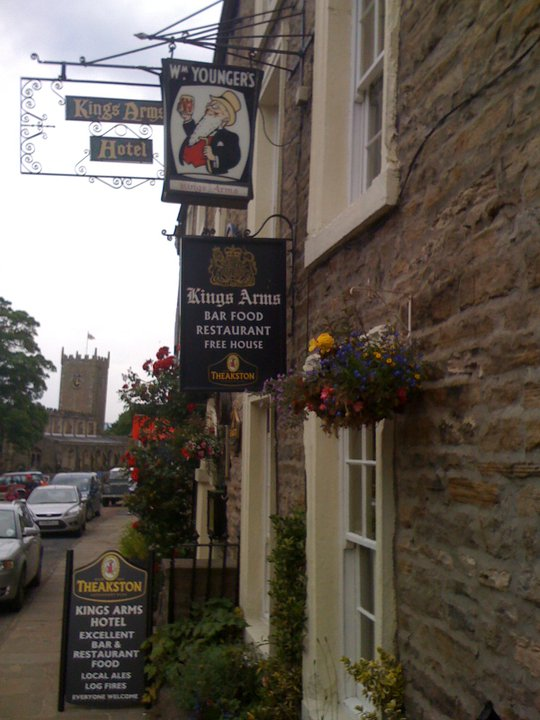
A W. M. Youngers sign hanging outside the Kings Arms Hotel in Askrigg, North Yorkshire, which became the Drovers Arms in the BBC television series All Creatures Great and Small

== 21st-century developments ==
In late 2011, the Younger and McEwans brands were sold by Heineken to Wells and Young's. In May 2017, the brands and were sold by Charles Wells Ltd to Marston's as part of a bigger deal which included the Eagle Brewery.

== See also ==
- Beer in Scotland
