= John Dowie's Tavern =

Scottish tavern

Coordinates: 55°56′57″N 3°11′32″W

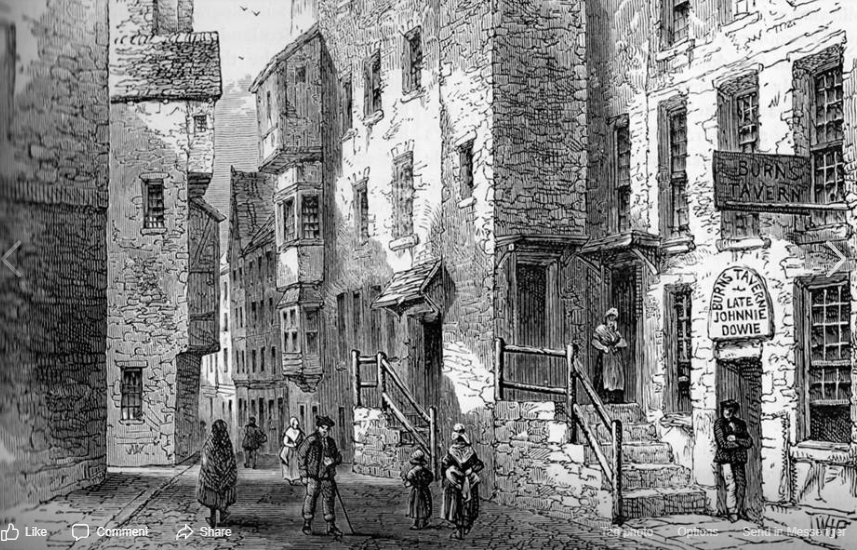
John Dowie's Tavern

John Dowie's Tavern was an 18th/19th century tavern in Libberton's Wynd in Edinburgh, Scotland, frequented by a number of well-known persons. Its proximity to the Edinburgh law courts also meant it was a haunt of Edinburgh lawyers and judges.

== History ==
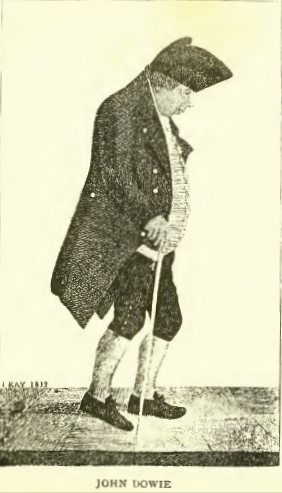
John Dowie as illustrated by John Kay

John Dowie took over a tavern named "The Mermaid" on Liberton Wynd, off Edinburgh's Royal Mile, close to the Law Courts and St Giles Cathedral around 1770. The building held a date-stone of 1728 over the entrance. Dowie was a convivial host, and despite the small rooms and lack of daylight, it was a popular place, due to both Dowie himself and the quality of the beers. Liberton Wynd was a steep and narrow alley leading from the High Street to the Cowgate. The beer was from Archibald Younger's brewery at Croft-an'-Righ.

The south wall of the tavern was defined by the King's Wall, one of the early city town walls.

Edinburgh Ale was supplied to the tavern by Archibald Younger from the Croft-an-Righ Brewery near Holyrood Abbey (which was set up in 1777). The tavern also sold food such as Nor' Loch trout, Welsh rabbit and "puffed herring" (bloater). It was open from around 10am until midnight.

The largest room in the tavern held around 14 people. The smallest space, known as "the coffin", held four, or six at a squeeze, and was the favourite space of Burns.

In 1806, the poem "Johnnie Dowie's Ale" was published, raising the fame of the tavern.

Following the death of John Dowie at 13 Libberton Wynd in 1817, the tavern was renamed the Burns Tavern due to its connection to Robert Burns.

Dowie left around £6,000 in his will (the equivalent of £525,000 in 2020). He was survived by his second wife and the children from his first marriage.

It was demolished (together with all of Liberton Wynd) to create George IV Bridge, which began construction in 1827. It is thought the tavern was one of the last buildings demolished for the project, around 1836. Although some records state the tavern was demolished in 1881, this appears to relate to a second Burns Tavern, possibly built by the owner of the first.

== Family ==
Dowie was twice married and had several children by his first wife: Captain James Dowie of 10 South James St; William Dowie a vintner at 6 East Register St and Charles Dowie a grocer at 18 Candlemaker Row.

== Known clientele ==
The following are known to have visited the tavern:

- Robert Fergusson
- Robert Burns
- Henry Mackenzie
- David Herd
- James Cummyng, Lord Lyon
- George Paton
- David Hunter of Blackness
- Anthony Woodhead
- George Martin
- William Nicol, headmaster of the High School
- Allan Masterton

== The College of Dowie ==
This was a "club" which met in the tavern in the last decade of the 18th century. Members included:

- Archibald Younger, the brewer
- John Gray, the City Clerk
- John Buchan WS
- David Martin, the artist
- Henry Raeburn
