= Stenhard Landale =

British businessman

Stenhard Ernest Andrew Landale OBE JP MIEE (1905–1977) was a British businessman, with a background in electrical engineering and agriculture. He served as Director of William Younger & Co, brewers from 1950 to 1971. He established the company Landale Farms Limited in Scotland. In business he is often referred to as S. E. A. Landale.

== Life ==
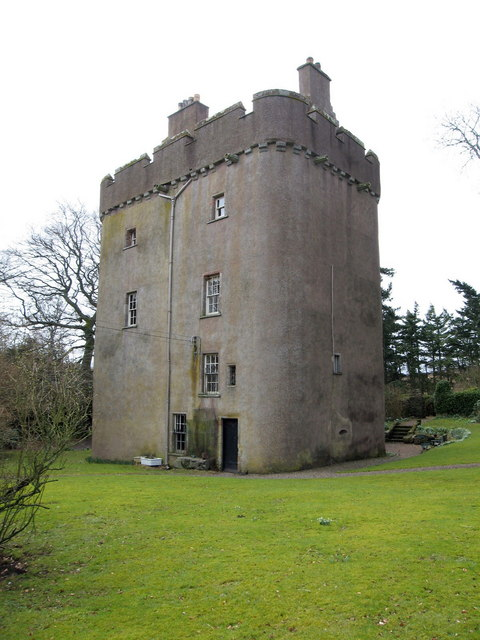
Cranshaws Castle

He trained as an electrical engineer at Faraday House in London and after some training at Bruce Peebles & Co. Ltd. he worked at the Wireless Research facility at Cambridge from 1930 to 1932 on the design staff of Marconi’s International Marine Company. In 1931 he inherited the impressive property of Cranshaws Castle in Berwickshire together with the estate of Whitchester nearby.

He began lecturing in Engineering Science at Oxford University in 1932. In 1935 he moved to William Younger & Co, brewers in Edinburgh as their Technical Director, becoming a full Director in 1951. In 1939 he was elected a Fellow of the Royal Society of Edinburgh. His proposers were James Pickering Kendall, James Cameron Smail, Maurice Say and C. T. R. Wilson.

In the Second World War he served as Superintendent Scientist overseeing Radar for the Admiralty. He was created an Officer of the Order of the British Empire in 1944 for his services.

He died at his home at Whitchester in rural Berwickshire and is buried in the churchyard at Duns.

== Family ==
He was married to Eileen Landale.
