= Libberton's Wynd =

Street in Edinburgh, Scotland

Coordinates: 55.9493°N 3.1921°W

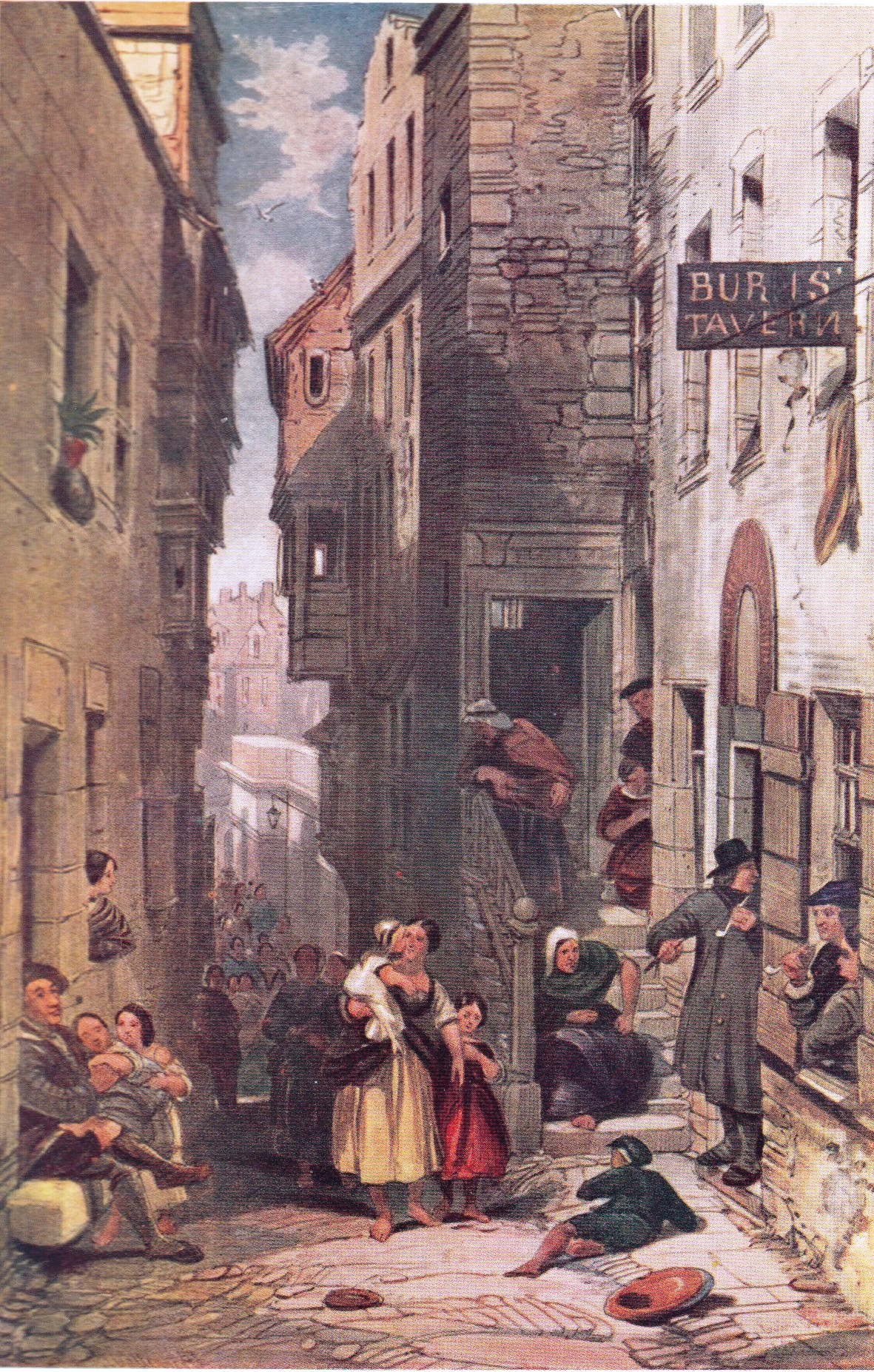
Dowie's Tavern, Libberton's Wynd

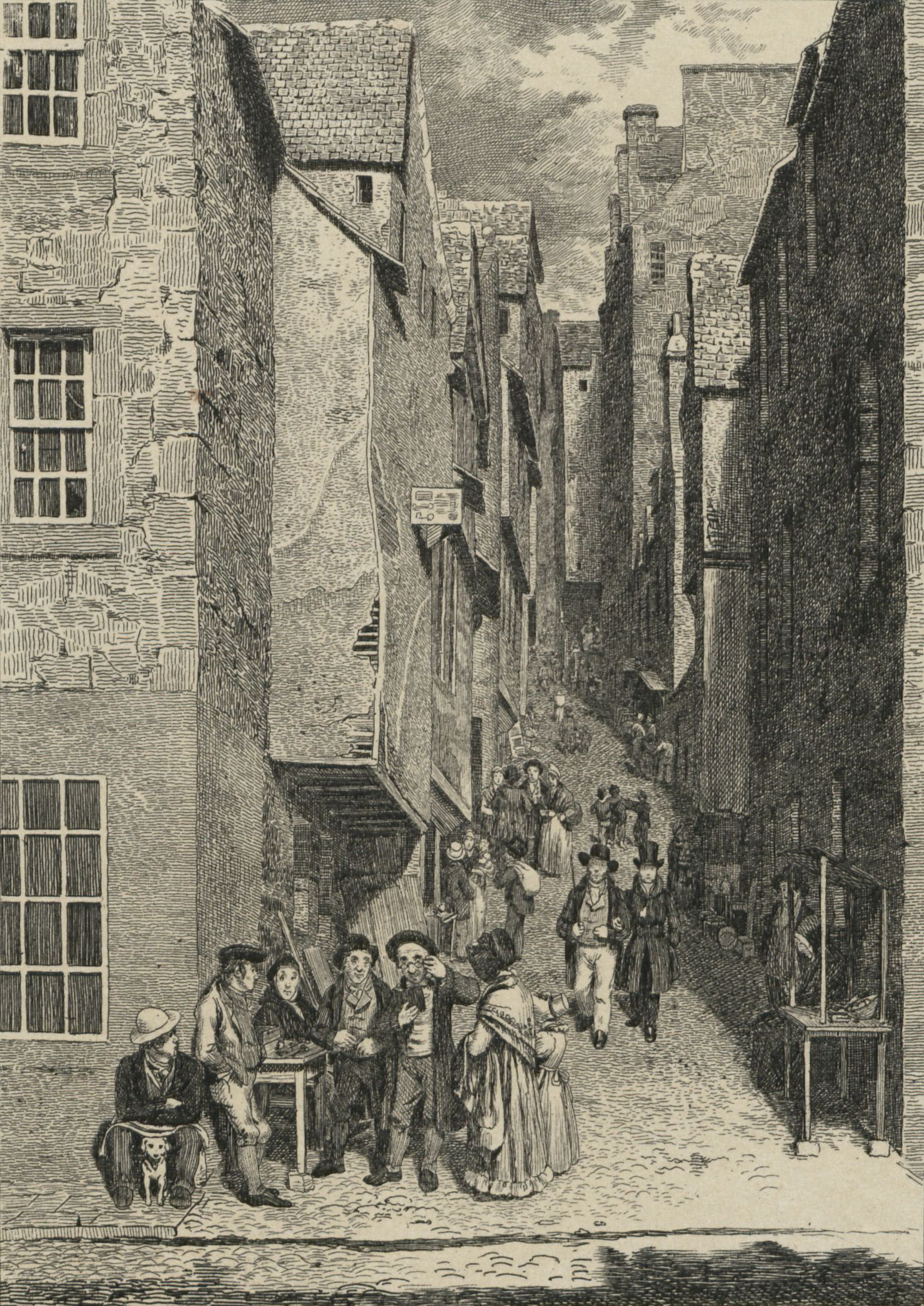
A view of Libberton's Wynd from the Cowgate

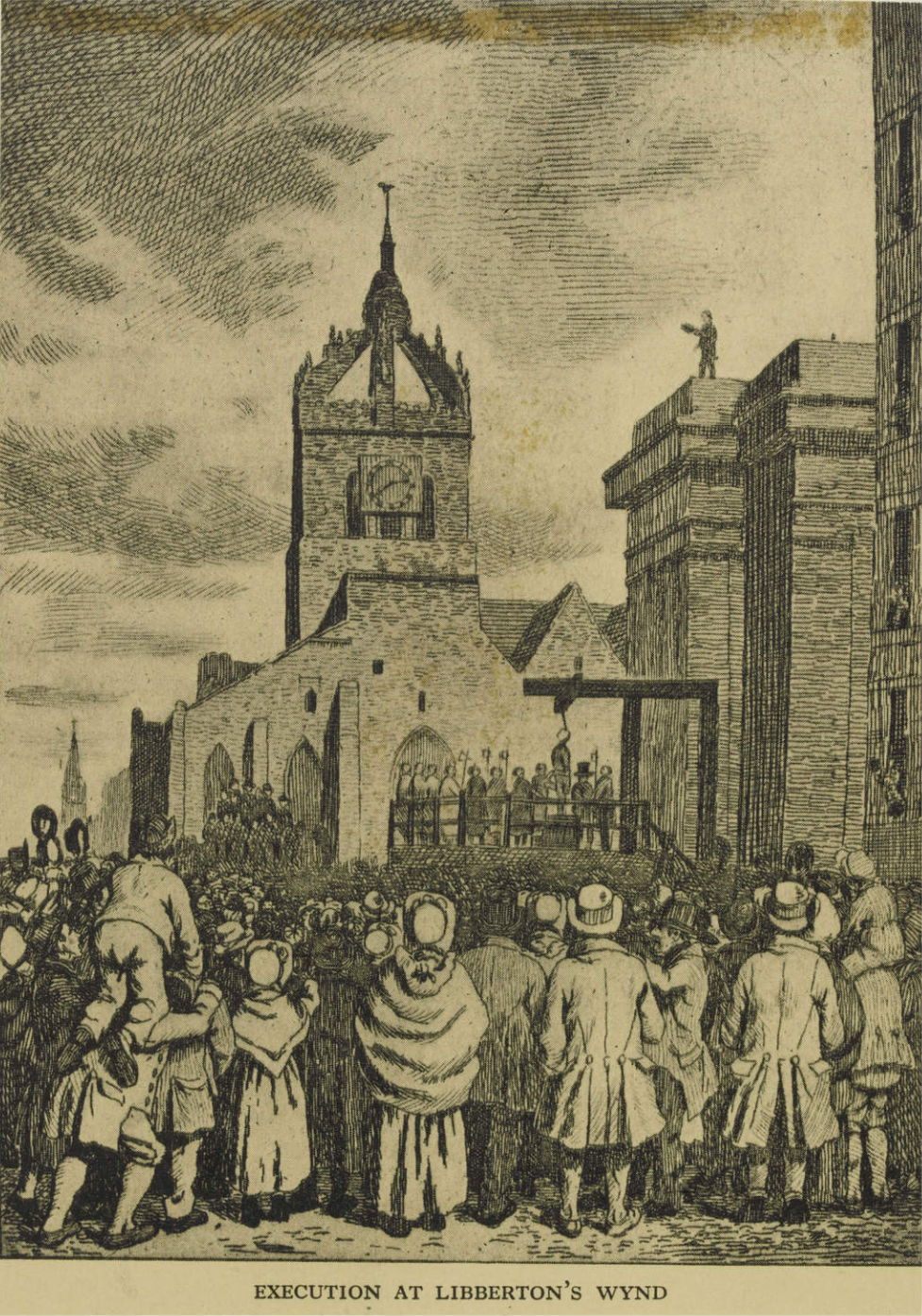
An execution at Libberton's Wynd

Libberton's Wynd was a steep narrow street in Edinburgh, running from Lawnmarket to Cowgate. The term "wynd" is a common Scottish term for a narrow lane between houses.

While most of it was destroyed in the 19th century as part of the creation of the George IV Bridge, a part of the wynd has been rediscovered below the National Library of Scotland.

John Dowie's Tavern was a famous tavern in the street, run by John Dowie from c.1770 to 1817. Although small, it was very popular, and frequented by Edinburgh's respectable citizens.

The street was also known as a site for executions, including that of the notorious body-snatcher William Burke.
