= George IV Bridge =

Road bridge in Edinburgh, Scotland

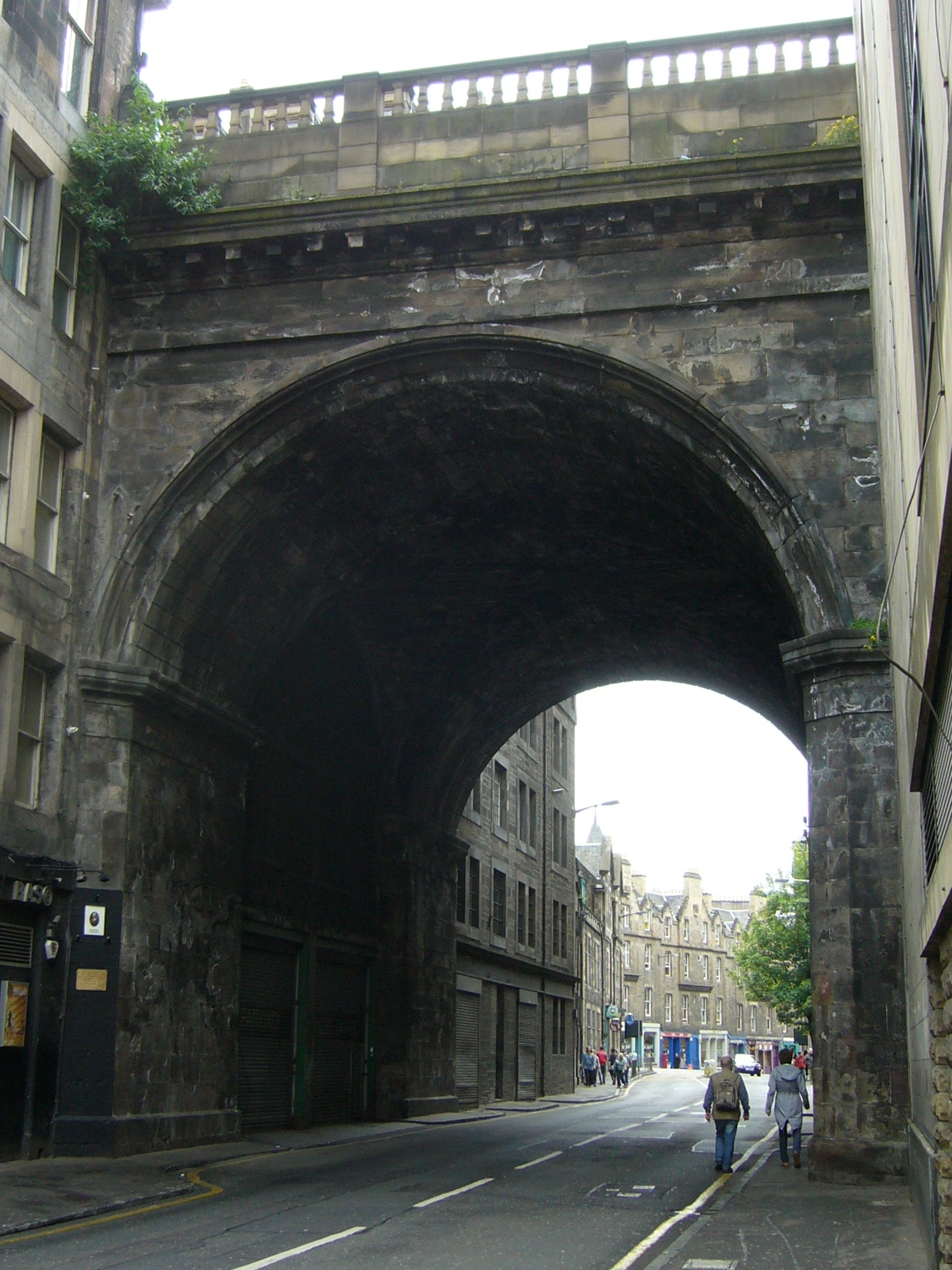
- An exposed arch of the bridge
- Coordinates: 55.94733°N 3.19171°W
- OS grid reference: NT 25673 73341
- Locale: Edinburgh
- Named for: George IV

Characteristics
- Design: Arch
- Material: Stone

Listed Building – Category A
- Official name: 26 George Iv Bridge, Frankenstein Pub (former Elim Pentecostal Church)
- Designated: 28 April 1977
- Reference no.: LB26862

Location
- Interactive map of George IV Bridge

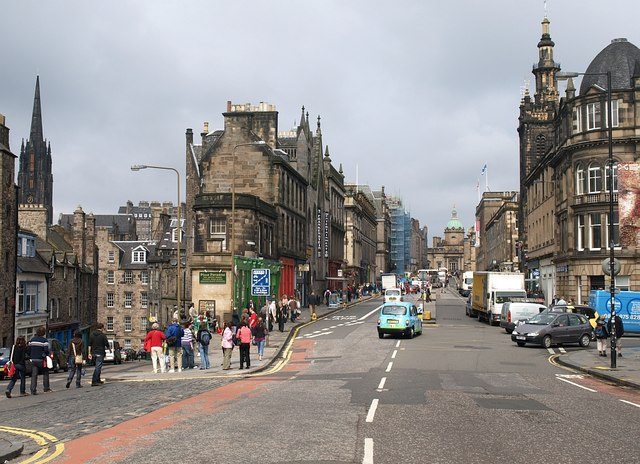
George IV Bridge, looking north towards the Royal Mile and, beyond, the coppered dome of the headquarters of the Bank of Scotland. The junction with Chambers Street is to the right and the crowd on the left surround the statue of Greyfriars Bobby.

George IV Bridge is an elevated street in Edinburgh, Scotland, and is home to a number of the city's important public buildings.

== History ==
A bridge connecting the High Street to the south was first suggested in 1817, but was originally planned further west and was non-linear and complicated. Plans developed through the early 1820s, concluding in 1825 that a linear form aligned with Bank Street (which connects to The Mound and Princes Street) was more logical, even though this required greater destruction of existing buildings. This would be a bridge over the Cowgate and Merchant Street. The foundation stone was laid on 15 August 1827. Measuring 300 metres (330 yd) in length, the bridge was constructed between 1827 and 1836 as a result of the Edinburgh Improvement Act 1827 (7 & 8 Geo. 4. c. lxxvi).

Named after King George IV, it was designed by architect Thomas Hamilton (1784–1858) to connect the South Side district of Edinburgh to the Old Town and then use existing streets on the north to connect to the New Town. Two of Edinburgh Old Town's traditional streets, Old Bank Close and Libberton's Wynd, had to be demolished for the construction of the bridge. This also resulted in the loss of the well-known John Dowie's Tavern on Libberton’s Wynd.

=== August 2021 fire ===
On 24 August 2021, a fire thought to have started in Patisserie Valerie on the bridge destroyed several businesses both on and below one end of the bridge; others were damaged by flooding from the firefighting. The alarm was raised at approximately 6:20 AM by a cleaner at the next door Elephant House café, who detected smoke. Nine fire engines and two ladder vehicles attended the fire. Apartments above were evacuated, and Candlemaker Row and Chambers Street were both closed.

The Oz Bar in Candlemaker Row was one of the businesses heavily damaged. Workers stripping plaster detached from the walls by the flooding found a back entrance to Brown Square, a residential development for the wealthy from the early 1760s that was demolished to build the bridge.

== Surroundings ==
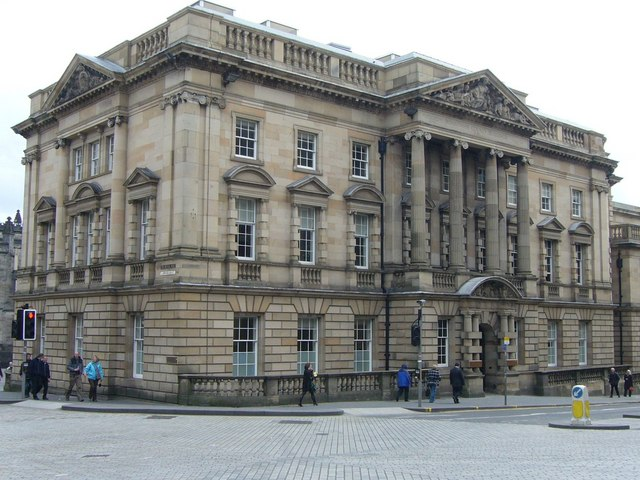
Lothian Chambers, home to the French Consulate-General on George IV Bridge

At the north end of the street, on the east side, where it joins the Royal Mile (Lawnmarket), stands Lothian Chambers which is now the offices of French Consulate-General. Opposite it, on the west side, was a row of Category B listed tenements at 1–12 Melbourne Place, demolished in 1966–67 to make way for an additional office building for Midlothian County Council, designed in 1968 by Robert Matthew of Robert Matthew Johnson Marshall partners but cleared away to make way for a new hotel development originally for Missoni, but now the G & V Hotel.

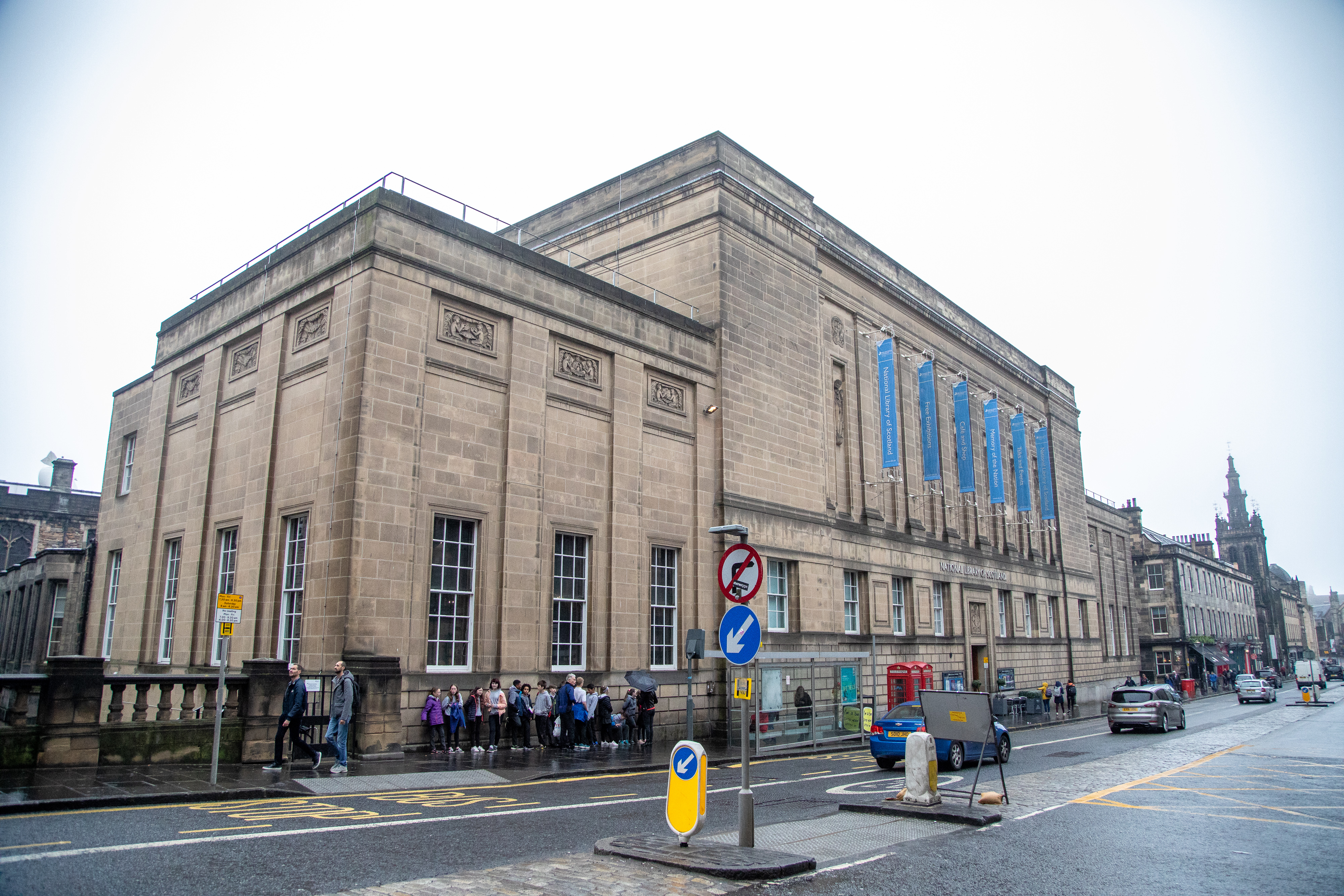
National Library of Scotland on George IV Bridge

Further south on the street lie the National Library of Scotland and (opposite) the Edinburgh Central Library, the latter being one of the many free libraries constructed with money provided by the Scottish-born philanthropist Andrew Carnegie. Around the middle of the street, where the bridge crosses the historic Cowgate, are located a number of bars and restaurants and takeaways, as well as the ESL institute Wallace College and the Augustine United Church. The former Elim Pentecostal Church has been converted to a public house.

At the southern end of the street is the junction with Candlemaker Row, where there is the statue of Greyfriars Bobby. Opposite is the junction with Chambers Street, where the National Museum of Scotland is located.

The road continues south for a short section, not truly part of the bridge and formerly known as Lindsay Place, to a Y-junction where it diverges to become Bristo Place and Forrest Road, the Bedlam Theatre (formerly the New North Free Church) sits at the meeting point of these two roads.

== See also ==
- List of bridges in Scotland
