= Cranshaws Castle =

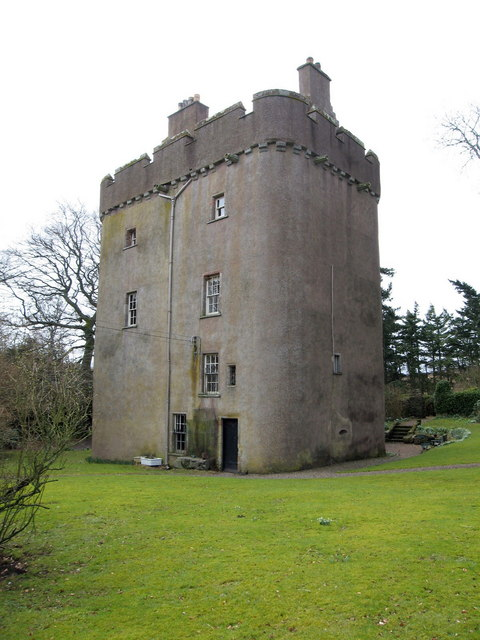
- Cranshaws Castle

- Location in the Scottish Borders
- 55.8484°N 2.5094°W

Listed Building – Category A
- Designated: 9 June 1971
- Reference no.: LB4093

Cranshaws Castle or Cranshaws Tower is a privately owned 15th-century pele situated by the village of Cranshaws in Berwickshire, Scotland. The building is still in use as a residence, and is protected as a category A listed building.

== History ==
The lands of Cranshaws were originally part of the Barony of Bothwell, which barony was created for David Olifard (ancestor of the current chief of the Oliphants) by King Malcolm IV in the mid 12th century. Occupancy (typically, this would have been a feu - the superiority remaining with the Barony of Bothwell) was then granted to a younger Olifard son, with whose line the estate remained for some centuries.

In 1329, the senior representative of the younger line but now 7th chief, William Oliphant, Lord of Aberdalgie, died and amongst the properties which he left was Cranshaws, which he had inherited from his Olifard forebears.

In 1336/7, William Olyphant’s lands of Cranschawes and Hatherwick (Hedderwick) were in the hands of Edward III., on account of this William’s forfeiture.

In the meantime, the Barony of Bothwell passed in 1252 by marriage to the Morays on the extinction of the senior line of Oliphants. In 1362 Joanna de Moravia, heiress of Bothwell, married Archibald Douglas, 3rd Earl of Douglas. Their son and heir was Archibald Douglas, 4th Earl of Douglas (1372–1424).

In 1401 Archibald Douglas, 4th Earl of Douglas bestowed Cranshaws upon Sir John Swinton, 14th of that Ilk whom the Earl calls "dilectus consanguineus nostra" (our beloved cousin)., thus dispossessing the Oliphants. Following Swinton's death at the Battle of Homildon Hill the following year, the lands passed to his son Sir John Swinton, 15th of that Ilk, who is thought to have built the existing castle (it is not known what kind of building the Oliphants had).

In 1403/4, the Earl of Dunbar and March was stripped of his Scottish lands, much of which were given to Archibald Douglas, 4th Earl of Douglas. In 1409 the Earl of Dunbar was restored to his Earldom of March and it is probable that the Earl of Douglas attempted to transfer the superiority of Cranshaws to the Earldom of March some time before that date.

In 1435-6 Cranshaws was forfeited by the Earl of March but no record has survived of Cranshaws being connected to the Earldom of Dunbar and March before this date Circa 1460 there was a protracted battle for the superiority of Cranshaws which was being claimed for the Earldom of March.

The effective removal of the Cranshaws estate from the Oliphants without compensation or consent was the start of a dispute which lasted most of the 15th century:

1412 there is a charter of the lands of Cranshawes, wherein Walter (Oliphant), is called Lord of Aberdalgie.

1442: Sir John Oliphant was retoured heir to his grandfather in the lands of Cranshaws, his sasine thereon was taken Feb. 28, 1442/3 and was formally broken the next day by Sir John Swinton of that Ilk who also claimed these lands.

1464: there was an inquest over the dispute of ownership between Swinton and Lord Oliphant.

1474: Lord Oliphant petitioned the courts for ownership of Cranshaws

1476: Lord Oliphant has indenture with Alexander, duke of Albany (and Earl of March) to pay 30 years "non entry" since the death of his father, Sir John Oliphant for the lands of Cranshaws. It goes on to say that no agreement to be entered into with Sir Johne of Swyntoune nor with any others of his name without special permission of the said duke, and then with payment to the duke of 1000 merks within 40 days; the duke gives Lord Oliphant permission to pursue Sir Johne of Swyntoune and his heirs and any others who have taken up "malis" from the lands of Cranschaws since the decease of Sir John Oliphant

1476: Lord Oliphant claiming rights, "raided" Cranshaws, "stealing" oxen & horses.

During the war known as the Rough Wooing, an English soldier Thomas Carlyle came to Cranshaws in February 1545. He brought 30 horsemen and fought with men who had come to Cranshaws to meet the Laird of Swinton, warden of the East March of Scotland.

The castle was re-acquired by another branch of the Douglas family, the Earls of Morton in the 18th century and there were extensive renovations carried out by George Douglas, 13th Earl of Morton (1662–1738).

The building was restored in 1896/97 by Andrew Smith of Whitchester and in 1931 passed to his nephew Stenhard Landale FRSE.

== Construction ==
A rectangular keep, the castle has four storeys and rounded corners. The castle originally would have had a defensive barmkin of which there is no remnant. Its crenellated parapet is thought to have been built in the late 19th century when the castle had been sold on by the Mortons.

== Literature and folklore ==
Cranshaws Castle is thought to be the inspiration for "Ravenswood Castle", the home of Edgar, hero of Sir Walter Scott's tragedy The Bride of Lammermoor. It is also supposed to be inhabited by a Brownie.
