= Cranshaws =

Village in Scottish Borders, Scotland, UK

Coordinates: 55°51′N 2°31′W

Cranshaws is a village on the B6355 road, near Duns, in the Scottish Borders area of Scotland, in the former Berwickshire.

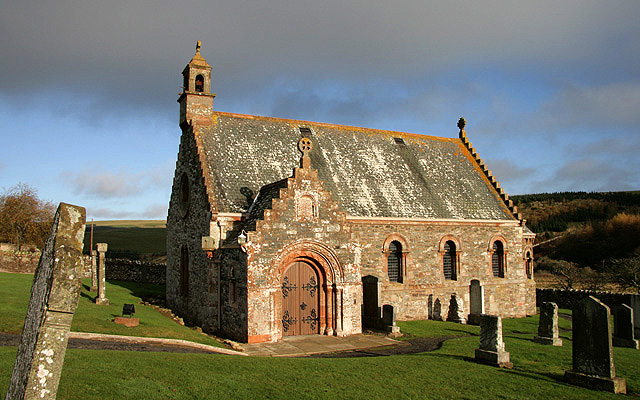
Cranshaws Parish Church

Of Cranshaws Castle only the tower remains, at Cranshaws Farm on Cranshaws Hill.

Places nearby include Abbey St Bathans, Innerwick, Longformacus, Spott, East Lothian, Stenton, the Whiteadder Water, and Whittingehame.

== See also ==
- List of places in the Scottish Borders
- List of places in Scotland
- Patrick Hepburn of Waughton
