= List of listed buildings in Innerleithen, Scottish Borders =

This is a list of listed buildings in the parish of Innerleithen in the Scottish Borders, Scotland.

== List ==
Name	Location	Date Listed	Grid Ref. (Note: Sometimes known as OSGB36, the grid reference (where provided) is based on the British national grid reference system used by the Ordnance Survey. • "Guide to National Grid". Ordnance Survey. • "Get-a-map". Ordnance Survey.)	Geo-coordinates	Notes	LB Number (Note: Historic Environment Scotland assign a unique alphanumeric identifier to each designated site in Scotland, for listed buildings this always begins with "LB", for example "LB12345".)	Image
Leithen Road, Old Bridge				55°37′24″N 3°03′37″W	Category C(S)	34969	Upload Photo
15 Pirn Road				55°37′14″N 3°03′35″W	Category C(S)	34971	Upload Photo
Holylee, Lodge				55°37′37″N 2°58′10″W	Category C(S)	49124	Upload Photo
Leithen Water, Weir, Sluice, Bridge And Mill Lade				55°38′08″N 3°03′20″W	Category C(S)	49128	Upload Photo
Walkerburn, Caberston Farm House And Steading				55°37′29″N 3°01′12″W	Category C(S)	49130	Upload Photo
Walkerburn, Galashiels Road, Stoneyhill Cottage (Former Stoneyhill Lodge) Including Boundary Wall And Gatepier				55°37′25″N 3°00′52″W	Category A	49134	Upload Photo
24 And 26 Chapel Street, Lothian And Borders Co-Operative Society Ltd				55°37′13″N 3°03′44″W	Category C(S)	51074	Upload Photo
Leithen Road, Kirklands Farmhouse Including Boundary Walls And Gatepiers				55°37′33″N 3°03′34″W	Category C(S)	51082	Upload Photo
St Ronan's Terrace, Tiendside Including Boundary Walls				55°37′16″N 3°04′07″W	Category C(S)	51089	Upload Photo
Damside, Ballantyne Cashmere Uk, Caerlee Mill Including Boilerhouse, Chimney, Weaving Sheds, Ancillary Buildings, Boundary Walls And Gatepiers				55°37′16″N 3°03′50″W	Category B	34968	Upload Photo
Walkerburn, Galashiels Road, Stoneyhill House, Stables And Boundary Walls				55°37′30″N 3°00′47″W	Category A	12930	Upload Photo
Nether Horsburgh Farm House, Walled Garden And Farm Buildings				55°38′41″N 3°06′24″W	Category B	8333	Upload Photo
Glenormiston, Garden Cottage, Garden Wall And Ha - Ha				55°37′49″N 3°05′18″W	Category C(S)	49119	Upload Photo
Holylee Farm, Holylee Cottages				55°37′43″N 2°58′03″W	Category C(S)	49123	Upload Photo
Holylee, Walled Garden				55°37′41″N 2°58′08″W	Category C(S)	49125	Upload Photo
Kirnie Law Reservoir And Surge Tower				55°38′15″N 3°02′12″W	Category B	49126	Upload Photo
Walkerburn, Galashiels Road, Walkerburn Parish Church (Church Of Scotland) Including Boundary Walls				55°37′28″N 3°00′42″W	Category B	49133	Upload Photo
1 Buccleuch Street, Innerleithen Public Library Including Boundary Walls				55°37′11″N 3°03′35″W	Category C(S)	51073	Upload Photo
Church Street, St Andrews Episcopal Church Including Boundary Walls And Gates				55°37′20″N 3°03′43″W	Category C(S)	51075	Upload Photo
5, 7, 9 And 11 High Street, Robert Smail's Printing Works, Including Printing Works, Courtyard And Mill Lade				55°37′10″N 3°03′43″W	Category C(S)	51077	Upload Photo
Peebles Road, Easter And Wester Caerlee (Formerly Caerlee House) Including Wash House And Garage				55°37′00″N 3°04′21″W	Category C(S)	51086	Upload Photo
Waverley Road, Runic Cross Including Boundary Walls				55°37′06″N 3°03′47″W	Category C(S)	51090	Upload Photo
Walkerburn, Galashiels Road, Sunnybrae Lodge Including Gatepiers, Stables And Boundary Walls				55°37′25″N 3°00′54″W	Category A	49136	Upload Photo
91 High Street And St James Hall (Formerly St James Rc School And Schoolhouse) Including Boundary Walls				55°37′06″N 3°03′53″W	Category C(S)	51076	Upload Photo
2 Leithen Crescent, Vale Of Leithen Social Club Including Boundary Walls And Railings				55°37′11″N 3°03′41″W	Category C(S)	51081	Upload Photo
Leithen Road, Municipal Buildings And Memorial Hall				55°37′15″N 3°03′43″W	Category C(S)	51084	Upload Photo
Peebles Road, Alpinebikes, Former Congregational Chapel				55°37′05″N 3°04′01″W	Category C(S)	51085	Upload Photo
St Ronan's Terrace, Glenroy (Formerly St Ronan's Lodge) Including Boundary Walls				55°37′24″N 3°04′04″W	Category C(S)	51087	Upload Photo
St Ronan's Terrace, The Pines (Formerly Bellenden) Including Garden Walls, Steps, Ancillary Structures, Boundary Walls Gates And Gatepiers				55°37′15″N 3°04′07″W	Category B	51088	Upload Photo
Morningside Meikle Sawmill Wheelhouse And Turbine House Including Mill Lade				55°37′05″N 3°03′41″W	Category C(S)	34976	Upload Photo
Glenormiston, Lodge Including Gatepiers, Gates And Railings				55°37′42″N 3°05′40″W	Category C(S)	8319	Upload Photo
Walkerburn, The Kirna (formerly Grangehill), also known as Kirna House				55°37′34″N 3°01′57″W	Category A	8323	Upload another image See more images
Glenormiston, Velvet Hall Cottage				55°37′32″N 3°05′20″W	Category C(S)	49121	Upload Photo
Walkerburn, Bascule Bridge (Over The River Tweed)				55°37′19″N 3°01′01″W	Category C(S)	49129	Upload Photo
Walkerburn, Galashiels Road, Sunnybrae House				55°37′27″N 3°00′58″W	Category C(S)	49135	Upload Photo
Walkerburn, Galashiels Road, Tweedvale House				55°37′27″N 3°01′01″W	Category C(S)	49138	Upload Photo
High Street, St James Roman Catholic Church And Presbytery Including Boundary Walls And Gatepiers				55°37′05″N 3°03′54″W	Category B	34974	Upload Photo
Walkerburn, Prefabricated Cast - Iron Urinal				55°37′26″N 3°01′11″W	Category A	8326	Upload another image
Walkerburn, Caberston Road, Ballantyne Memorial Institute				55°37′21″N 3°01′03″W	Category C(S)	49131	Upload Photo
13A And 15 High Street				55°37′10″N 3°03′44″W	Category C(S)	51078	Upload Photo
2 High Street, Bank Of Scotland				55°37′11″N 3°03′44″W	Category C(S)	51079	Upload Photo
Leithen Road, Leithen Bank				55°37′31″N 3°03′35″W	Category C(S)	51083	Upload Photo
Leithen Road, Innerleithen Parish Church Including Runic Cross, Boundary Walls, Gates And Gatepiers				55°37′17″N 3°03′45″W	Category B	34966	Upload Photo
Walkerburn, Galashiels Road, Lodge to Tweedvale House				55°37′25″N 3°00′59″W	Category B	12931	Upload Photo
Glenormiston House				55°37′51″N 3°05′20″W	Category C(S)	8318	Upload Photo
Lee Tower				55°38′46″N 3°04′07″W	Category C(S)	8320	Upload Photo
Holylee Including Terrace Wall				55°37′42″N 2°58′17″W	Category B	8324	Upload Photo
Holylee Farm, Old Holylee				55°37′46″N 2°58′05″W	Category B	8325	Upload Photo
Leithen Water, Bridge (Near Golf Course)				55°38′15″N 3°03′25″W	Category C(S)	49127	Upload Photo
Wells Brae, St Ronan's Well, Former Pump Room, Bottling Plant, Ancillary Buildings And Boundary Walls				55°37′26″N 3°04′03″W	Category B	34970	Upload Photo
Leithen Lodge With Lochend Arch, Outbuildings And Sundial				55°40′26″N 3°04′53″W	Category A	13475	Upload another image
Glenormiston, Ivy Bridge				55°37′44″N 3°05′27″W	Category C(S)	49120	Upload Photo
Glenormiston, Water Tank				55°37′52″N 3°05′17″W	Category C(S)	49122	Upload Photo
Walkerburn, Galashiels Road, Windlestraw, formerly Tweed Valley Country House, formerly Nether Caberston. Including Steps, Garden Terrace, Greenhouse And Garden Walls				55°37′33″N 3°00′32″W	Category B	49137	Upload Photo
42-48 (Even Nos) High Street, St Ronan's View				55°37′09″N 3°03′49″W	Category C(S)	51080	Upload Photo
Leithen Road, Mansley Lodge And The Green Gates Including Boundary Walls				55°37′38″N 3°03′32″W	Category C(S)	34972	Upload Photo
Leithen Road, Leithen House Including Boundary Walls				55°37′24″N 3°03′38″W	Category C(S)	34973	Upload Photo
Walkerburn, Galashiels Road, War Memorial				55°37′25″N 3°00′56″W	Category C(S)	8322	Upload Photo
Horsburgh, Viaduct				55°38′24″N 3°06′56″W	Category B	8327	Upload Photo
Walkerburn, Galashiels Road, Holly House (Former Walkerburn Parish Church Manse)				55°37′29″N 3°00′40″W	Category C(S)	49132	Upload Photo

== Key ==
The scheme for classifying buildings in Scotland is:

- Category A: "buildings of national or international importance, either architectural or historic; or fine, little-altered examples of some particular period, style or building type."
- Category B: "buildings of regional or more than local importance; or major examples of some particular period, style or building type, which may have been altered."
- Category C: "buildings of local importance; lesser examples of any period, style, or building type, as originally constructed or moderately altered; and simple traditional buildings which group well with other listed buildings."

In March 2016 there were 47,288 listed buildings in Scotland. Of these, 8% were Category A, and 50% were Category B, with the remaining 42% being Category C.
