= Frederick Thomas Pilkington =

British architect

- Born: 9 August 1832; Stamford, England
- Died: 18 September 1898 (aged 66); Pinner, England
- Occupation: Architect
- Known for: Ruskinian Gothic, Venetian Romanesque design
- Parents: Thomas Pilkington, architect (father); Jane Butterworth (mother)

Frederick Thomas Pilkington (9 August 1832 – 18 September 1898), pupil of his father, was a "Rogue" British architect, practising in the Victorian High Gothic revival style. He designed mostly churches and institutional buildings in Scotland. Typical of his work is the Barclay Viewforth Church in Edinburgh, a polychrome stone structure with early French Gothic details.

== Life ==
Pilkington was one of several children to Thomas Pilkington, architect, and Jane Butterworth of Stamford, England. The family moved to Edinburgh in 1854. In 1855 T. Pilkington & Son, architects and surveyors, were living and working at 10 Dundas Street in Edinburgh's Second New Town.

Pilkington studied mathematics under Professor Philip Kelland at the University of Edinburgh, passed his exams in 1858 and was Hamilton prizewinner in Logic, but did not bother to graduate. He signed the University Matriculation Register 1856/7 as of Stamford.

Pilkington married in 1858 and lived at Mary Cottage in the suburb of Trinity in the north of Edinburgh. His wife died in childbirth in March 1861 and Pilkington remarried to Elizabeth Cropley from Ely, Cambridgeshire in August 1861 with whom he raised a family of five children, living successively in Cumin Place, Eton Terrace, Egremont House in Dick Place which he built for himself. His family comprised Ernest born 1864, architect, died during the First World War, Maud Elizabeth, a miniaturist; Ethel Mary; Mabel Jane; and Frederick Percy, born 1874.

In later life Pilkington lived in 17 Carlton Terrace on Calton Hill. This is a Georgian townhouse by the architect William Henry Playfair rather than a building of his own design.

After an illustrious but troubled professional life Pilkington returned to London, England in 1883 and died in Pinner on 18 September 1898, leaving £6,609 (Probate November 1899).

== Architect ==
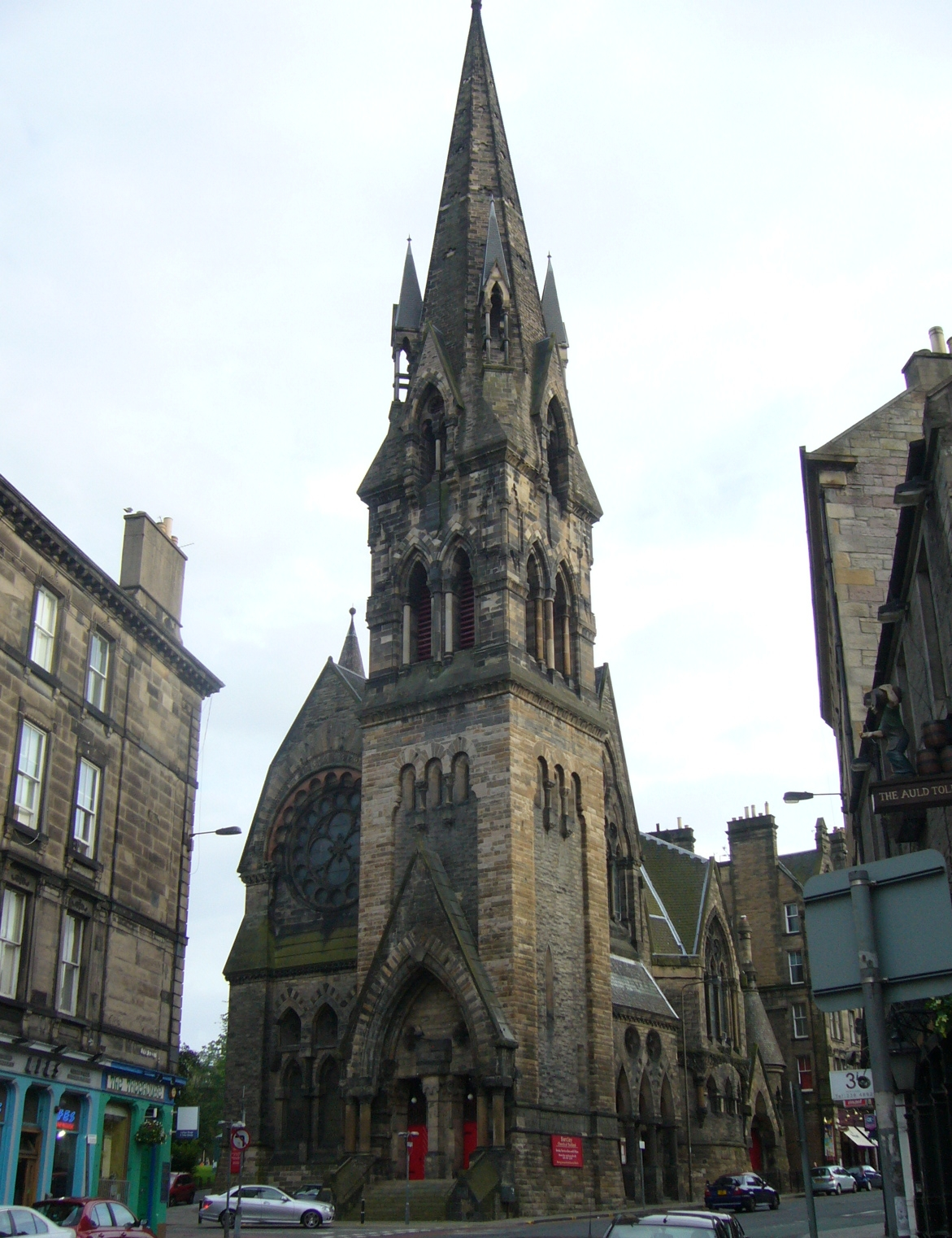
Barclay Church, Edinburgh

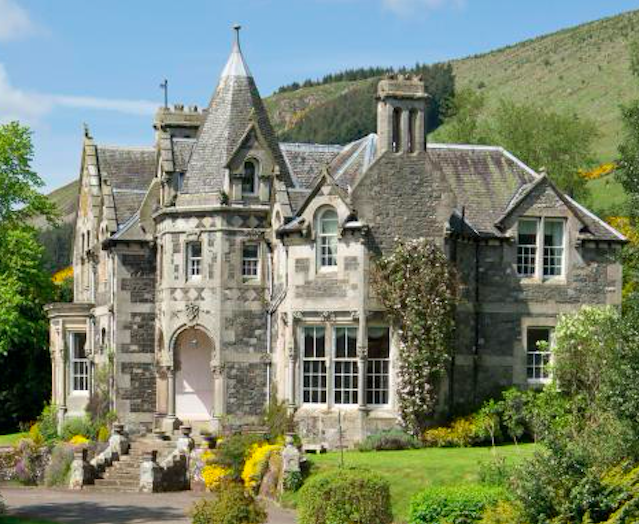
The Kirna, Walkerburn

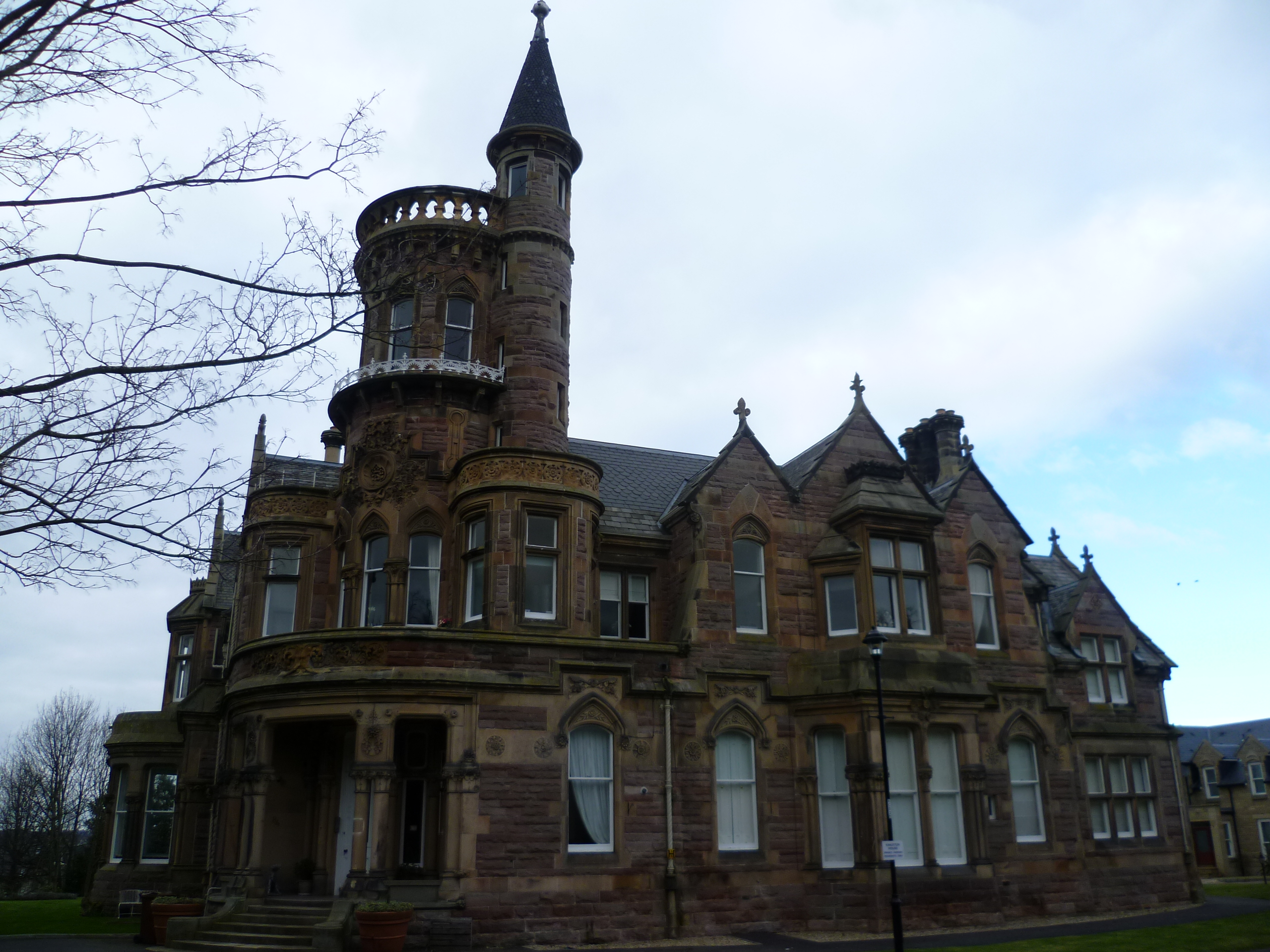
Kingston House, Liberton Edinburgh

Pilkington adhered closely to Ruskin's principles, and in the High Victorian tradition which they promoted he evolved a highly personal style by mixing northern medieval elements with those from the Gothic architecture of Northern Italy as published by John Ruskin and George Edmund Street. His work featured polychrome stone, chunky rustication and lavish external carving of Venetian medieval buildings combined with French rose windows, decorated tracery, high-pitched roofs and deep, rain-conscious porches.

In 1854 Pilkington's practice exhibited designs for a church and workers' housing at the Royal Scottish Academy in Edinburgh. After attending the University of Edinburgh in 1858 he designed and built Inchglass, a large Gothic Revival villa at Crieff, Tayside.

By 1860 Pilkington had secured the patronage of the papermakers John and Charles Cowan in Penicuik and in 1861 secured their commission for the Scottish National Institution for the Education of Imbecile Children at Larbert, Falkirk. Approximately five years later he also obtained the patronage of Henry Ballantyne (1802-1865) to build villas for the Ballantyne family in Walkerburn, and to design and build a new village with houses for the Ballantyne mill workers. Two of the villas, The Kirna (1867) and Stoneyhill (1868) were characterized by richly sculptured Venetian Romanesque designs, with Moorish influences. These designs were also found in his own house Egremont (1865), 38 Dick Place, Edinburgh and Craigmount Park (1869).

Between 1861 and 1866 Pilkington secured commissions for Trinity Church (1861-3), Irvine, Strathclyde, The Moray Free Church (1862), Edinburgh, South Church (1862-3), Penicuik, Lothian, and St John's (1862-6), Edenside, Kelso, Borders. The most dramatic was the Barclay-Bruntsfield Church (1862-4), Edinburgh, with its landmark spire, unprecedented conical cluster of prismatic sections crowning the apses of the heart-shaped plan. All follow the same basic concept of a large galleried auditorium, transformed to a Greek cross at the upper level. All his churches of this period include rich naturalistic carving, including some of his smaller designs at Auchengray (c. 1865), Strathclyde, and Innerleithen (c. 1865), Borders. In 1866 he designed the Marykirk church in Stirling, commissioned by Christian Maclagan, which shared many of these features, although the kirk was built on a difficult site and was pulled down in 1954; full records of its style do not remain.

By the mid-1860's his earlier use of polychrome masonry was replaced by more conventional plans last at Windsor Place Church (1866), Cardiff, Glamorgan.

In 1867 he went into partnership with John Murray Bell (1839-1877) to form Pilkington & Bell, Bell providing the structural know-how, Pilkington providing the design flair.

At the Eastern Club (1868), Dundee, Pilkington combines Romanesque and Renaissance motifs. By 1874 at Dean Park House, Edinburgh, he turned to a giant-scales contemporary French style.

In 1883, Pilkington moved to London after he was commissioned to work the Army and Navy Hotel (1180-2), Victoria Street. His move to London did not lead to any other major commissions. His practice transitioned to designing residential flats for both the Artisans, Labourers & General Dwellings Company and for the middle-classes. This second category of flats include Campden Hill Court, Kensington and York Mansions, Battersea.

Pilkington did not see the completion of York Mansions, his last commission, as he died before its completion in 1901.

== Notable buildings ==
=== Buildings in Edinburgh ===
- Barclay Church 1862-4
- 38 Dick Place (Pilkington's own house which he called Egremont, built within the Grange Park House estate), 1865–1870
- 48–50 Dick Place, 1864
- 158–164 Grove Street, 1864
- Craigend Park (Kingston Clinic), 1867–69
- 1–7 Coltbridge Terrace, 1869
- 129–131 Grange Loan, 1872
- Daniel Stewart's Boarding House (formerly Dean Park House), 1874
- 3 Queensferry Terrace, Dean Park House Stable Block, 1874
- 8 Spylaw Road, mid-1870s
- 39–51 Deanhaugh Street, 1880–81
- Moray Free Church, South Back of the Canongate, 1862
- New Free Church, Viewforth (then Viewforth St. Oswald's),1871

=== Elsewhere in Scotland ===
- Auchengray Church, by Carnwath, South Lanarkshire, 1864-5
- Trinity Church, Irvine, Ayrshire, 1861–63, currently on the Buildings at Risk register for Scotland.
- Free Church, Innerleithen, Scottish Borders, (1864–67), still in use.
- St. John's Edenside, Kelso, Roxburghshire, 1863-6
- The Kirna in Walkerburn (1867)
- Penicuik Old South Church (1862)
- Woodslea, Penicuik (1862)
- Park End in Penicuik (1862)
- Sunnybrae, Walkerburn, 1857
- Stoneyhill House & Lodge, Walkerburn (1868)
- Tweedvale House & Lodge, Walkerburn (1855-9)
- Spier's school, Beith, Ayrshire. Memorial shrine to John Spier.
- Marine Hotel in North Berwick
- St Aidan's Church (United Presbyterian Church) in Morebattle, Scottish Borders, 1864/5.
- McCheyne Memorial Church, Perth Road, Dundee (1868–71)
- St. Mark's, Greenfield, Dundee, Angus, 1868
- Simson Memorial West Kilbride Cemetery, a memorial dedicated to Dr. Robert Simson, a mathematician born in the town
- New Parish Church, Lamlash, Arran, 1871
- United Presbyterian Church, Dudhope Crescent, Dundee, 1877
- Inchglas, Broich Terrace, Crieff, 1856

=== Outside Scotland ===
- City United Reformed Church (The New Presbyterian Church), Cardiff, Wales, 1867

== Gallery ==
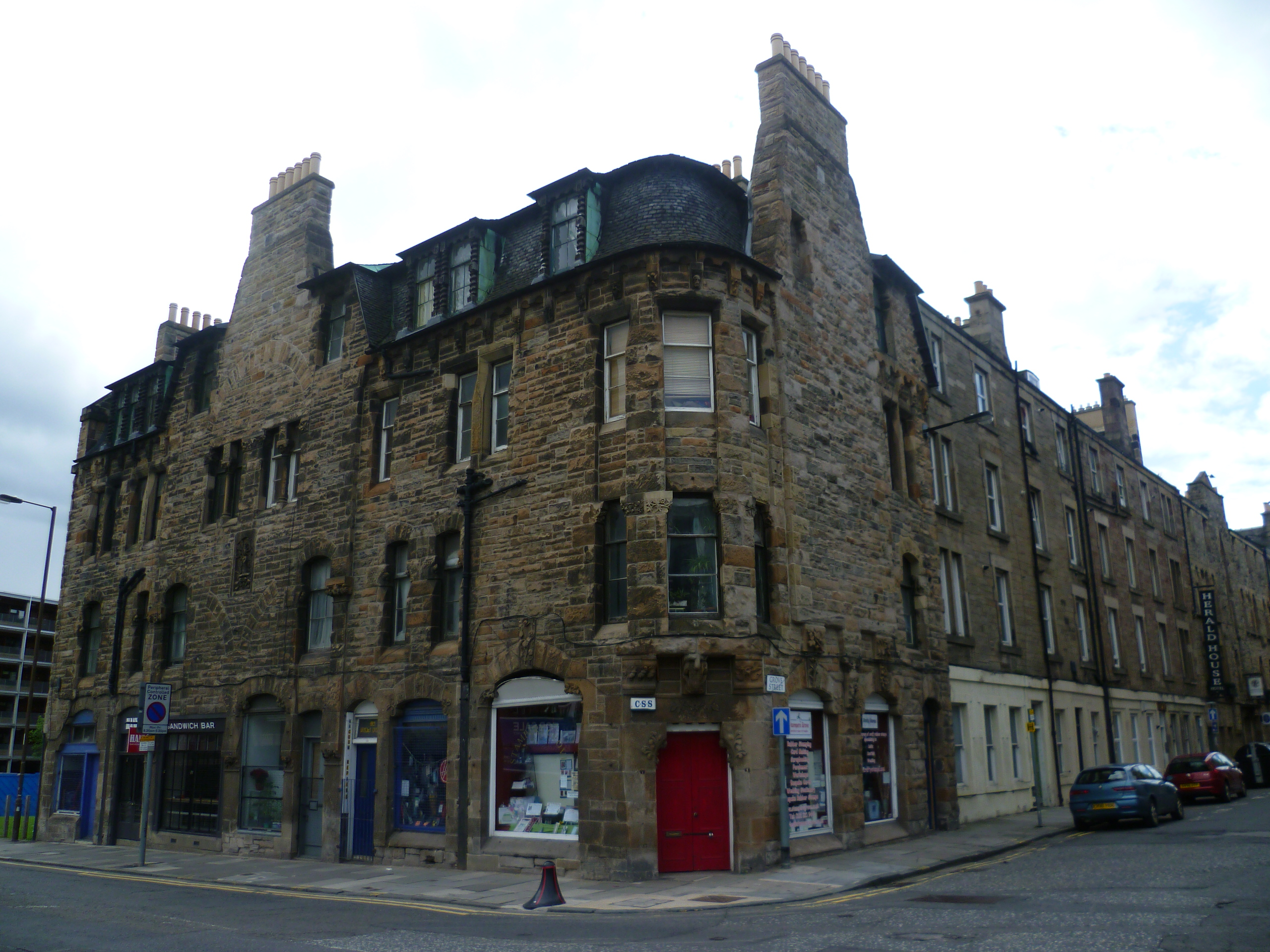
Tenement on the corner of Grove Street, Edinburgh

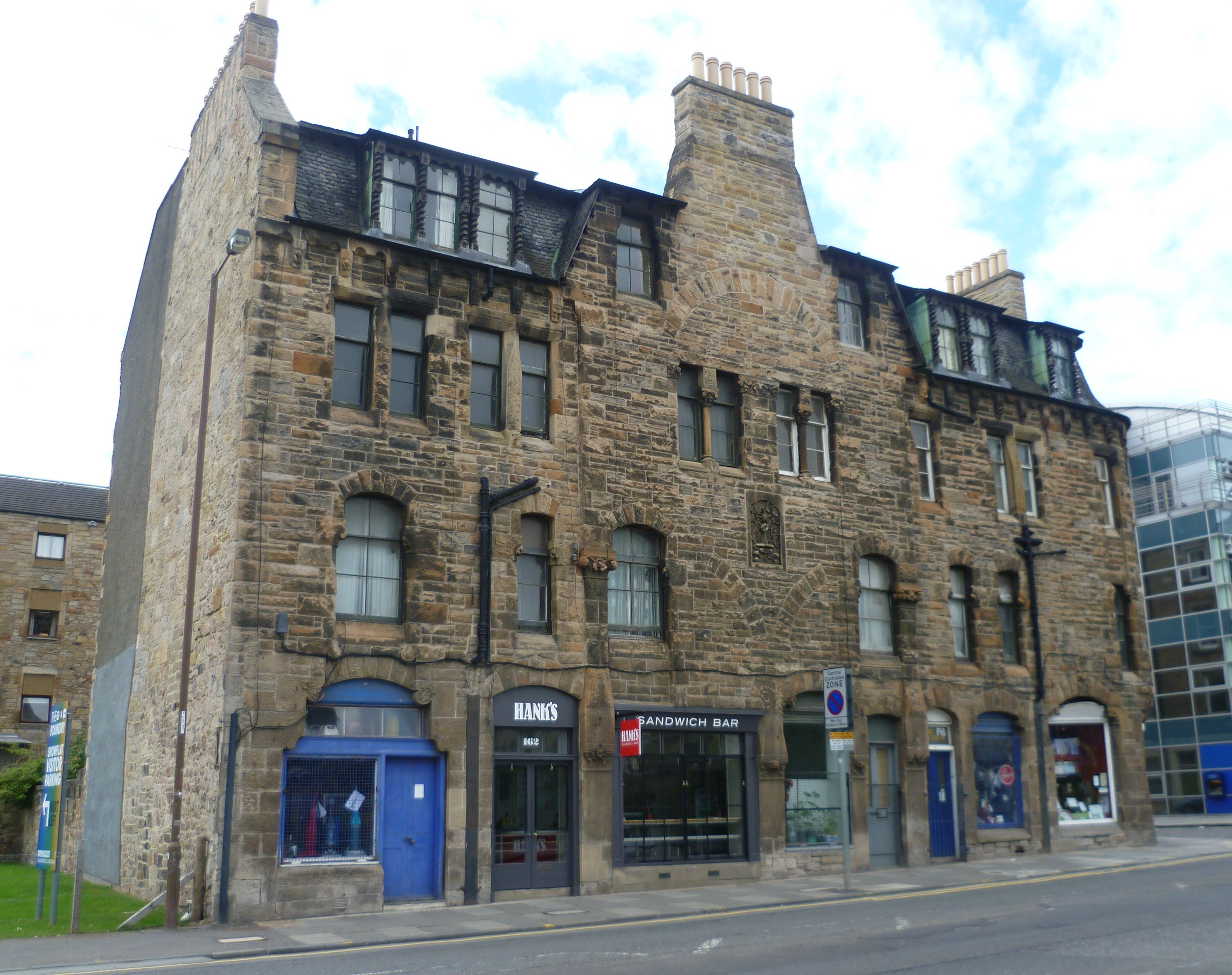
The Fountainbridge frontage of the Grove Street tenement

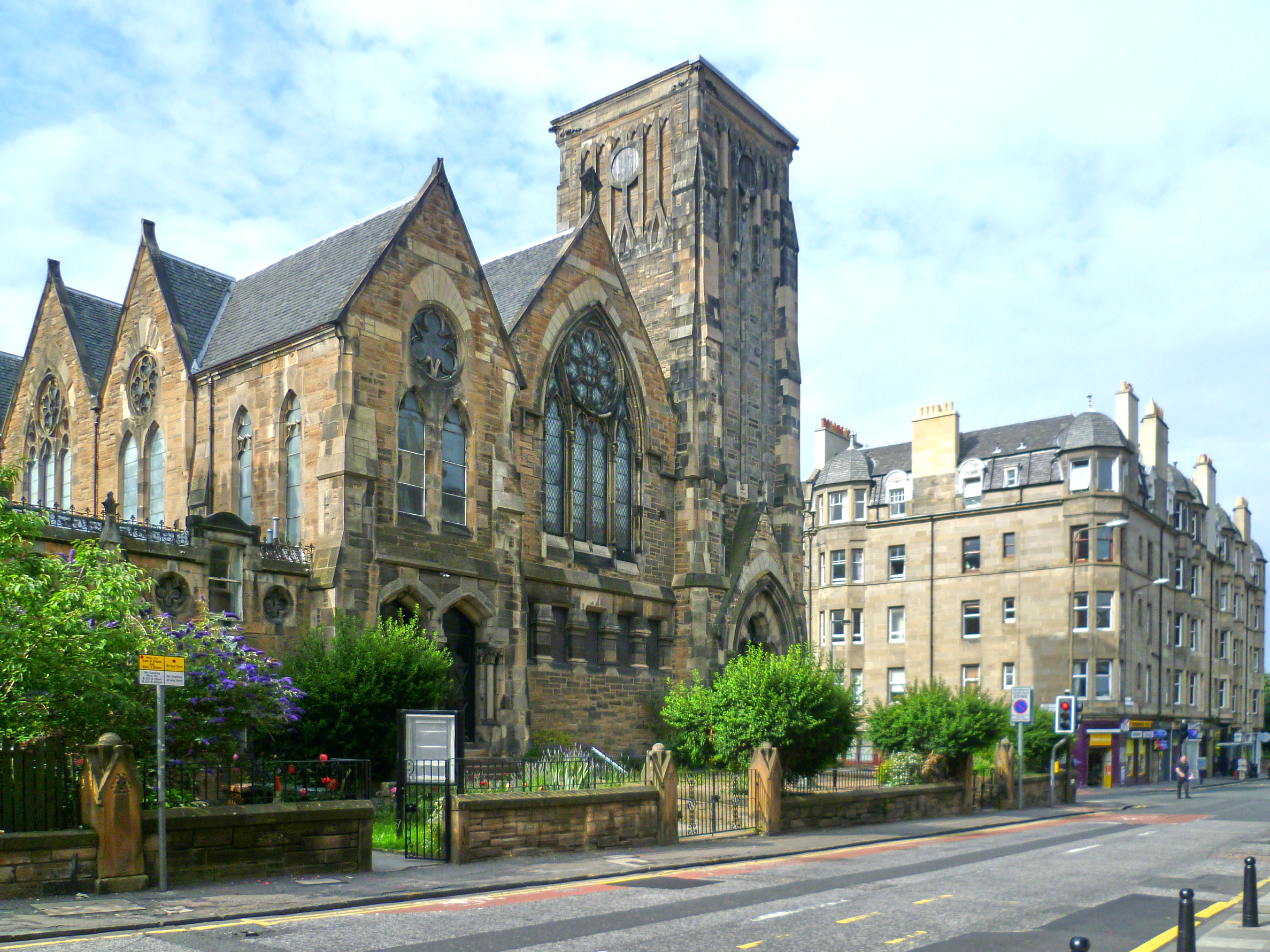
St. Oswald's Parish Church (with reduced tower), Viewforth

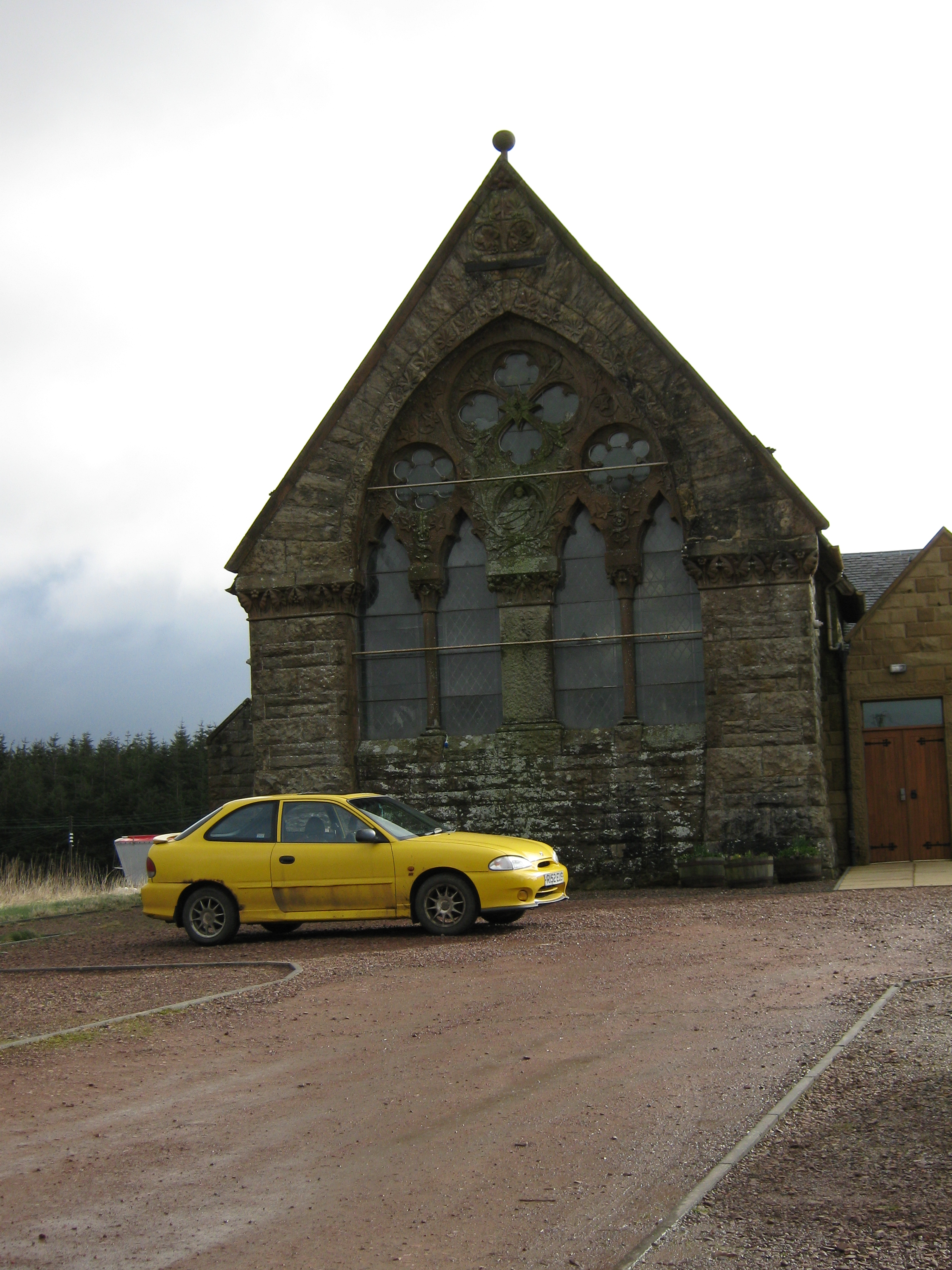
Auchengray Church

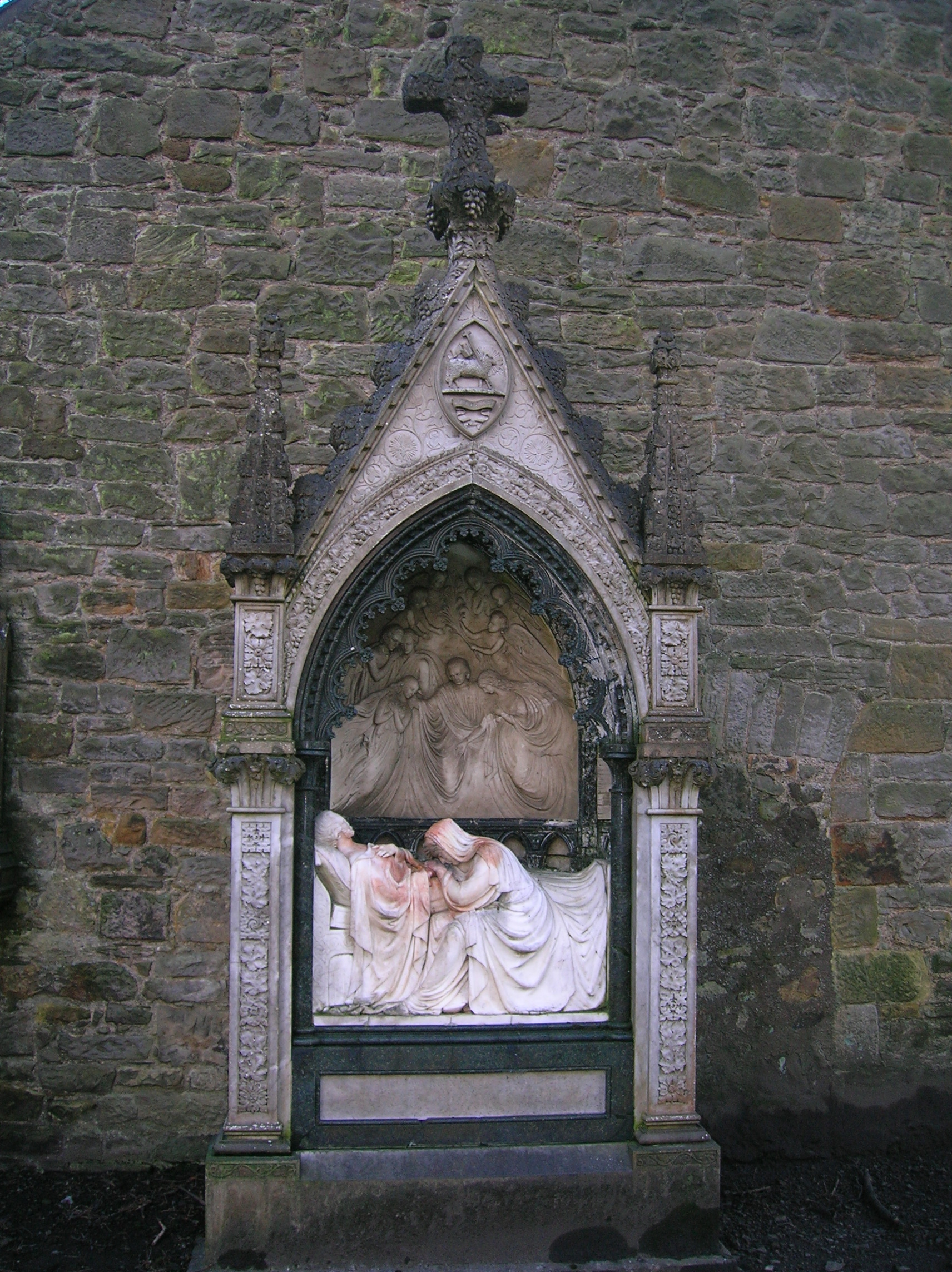
The John Spier memorial, designed by F T Pilkington, now at Beith Auld Kirk.

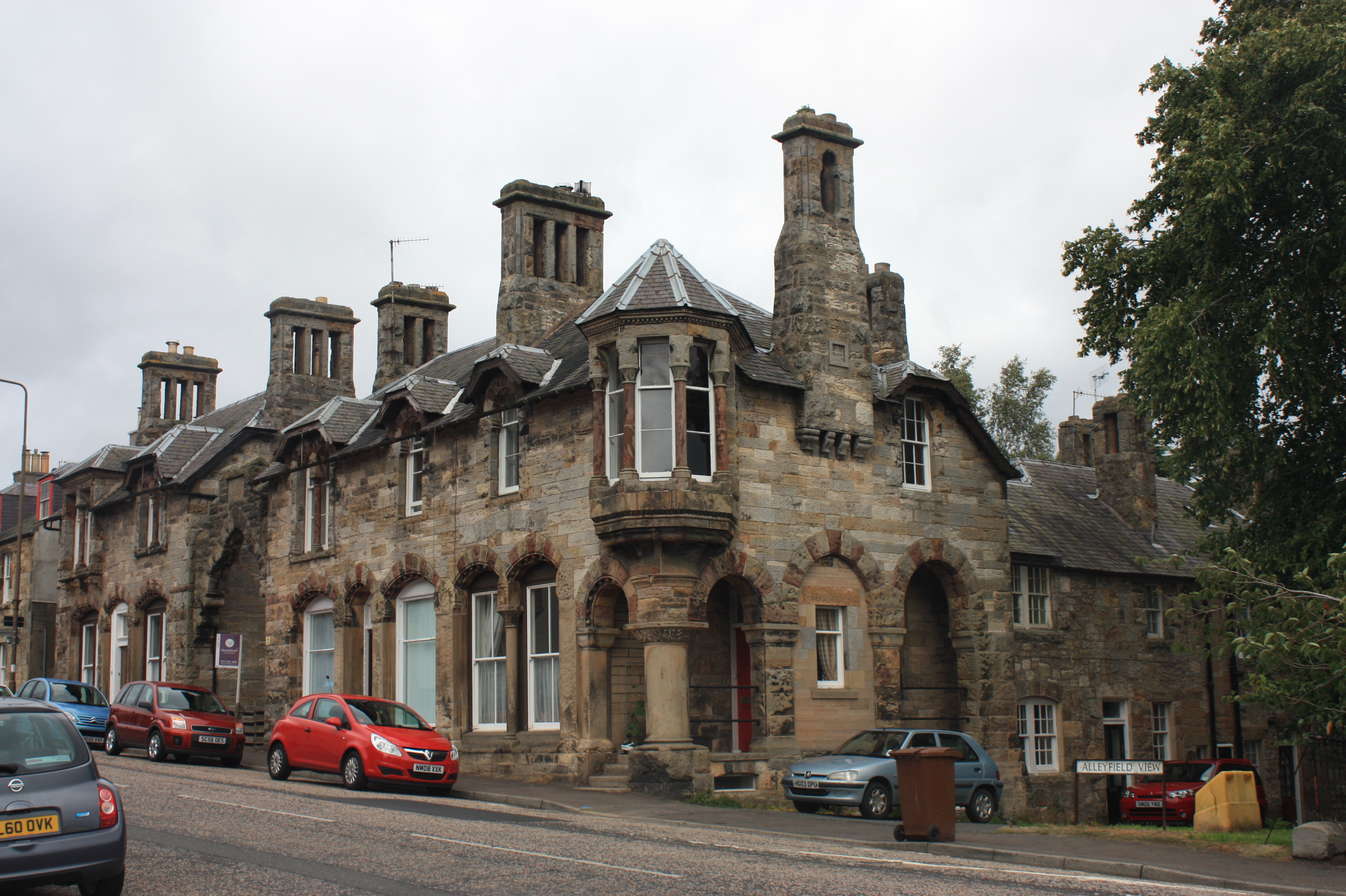
Park End, Penicuik

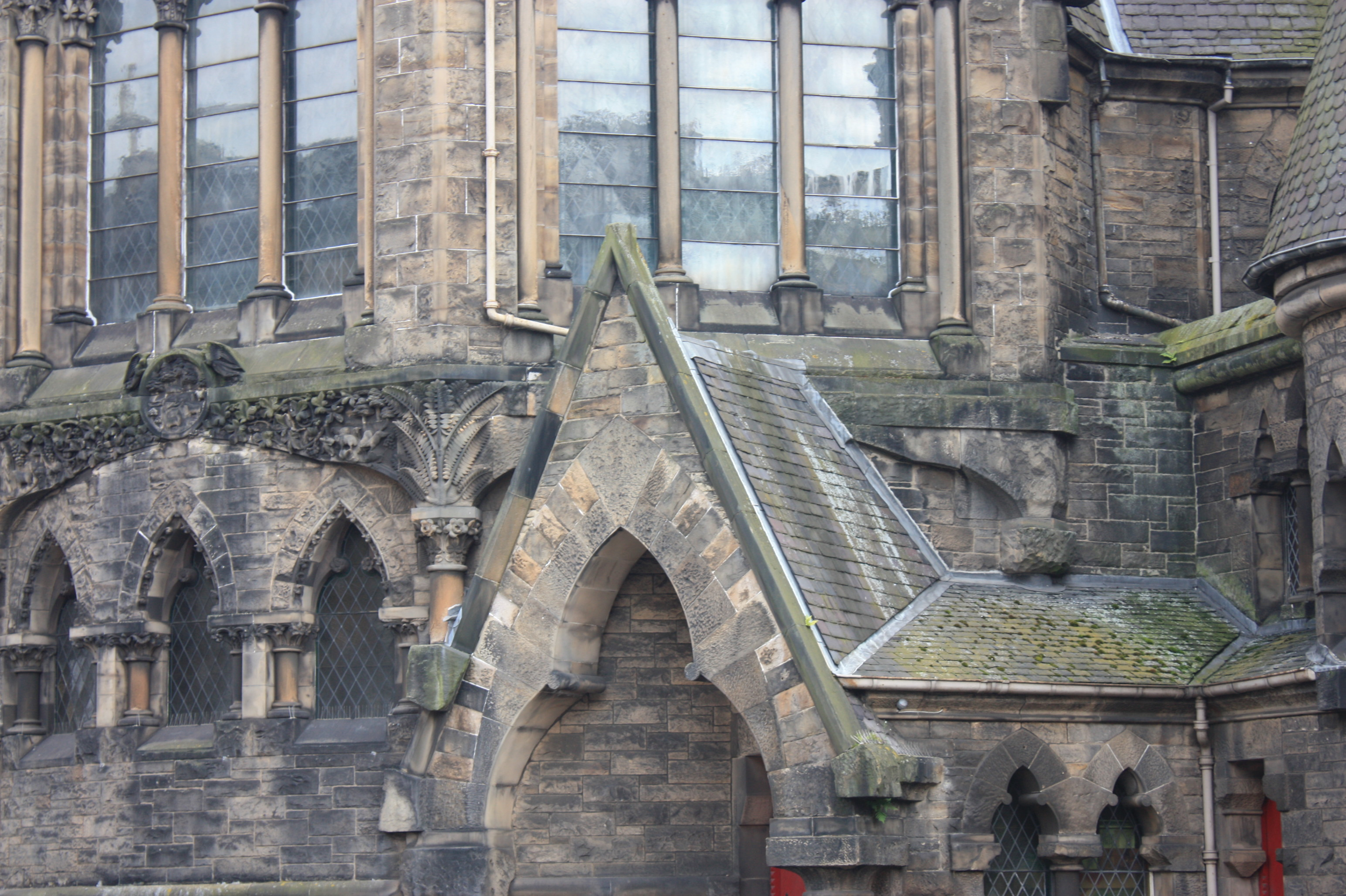
The flamboyant detailing on the Bruntsfield Barclay Church

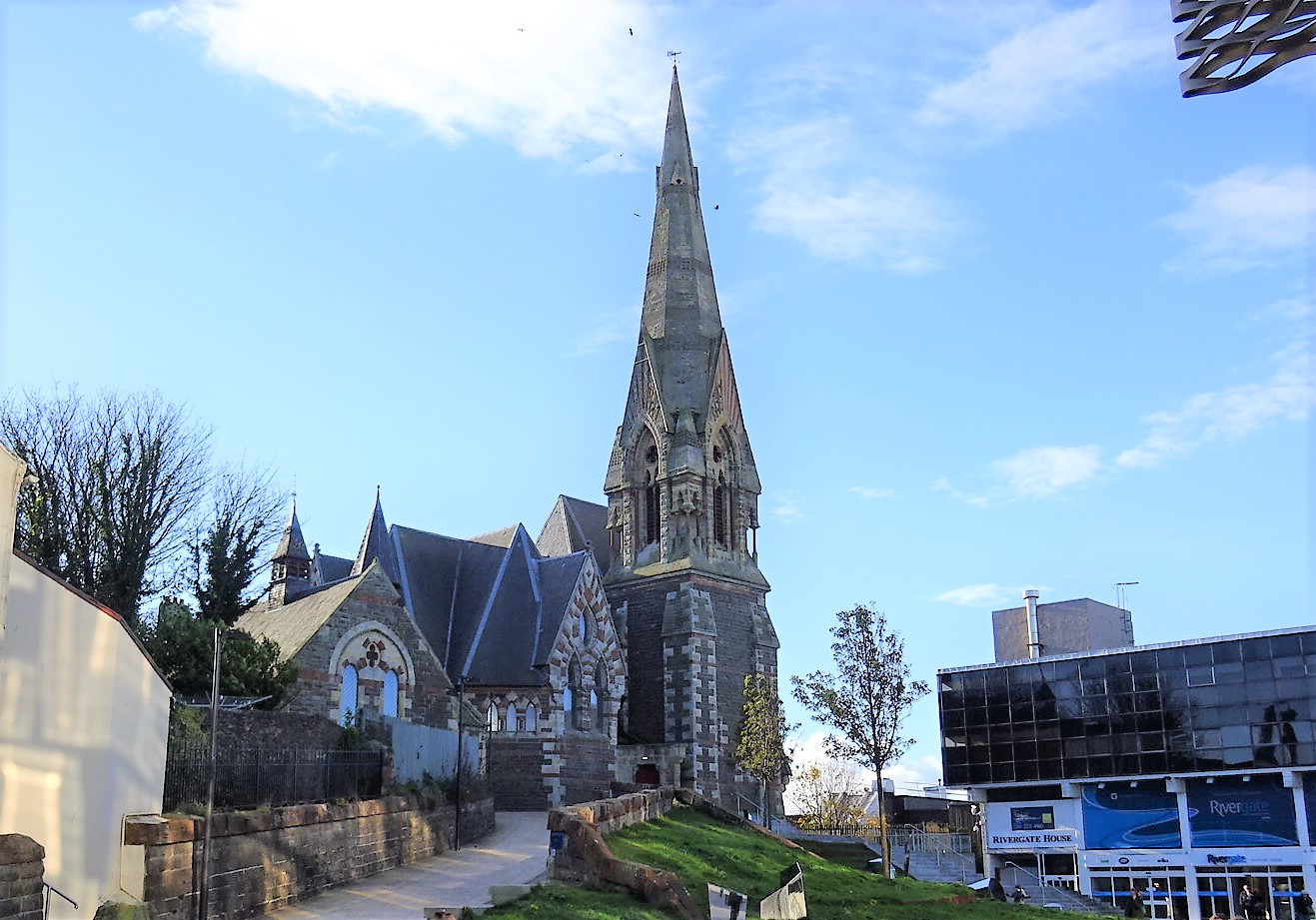
Trinity Church, Irvine

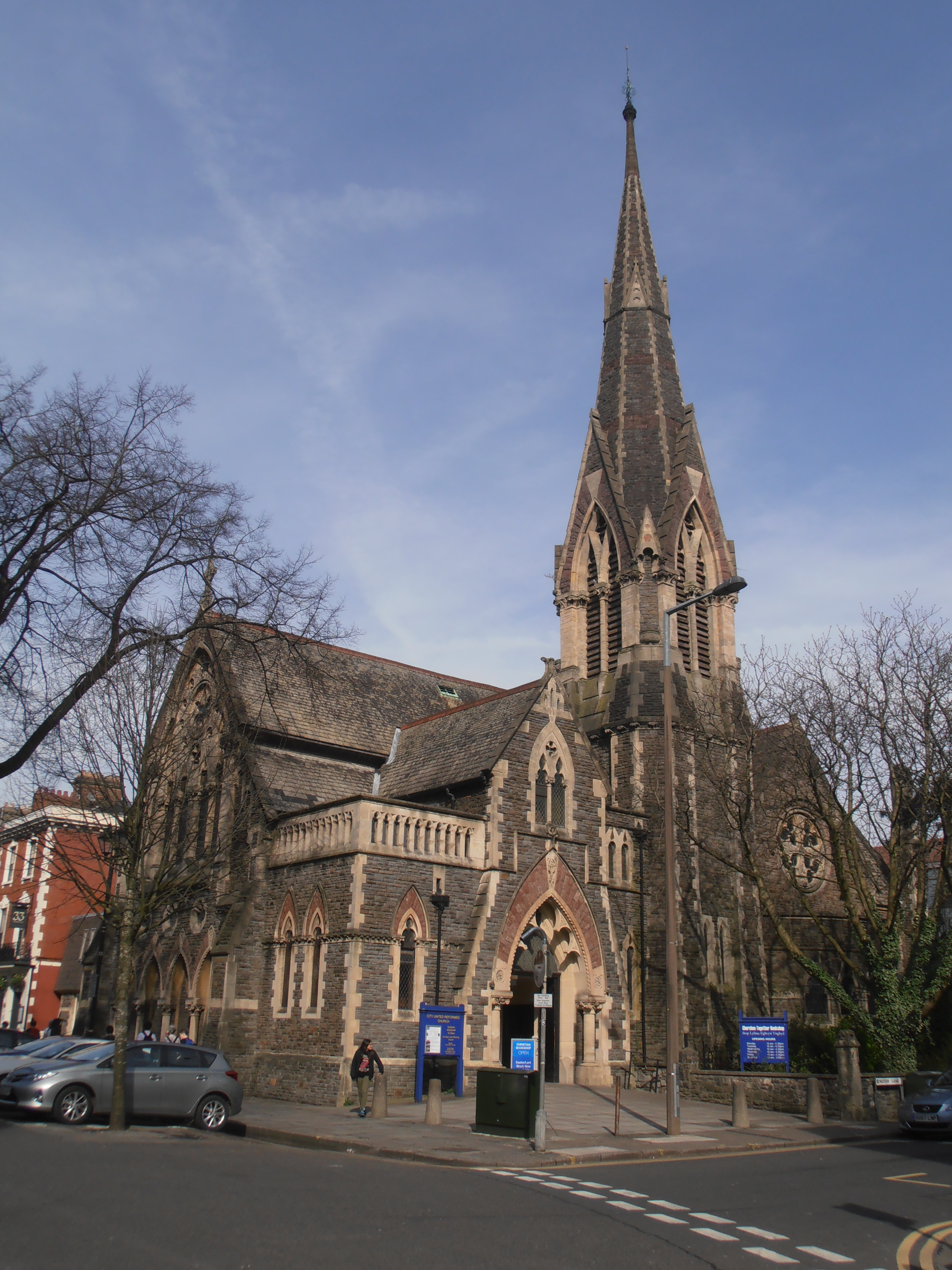
City United Reformed Church, Cardiff

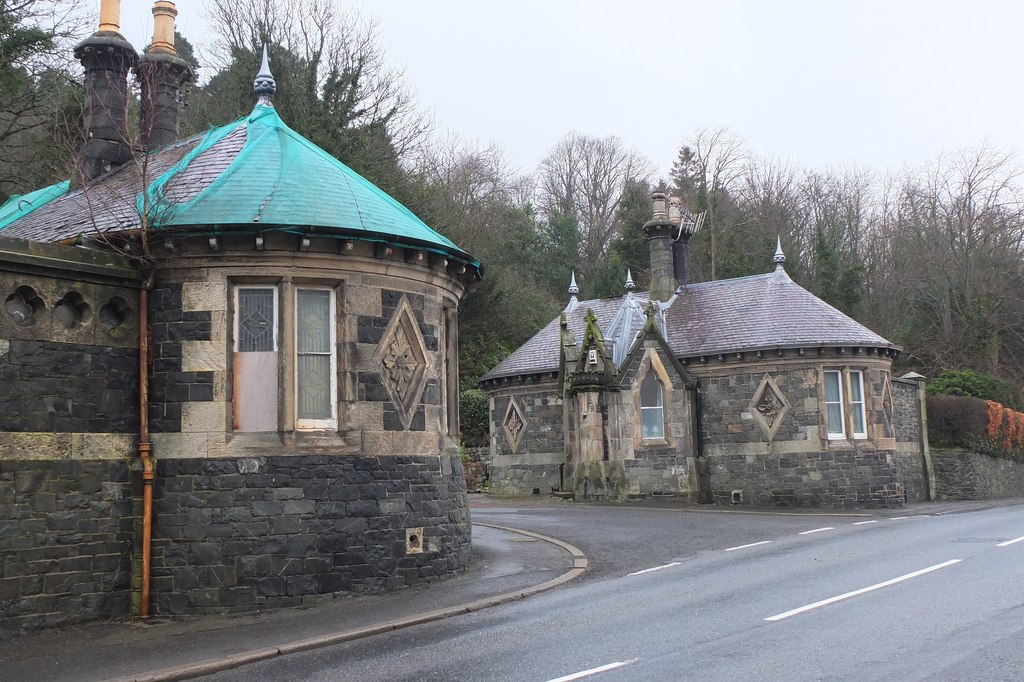
Entrance lodges for Stoneyhill, Walkerburn (geograph 4348828)
