= The Kirna =

Architectural structure in Scottish Borders, Scotland

- previously also Grangehill
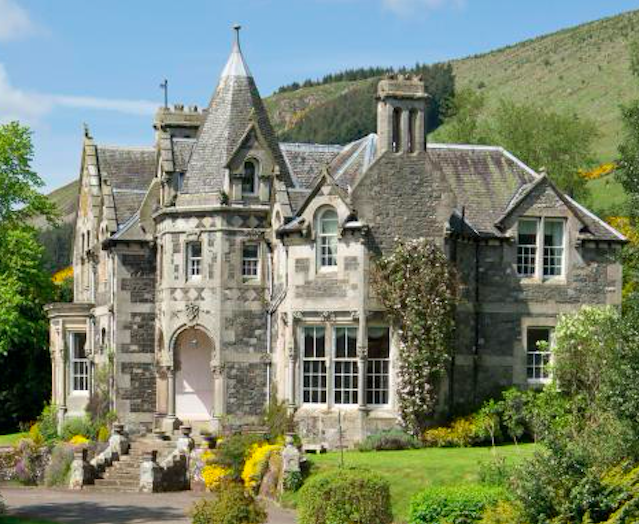
- Interactive map of The Kirna
- 55°37′34″N 3°01′57″W
- Location: Walkerburn, Scotland
- Nearest city: Edinburgh

History
- Built: 1867
- Built for: George Ballantyne (1836-1924)

Site notes
- Elevation: 170 m (560 ft)
- Architect: Frederick Thomas Pilkington
- Architectural styles: Scots Baronial, High Victorian Gothic, Ruskinian Gothic, Venetian Romanesque
- Owner: the Facey family

Listed Building – Category A
- Official name: The Kirna
- Designated: 22 July 1985
- Reference no.: 8323
- UPRN: 116052937

The Kirna, known locally as Kirna House (previously also as Grangehill), is a Category A listed villa in Walkerburn, Peeblesshire, Scotland. It is one of three villas in Walkerburn designed by Frederick Thomas Pilkington between 1866 and 1869 for the Ballantyne family after Henry Ballantyne first bought land at that location to build a tweed mill in 1846. It is listed as a fine example of a Pilkington mansion retaining original external features, a fine interior, and for its importance as a Ballantyne property.

The Ballantyne family played a leading role in Scotland's textile industry for nearly two hundred years and were substantially responsible for founding the village of Walkerburn.

From its completion in 1867 until 1941, The Kirna was owned and occupied by members of prominent Scottish industrial, professional, and landed families, reflecting its status as a residence associated with the social and economic elite of Walkerburn and the wider Scottish Borders.

The Kirna's proximity to a number of ancient man-made structures, including some dating back to pre-historic times, suggests that this general location along the Tweed valley has been of strategic importance to settlers throughout history.

== Design & architecture ==
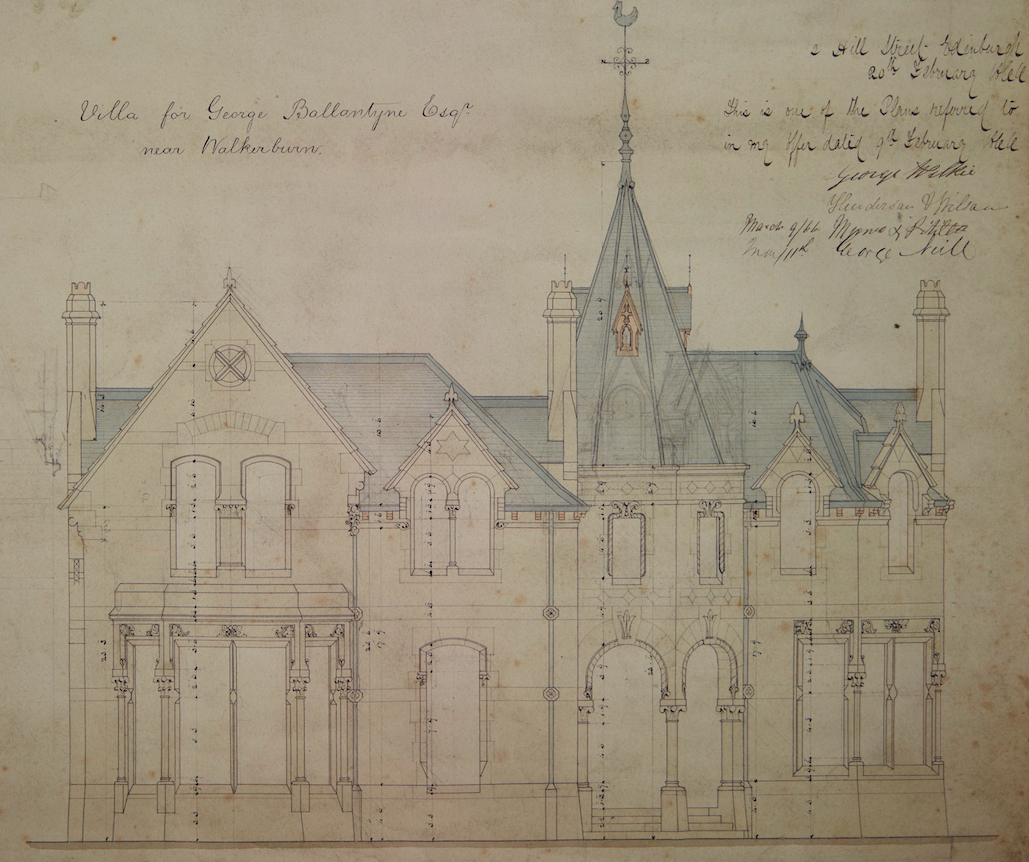
Preliminary design of front elevation, The Kirna, 1866

The Kirna was designed by British architect Frederick Thomas Pilkington. It retains all of its original 1867 Scots Baronial and Venetian Romanesque design features including an idiosyncratic tower in Ruskinian Gothic style. The heavy oak main staircase features distinctive turned and carved balusters identical to those found in F T Pilkington's own house, Egremont, 38 Dick Place, Edinburgh, and grotesque finials holding shields sporting the initials of George Ballantyne (1836-1924) and his wife Marion ("Minnie") White Aitken (1841-1914). The hallway features a large glass cupola and an artist's studio is housed in the turret room. The dining room ceiling incorporates the initials of Colin Ballantyne (1879-1942) and his wife Isabella Milne Welsh (1881-1969), respectively.

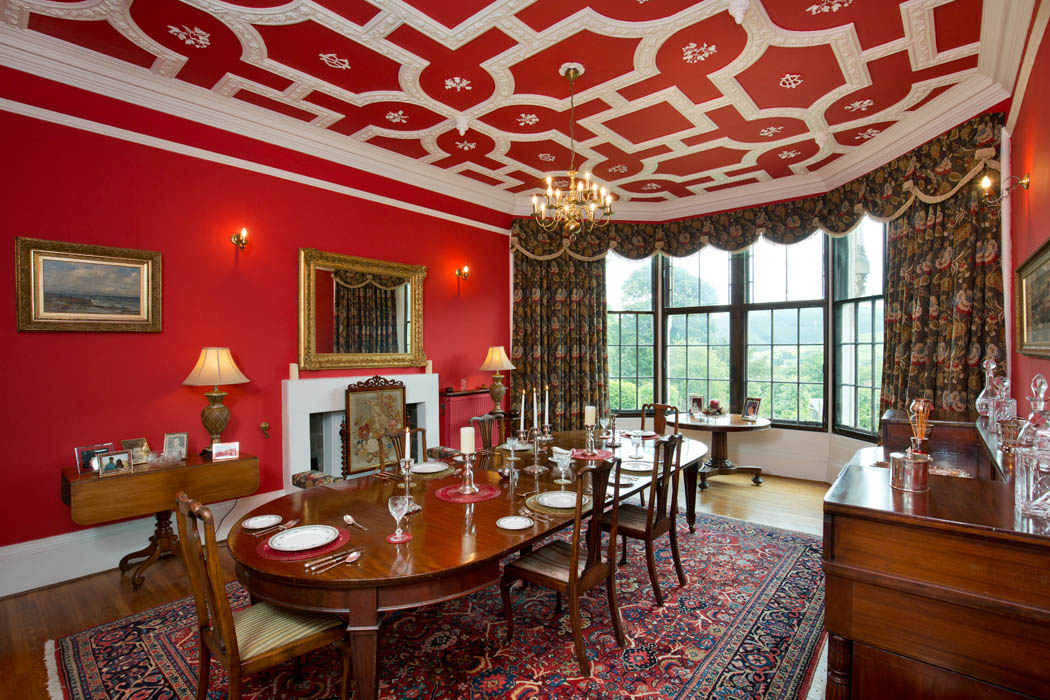
Dining Room, The Kirna, 2018

Of special architectural note is the main entrance and heavily decorated (sculpted) elevation featuring a central flight of ashlar steps leading to a polygonal, arcaded loggia entrance area which is supported by two rope-moulded arches. Immediately above the entrance is the first floor with prominent chequered detail between the band courses, and a repeat of the rope moulding around the windows. The second floor features a turret with two finialled dormers. The Kirna shares many of these design elements with another F T Pilkington building originally known as Craigend Park in Edinburgh, designed and built for William Christie between 1867 and 1869, a "Glover and Breeches Maker" (tailor) at 16 George Street who is believed to have sourced much of his material from the Ballantyne mills.

Designs of The Kirna were exhibited at the Royal Scottish Academy in 1867. The subsequent review in The Builder noted that "Pilkington is never commonplace, though frequently wild and eccentric". The Kirna was praised as "a pleasing example of the modern style Gothic as applied to domestic purposes: abundance of light is given, and variety is secured without violent contrast".

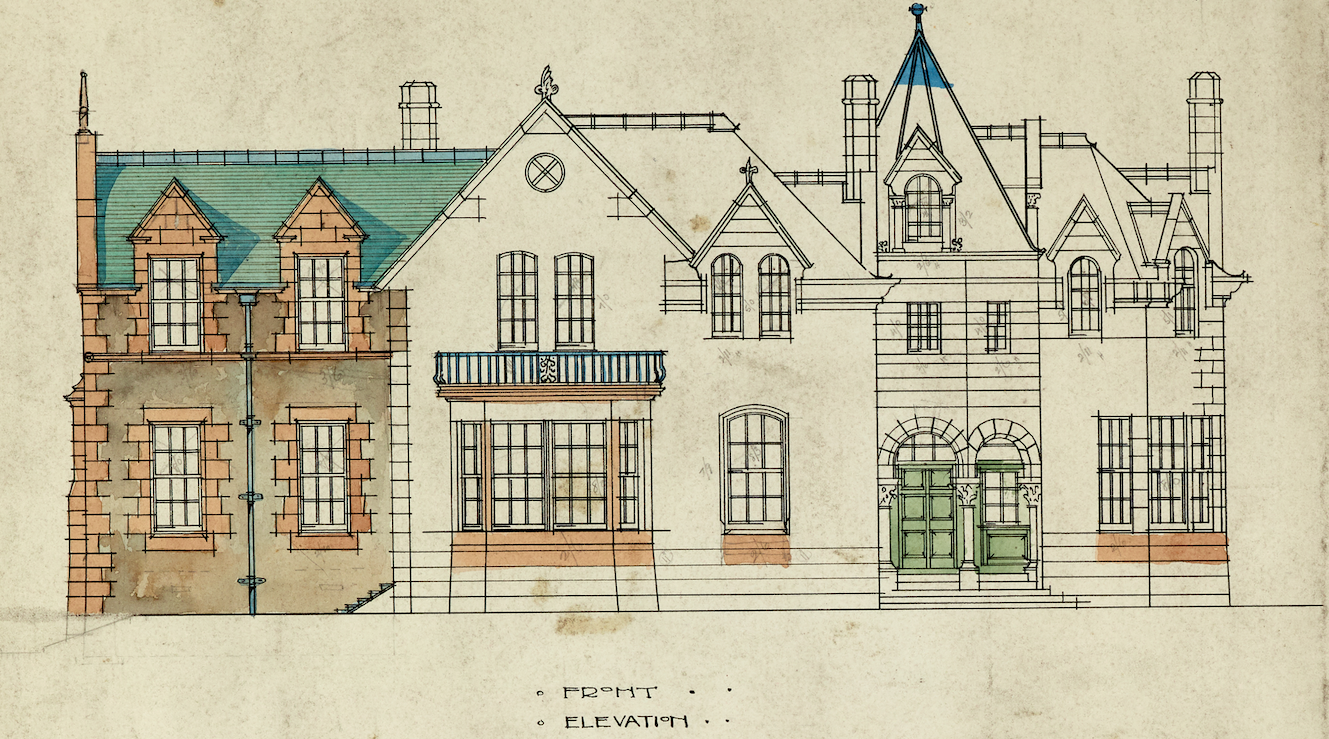
Final design of addition, The Kirna, 1903

Drawings of alterations dated 1903 by James Jerdan (architect at 12 Castle Street, Edinburgh), indicate the addition of a coal chute and "heating chamber" area located beside the main building. The 1903 alterations included the addition of a 'boudoir' (now game room) to the west gable, and a bedroom on the first floor.

The boundary wall and a glass house still survive. The entrance gates were likely removed during the war in 1941 when the government passed an order compulsorily requisitioning all post-1850 iron gates and railings for the war effort. The deed explicitly provided for The Kirna to draw its domestic water from the Kirna Burn until such time as a reservoir was constructed to supply the Estate of Pirn, and to source stone from Purveshill quarries.

== Architectural significance ==
The Kirna is recognised as one of the most architecturally significant Victorian villas in Scotland and an important example of the domestic work of Scottish architect Frederick Thomas Pilkington. Designed during the height of Pilkington’s career, the villa demonstrates many of the characteristics for which he became known, including asymmetrical composition, complex rooflines, and the integration of towers and varied projections. These features reflect Pilkington’s distinctive interpretation of the Scottish Baronial style.

The building’s architectural importance is formally recognised through its designation as a Category A listed building by Historic Environment Scotland. The listing highlights the villa’s exceptional architectural quality, its well-preserved original features, and its importance as a representative example of Pilkington’s domestic architecture.

Architectural historians have identified Pilkington as one of the leading Scottish architects of the later nineteenth century, particularly noted for his inventive and highly individual domestic buildings, placing his work among the most distinctive domestic architecture of Victorian Scotland.. His villas were often commissioned by prosperous industrialists and were designed to convey both status and aesthetic refinement. The Kirna reflects these broader architectural and social trends during Scotland’s Victorian industrial expansion. The villa also contributes to the architectural character and historical development of Walkerburn, and its role in the Scottish textile industry. Its scale, design, and prominent setting distinguish it from surrounding buildings and reinforce its status as one of the most important historic residences in the Scottish Border.

== Comparative significance ==
The Kirna is a representative example of Frederick Thomas Pilkington’s domestic architecture from the late 1860s and occupies a distinct position within his body of work. The building illustrates Pilkington’s application of Ruskinian Gothic and Venetian Romanesque design principles in a rural setting in the Scottish Borders.

The Kirna’s integration into the Ballantyne family’s coordinated villa development in Walkerburn gives it additional contextual significance. In the broader context of late-19th-century Scottish villa architecture, The Kirna is a well-preserved example of Pilkington’s mature domestic work.

When compared with other villas by Pilkington, The Kirna shows a combination of elements that place it squarely within his stylistic framework while also highlighting meaningful differences:

- Craigend Park (Kingston House, Edinburgh, 1867-69) shares the use of a deep entrance loggia, rope-moulded arches, polychrome stone banding, and a corner tower. The Kirna adapts these features to a less formal, rural site, resulting in a more vertical profile that responds to its setting overlooking the Tweed Valley.
- Stoneyhill (Walkerburn, 1868), also for the Ballantyne family, forms part of the same planned group of villas in the village. Stoneyhill incorporates early French Gothic and Moorish elements, while The Kirna exhibits a more Ruskinian Gothic style.
- Egremont (38 Dick Place, Edinburgh, 1864-70) and Inchglass (Crieff, 1854) reflect earlier iterations of Pilkington’s towered villa form and decorative approach. The Kirna reflects the further development of these concepts, combining Scots Baronial with Venetian Romanesque detailing.

== History ==
=== Construction ===
George Ballantyne (1836-1924), third son of Henry Ballantyne (1802-1865), acquired the site for The Kirna from Alexander Horsburgh (1840-1911) of Horsburgh in September of 1867. The villa was built between 1866 and 1867 by George Wilkie (1821-1892) of Hayfield Villa, Peebles. Curiously, George had started the construction of The Kirna in May of 1866 and had already completed the construction of the house, boundary walls and driveway by the time the site was formally acquired. The deed was extraordinarily specific in terms of prohibited uses of the site - "distillery, brewery, manufactory of soot or blood, candleworks, slaughterhouse, smithy, foundry, steam engine, nor any manufactory or chemical preparation".

=== Notable Owners ===
George Ballantyne and his family owned and occupied The Kirna between 1867 and 1880 when he sold the property to his brother David Ballantyne (1825-1912). David let The Kirna, fully furnished, until 1888 when he auctioned off the furniture and sold the property to Marian Currie (1830-1903, née Upwood), widow of Charles Currie (1829-1878), son of Sir Frederick Currie, 1st Baronet .

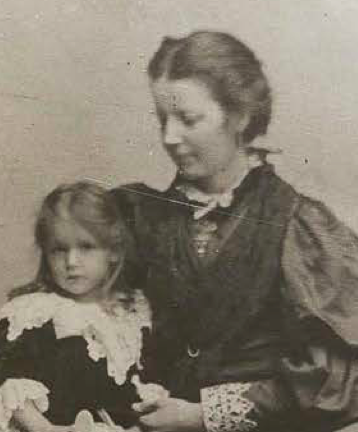
"Kitty" and daughter Catherine Ann, at Grangehill from 1903 to 1919 (photo ca.1899)

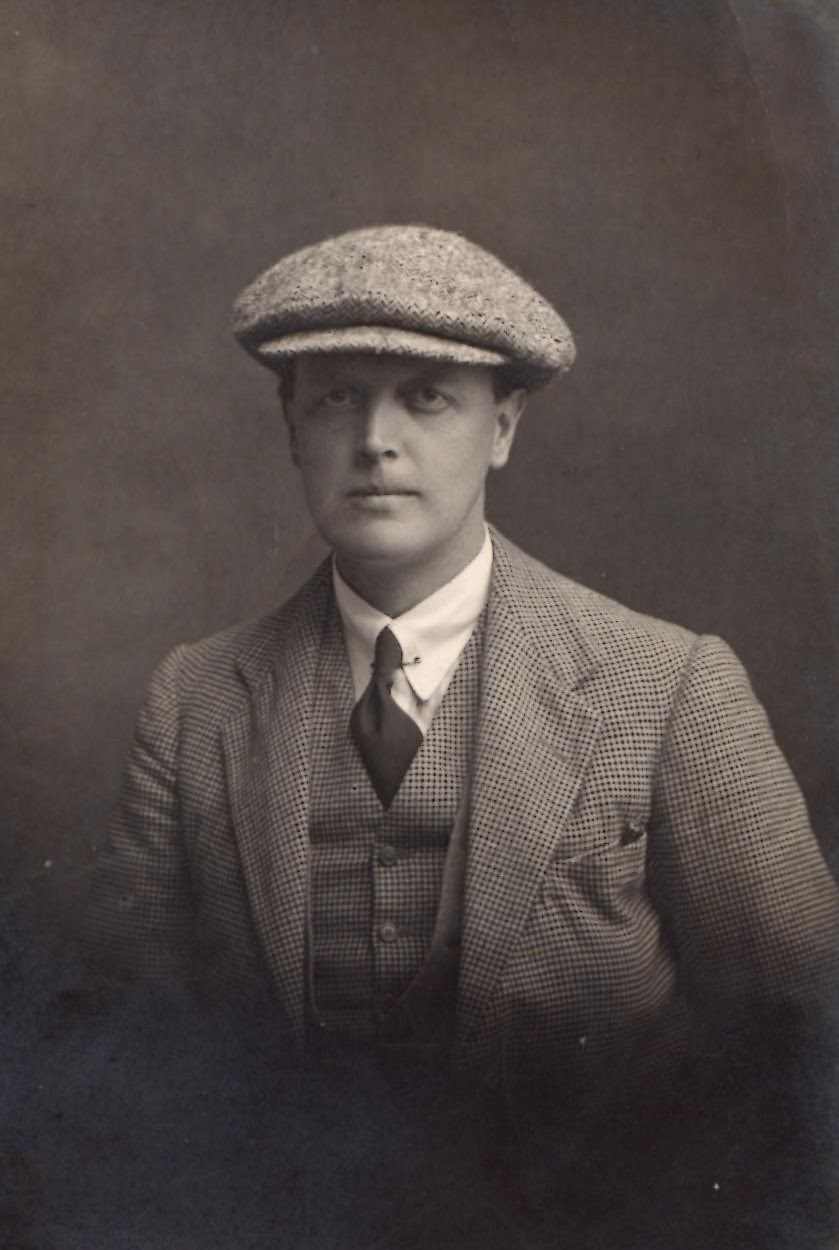
Colin Ballantyne, at The Kirna from 1919 to 1941 (photo ca.1910)

Marion Currie remained at The Kirna until she died in 1903 (Note: During her residency Marian Currie placed The Kirna in the names of her son (Harry) and daughter (Lucy) in 1892) and the property was sold to Katherine "Kitty" Hamilton Bruce (1863-1928), widow of Robert Thomas Hamilton Bruce (1848-1899), 3rd son of Lt. Col. Walter Hamilton Tyndall Bruce of Grandhill and Falkland (1788-1874). Kitty was the daughter of Simon Somerville (Tae) Laurie (1829-1909), a Scottish educator. Kitty owned The Kirna (named Grangehill at that time) for sixteen years before selling to Colin Ballantyne (1879-1942), son of John Ballantyne (1829-1909), in 1919 upon his return from the 1914-1918 War where he served as a captain with the 8th Battalion, The Royal Scots. Colin Ballantyne continued to own the property until just before his death in 1942. He was the third and final member of the Ballantyne family to have owned The Kirna.

Since 1941 The Kirna has had 9 owners. (Note: Emily Skinner ('41-48), James Forbes ('48-53), Winnifred and Henry Pearson Taylor Smith, woollen merchant ('53-57), Peter Rodger ('57-59), James Fraser ('59-81), John Rapley ('81-91), Peter Hammond ('91-92). Julian Osborne, solicitor ('92-2018), Alan & Desa Facey ('18-date))

=== George, The Kirna, and New Zealand ===
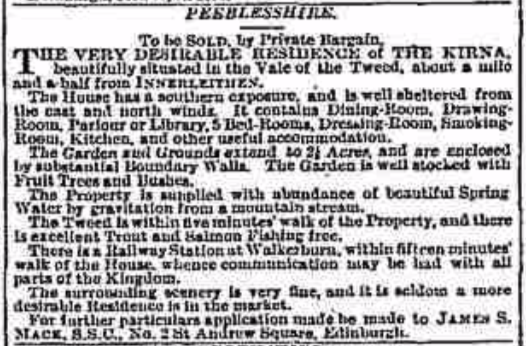
For Sale advertisement, The Scotsman 15 April 1871

Between 1870 and 1872 George secured two personal loans amounting to £800 (£97,000 in 2020) (Note: 2020 equivalent based on CPI) using The Kirna as collateral. George advertised The Kirna for sale in April 1871 after the death of his three-year-old son Henry George Tait (1867-1870), and when it did not sell he advertised it to let, furnished, by the year. In 1874 he mortgaged The Kirna for £1,000 (£116,000 in 2020) through the Scottish Union & National Insurance Co. and used a portion of the proceeds to repay £500 of his outstanding personal loans. In 1878 The Kirna was put up for auction in Peebles but it did not sell. The remainder of his personal loan amount was repaid in 1879.

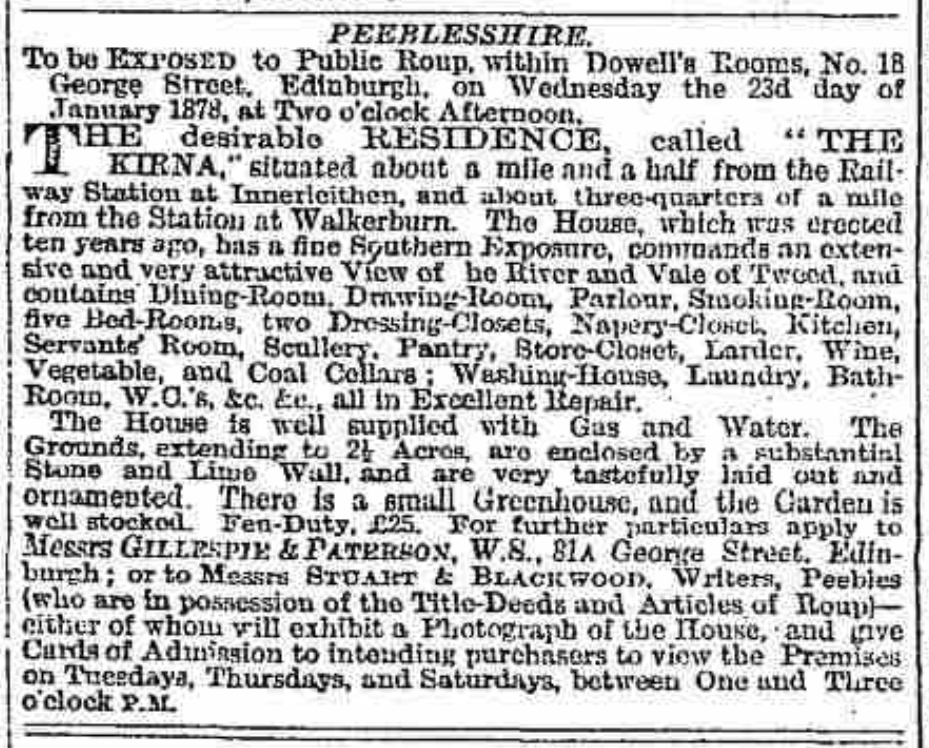
For Auction advertisement, The Scotsman 5 January 1878

George sold The Kirna to his brother David in 1880 for £2,100 (£258,000 in 2020), roughly what he originally paid George Wilkie to build it for, when he emigrated to New Zealand, notionally to enter the wool-buying business to supply the requirements of Henry Ballantyne's mills. George did not simply sell privately to David - he put The Kirna up for Public Roup and Sale on 17th March 1880. It was purchased by Charles Henderson, Solicitor, South Court Edinburgh on behalf of David Ballantyne, confirmed in the Minute of Enactment at the Roup. David already owned a property (Sunnybrae) in Walkerburn at that time, suggesting that his purchase of The Kirna was designed to facilitate George's departure and possibly his exit from Henry Ballantyne's business. George used the proceeds of the sale to discharge his £1,000 mortgage.

=== Coach house ===
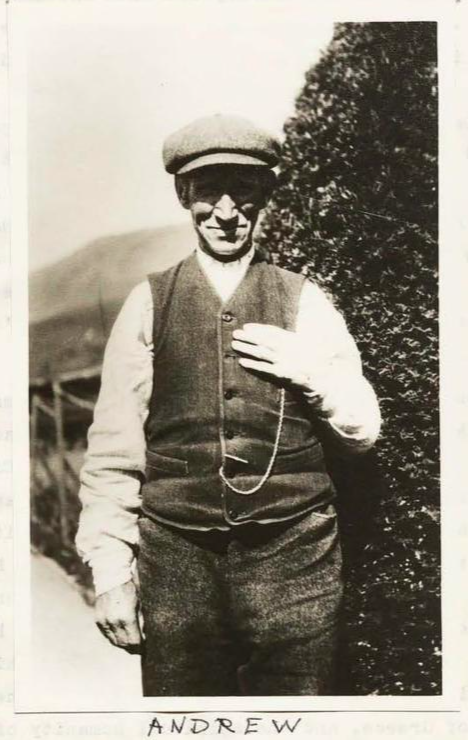
Andrew Newall, gardener, first resident at Kirna's coach house (photo ca.1903)

The Kirna includes a separate stable block and coach house rather than a traditional entrance lodge. It is believed that Marian Currie commissioned the coach house some time between 1890 and 1900. An 1877 photograph of The Kirna does not show the coach house, and an 1878 for-sale advertisement makes no mention of a coach house. The 1888 disposition recording the sale of The Kirna to Marian Currie also makes no reference to a second dwelling on the property. The 1891 Census includes a "coachman" named Andrew Newall (1852-1935) residing at Kirna House. The following 1901 Census records Andrew, now "gardener", living in the coach house. And a 1903 advertisement in the Scotsman mentions "stable, coach house, and coachman's house".

Late 19th century maps indicate that the current driveway for the coach house was a road extending to the land on Purvishill, and the whinstone quarries to the north east of the ancient terraces. George Ballantyne had been granted only a servitude right of use over it, not ownership, thereby preserving Horsburgh's ability to continue using it to access his quarries and Purveshill lands.

In 1923, architect William James Walker Todd (partner in J M Dick Peddie & W J Walker Todd) made alterations to the stable and coach house for Colin Ballantyne, including converting a section of the stable to a (second) bedroom and a bathroom.

The Kirna and the coach house were formally separated in 1948 when Emily Skinner sold The Kirna to James Forbes who then proceeded to sell the coach house to William Johnson, an architect from Edinburgh.

=== Property name ===
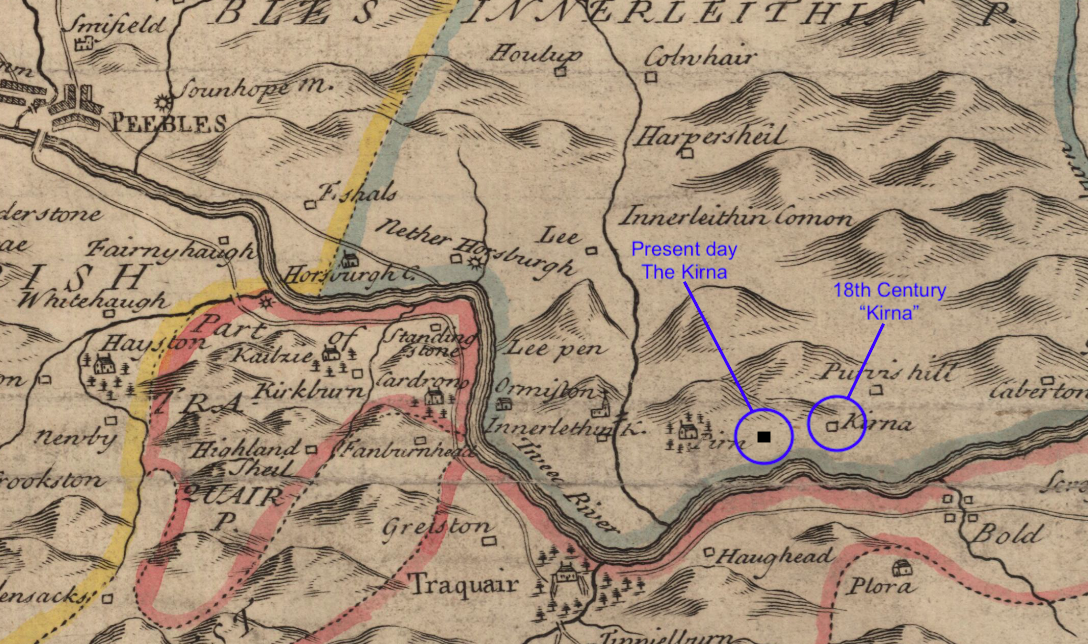
Map showing location of a property named Kirna in Innerleithen Parish (1741)

At various times The Kirna has also been referred to as Kirnie House or Kirna/Kerna House, amongst others. All three names are an obvious connection to its location at the base of Kirnie Law hill, nearby Kirnie Tower, and another house in the vicinity named Kirna believed to have existed in the 18th century.

Ordnance Survey historical maps published in 1897, 1898 and 1909 record the property as Kirnie House.

The property was once referred to as The Chirney during its construction in 1866, but this is believed to have been a simple misspelling.

Between 1903 and 1919 before it was sold to Colin Ballantyne, The Kirna was known as Grangehill. The owner at that time, Katherine "Kitty" Hamilton Bruce, is known to have resided at The Grange in Dornoch and at Grange Dell in Penicuik, demonstrating a predilection for names including 'Grange'.

The current name, Kirna House, may have come about when the Post Office needed to be able to distinguish between the villa and the coach house (now Kirna Lodge) when the latter was sold as a separate property in 1948.

=== Kirna 'firsts' ===
The earliest known photograph of The Kirna dates to approximately 1867–1871 in a collection by royal photographer George Washington Wilson where the property is captured in the background of the town of Innerleithen. The collection incorrectly cites 1877 as the year of the photograph because the 1871 property named Runic Cross on Waverley Road, Innerleithen is not present in the photograph and The Kirna, completed in 1867, is clearly visible.

In August 1871 the gardener (named Jullien) to George Ballantyne committed suicide, allegedly by cutting his own throat after a long period of illness.

The Kirna would have been one of the first houses in Walkerburn to be built with gas lighting as standard. It was tied in to the Innerleithen gas works on Princes Street which supplied Walkerburn from 1860. The first gas street lamps were installed in Walkerburn in 1878.

The alterations of 1903 added a further four fireplaces and a coal-fired hot water boiler in the newly constructed "heating chamber". Two 1977 for-sale advertisements indicate the presence of an oil fired hot water system. Gas wall heaters were installed in most rooms in the early 1980s, and hot water was heated by an AGA with an integrated boiler in the kitchen. Modern gas-fired central heating was first installed in approximately 1993.

The first telephones were installed in Walkerburn in 1891 and in approximately 1907, Katherine "Kitty" Hamilton Bruce was the first proprietor of The Kirna (then Grangehill) to have enjoyed a magneto telephone mounted on the wall out of sight in the pantry. The telephone would likely have been an NTC No. 1 (a.k.a. GPO No. 59) based on the first-hand account of Catherine Ann Hamilton Bruce (1895-1978), daughter of Kitty. When Colin Ballantyne acquired The Kirna in 1919 his subscriber number was 16 and he could reach his mother at Stoneyhill on number 12, his brother John King Ballantyne at Nether Caberston (Note: Now known as Windlestraw, built in 1906) on number 3, his cousin John Alexander at Sunnybrae on number 14, and the Walkerburn Co-operative Society on number 4, amongst others.

In the spring of 1943, Colin Ballantyne participated in Scotland's Gardens scheme and opened The Kirna's gardens to the public to view its rhodondendrons and daffodils and other spring flowers. Colin Ballantyne was an avid horticulturalist and president of the Innerleithen & Traquair Flower and Vegetable Association.

== Location ==
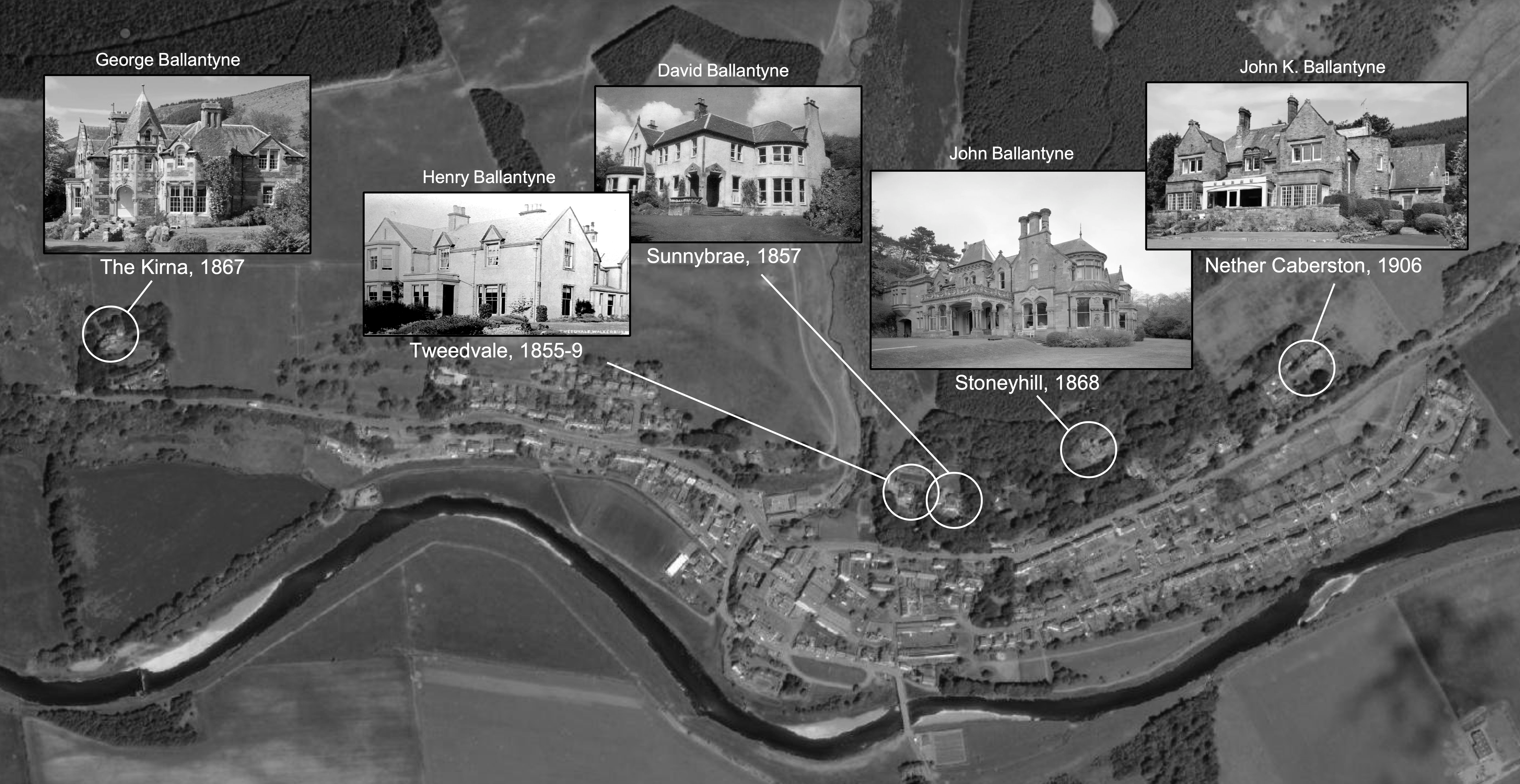
Locations of Ballantyne Villas in Walkerburn

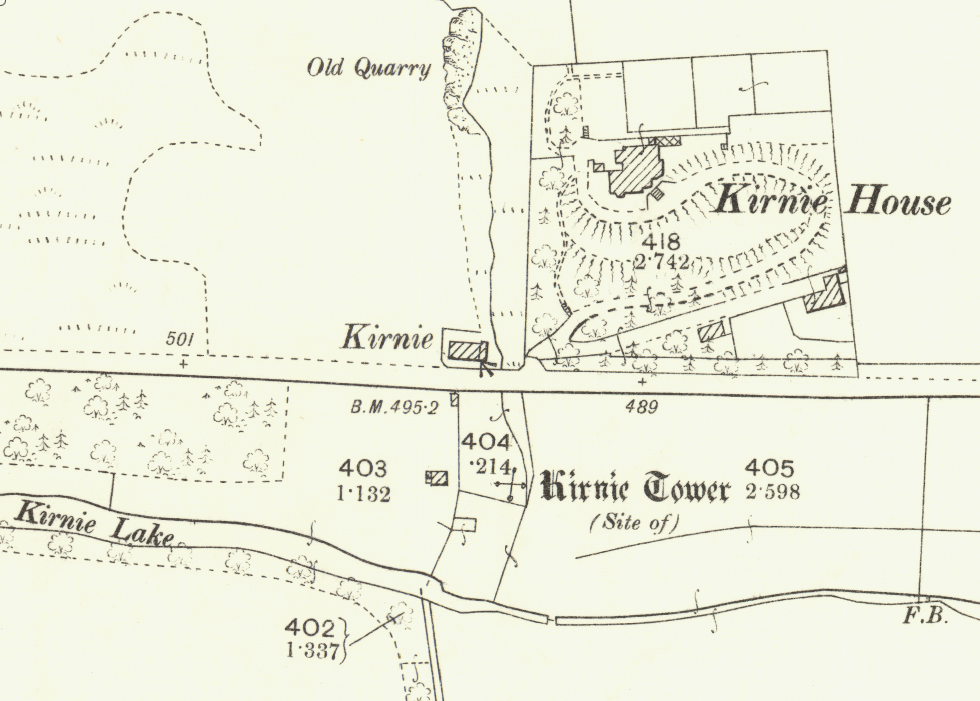
OS Map, Peebles-shire XIV.14, 1898 (Kirnie House, Walkerburn)

The Kirna is situated on Peebles Road, originally Pink Bank, in the valley of the River Tweed, a few hundred metres west of Walkerburn village. Peebles Road was the turnpike road between Galashiels and Peebles which was constructed in circa 1775. It was authorised in the Act of 1768 and was designed to link Peebles with the emerging textile centres in Innerleithen and Walkerburn.

The property is unusual as it stands away from the other three Ballantyne family houses designed by F T Pilkington in Walkerburn (John Ballantyne's house Stoneyhill, David's house Sunnybrae and Henry's former home Tweedvale) but exhibits features found on the other buildings. Other Ballantyne villas in the vicinity during this era included Holylee owned by Major James George Ballantyne (1837-1884), and The Firs (Horsbrugh Terrace, Innerleithen) owned by James Ballantyne (1839-1903).

The Kirna is in close proximity to almost a dozen man-made structures, some dating back to pre-historic times, illustrating the strategic importance to settlers of the Old North throughout history. The site and surrounding lands benefit from ample supplies of fresh water from the Kirna Burn and the Walker Burn, its elevation above the flood plain of the Tweed River, extensive views up and down the Tweed Valley, the south-facing slope of Kirnie Law, and a rich topsoil.

Mid-19th century maps indicate an old whinstone quarry approximately 30 metres beyond the northwest corner of the boundary wall and in the path of the Kirna Burn that travels along the west boundary wall from Kirnie Law to the Tweed river.

== Nearby structures ==
=== Recent structures ===
==== Kirna farm ====
An 18th century map based on a 1741 survey by William Edgar which was dedicated to Charles Stewart (1697–1764), 5th Earl of Traquair shows a property, likely a farm house, named Kirna approximately 500 metres ENE of the current property, nearby the Walker Burn. Its remains are no longer visible.

The Roy Military Survey of Scotland, 1747-1755 indicates a man-made structure named Kirna located at approximately the same location as the current house, presumably a farm house.

==== Kirna Burn water tank ====
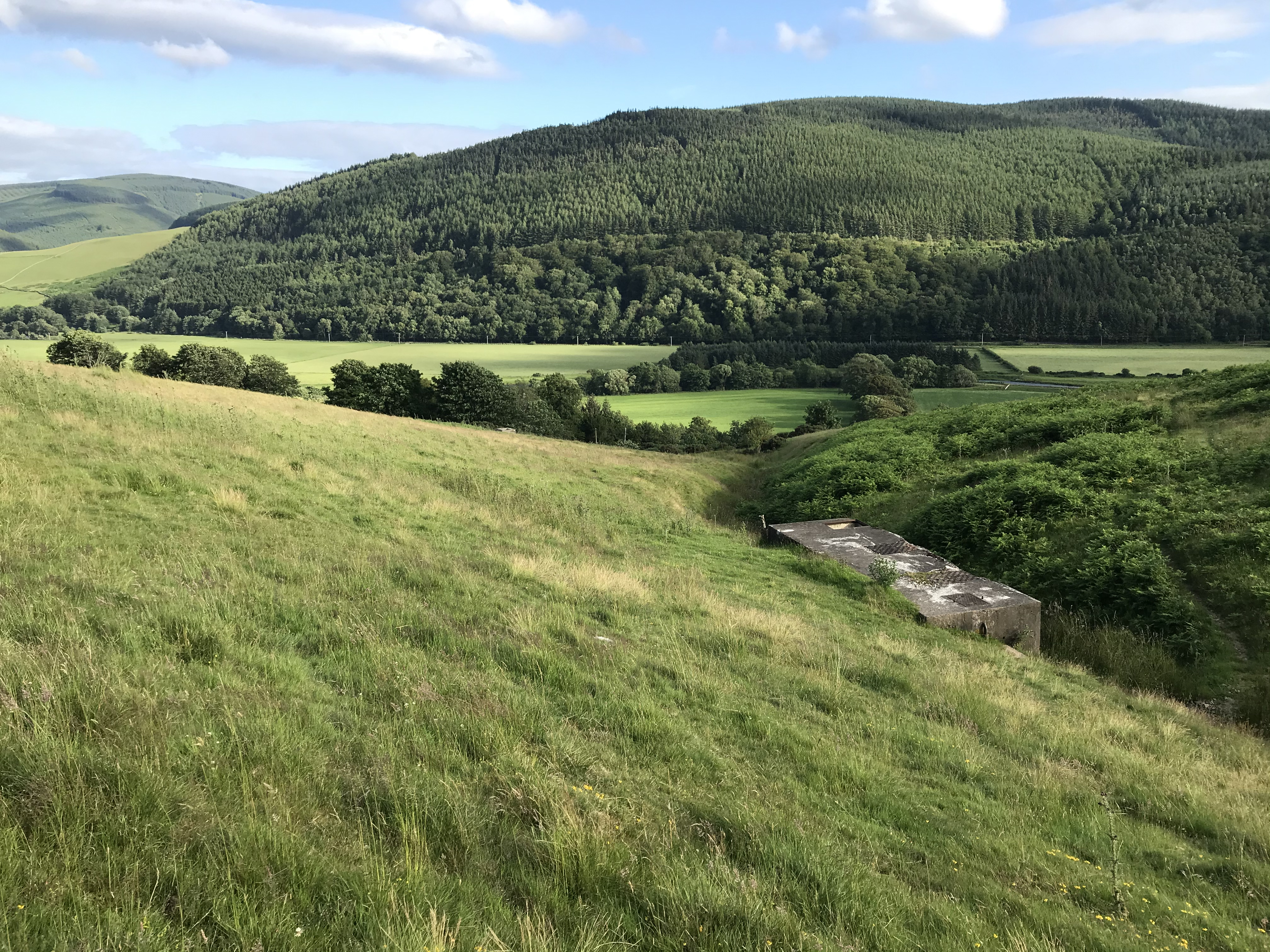
Storage tank on Kirna Burn

A for sale advertisement in The Scotsman published on 15 April 1871, cites "an abundance of beautiful spring water" to The Kirna. It is likely that the water tank positioned upstream from The Kirna on Kirna Burn provided that source of fresh water from 1867 until at least 1961 despite local authorities being required by law to provide water to communities from the 1940s. This tank functioned as an intake for some of Walkerburn and also supplied The Kirna via a dedicated cistern tank (see gallery below) visible just beyond the northern perimeter wall.

==== Kirnie Law reservoir ====
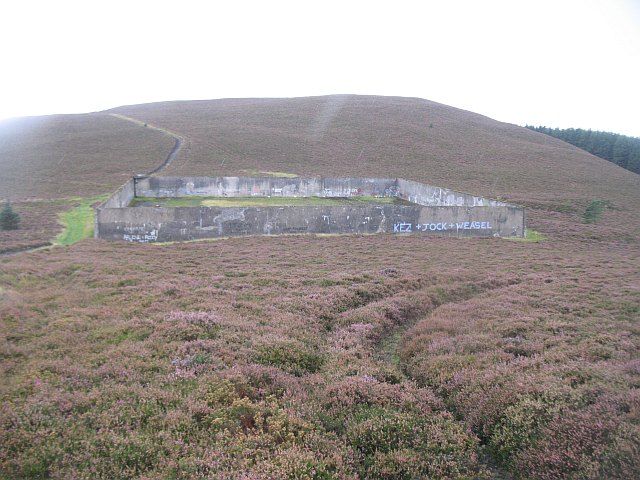
Kirnie Law Reservoir

The Kirna is due south of Kirnie Law Reservoir which was built to provide hydro-electric power for Tweedvale Mill and Tweedholm Mill in Walkerburn, owned by Henry Ballantyne & Sons, Ltd. The project was conceived of and designed by Boving & Co. Ltd. (hydraulic engineers) and became operational in 1922. This was the first working pumped-storage hydro-electric power scheme in the country. It was reported that the scheme cost approximately £100,000 to build with projected savings in coal, oil, and labour of £10,000 per year. The reservoir continued in use until around 1950.

The ferro-concrete reservoir is still substantially intact. Its interior measures 58.5 metres squared by 4.7 metres deep and the walls are 20 centimetres at the top tapering to 35 centimetres at the base. The tank was capable of holding 13.2 million litres of water. There is a surge tank (pumping station) downhill that controlled the water flow to the turbines in the valley.

==== Kirnie Cottage ====
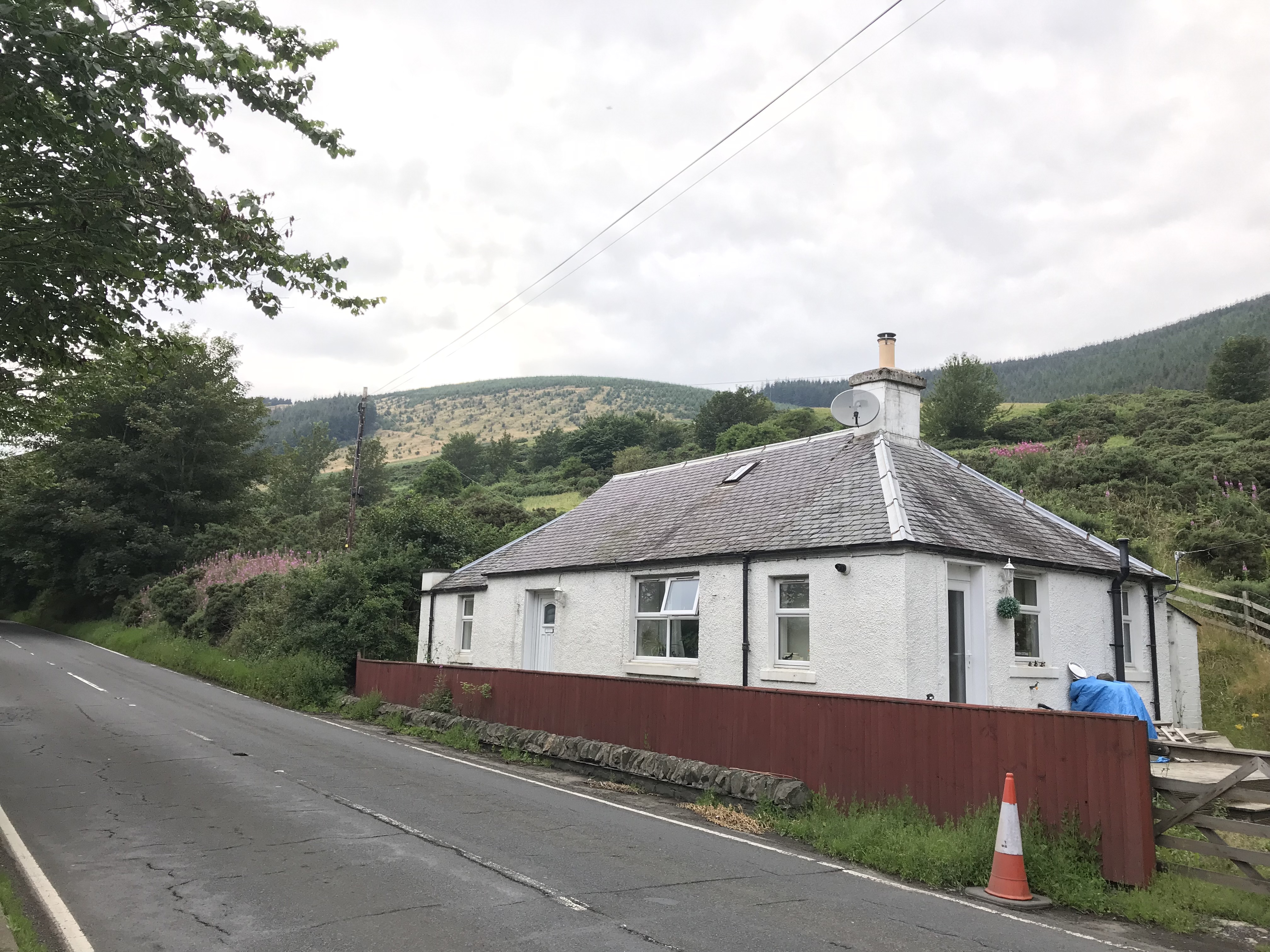
Kirnie Cottage

Ordnance Survey Name Books for the parish of Innerleithen written prior to the construction of The Kirna cite a "one storey house" named Kirnie, property of the Horsburgh family, situated at or near the current site of The Kirna.

It is believed that the house started life as the shepherd's cottage for Pirn House (demolished in early 1950s) and was built by Stirling & Son of Galashiels when they were building the mill houses in Walkerburn for "Captain" Horsburgh.

1841 Census, 1851 Census and 1861 Census data refer to a shepherd named James Tait and his family living at Kirna (or Kirnie).

The cottage has also been variously tagged as Kirna or Kirnie Toll House, however this seems unlikely given the nearby turnpike toll house (est. 1830) in Innerleithen.

Kirnie Cottage was notoriously put up for sale in 2011 by a squatter who tried to sell the cottage for £70,000 without the knowledge of the owner.

==== Kirna Lodge ====
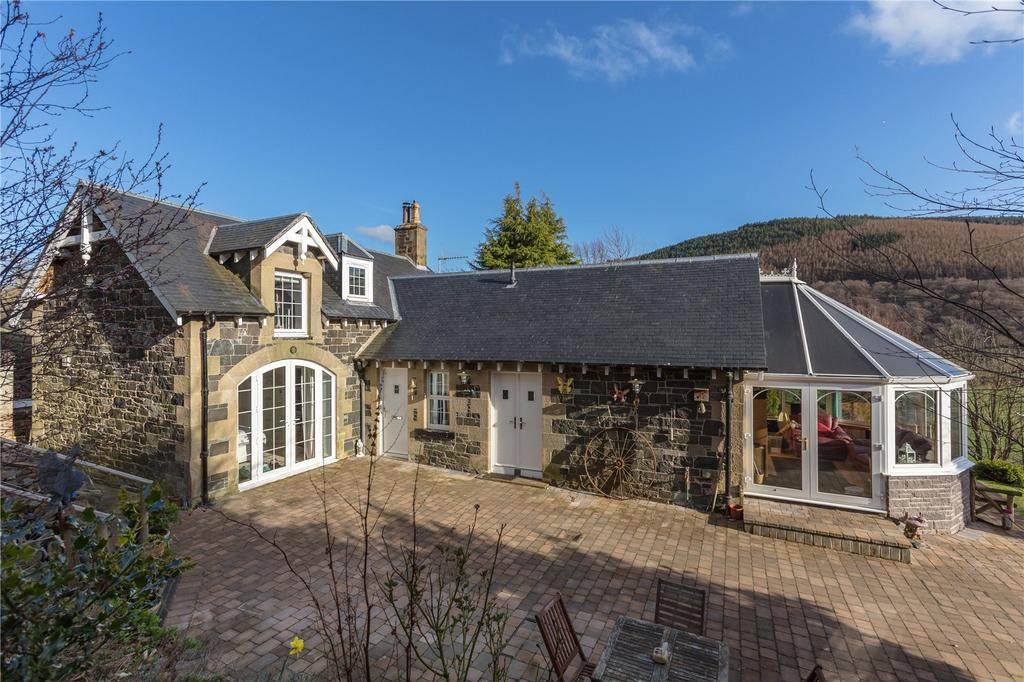
Kirna Lodge

Kirna Lodge is located within the original boundary walls of The Kirna. It started life as the stable and coach house for The Kirna some time between 1888 and 1903. Today, Kirna Lodge is a three-bedroom house overlooking the Tweed Valley, with a conservatory and a four-car garage. The kitchen is now in what used to be the stable in 1923. The original coach house has made way for a principal bedroom and, more recently, a general-purpose room.

The lodge exhibits a flush bracket (OSBM G293) that was used during the Second Geodetic Levelling of Scotland that took place between 1936 and 1952, and was levelled with a height of 157.0421 metres (Note: Ordnance Datum Newlyn)above mean sea level. This bracket was included on the Innerleithen to Duns Common levelling line.

=== Ancient structures ===
==== Kirnie Tower ====
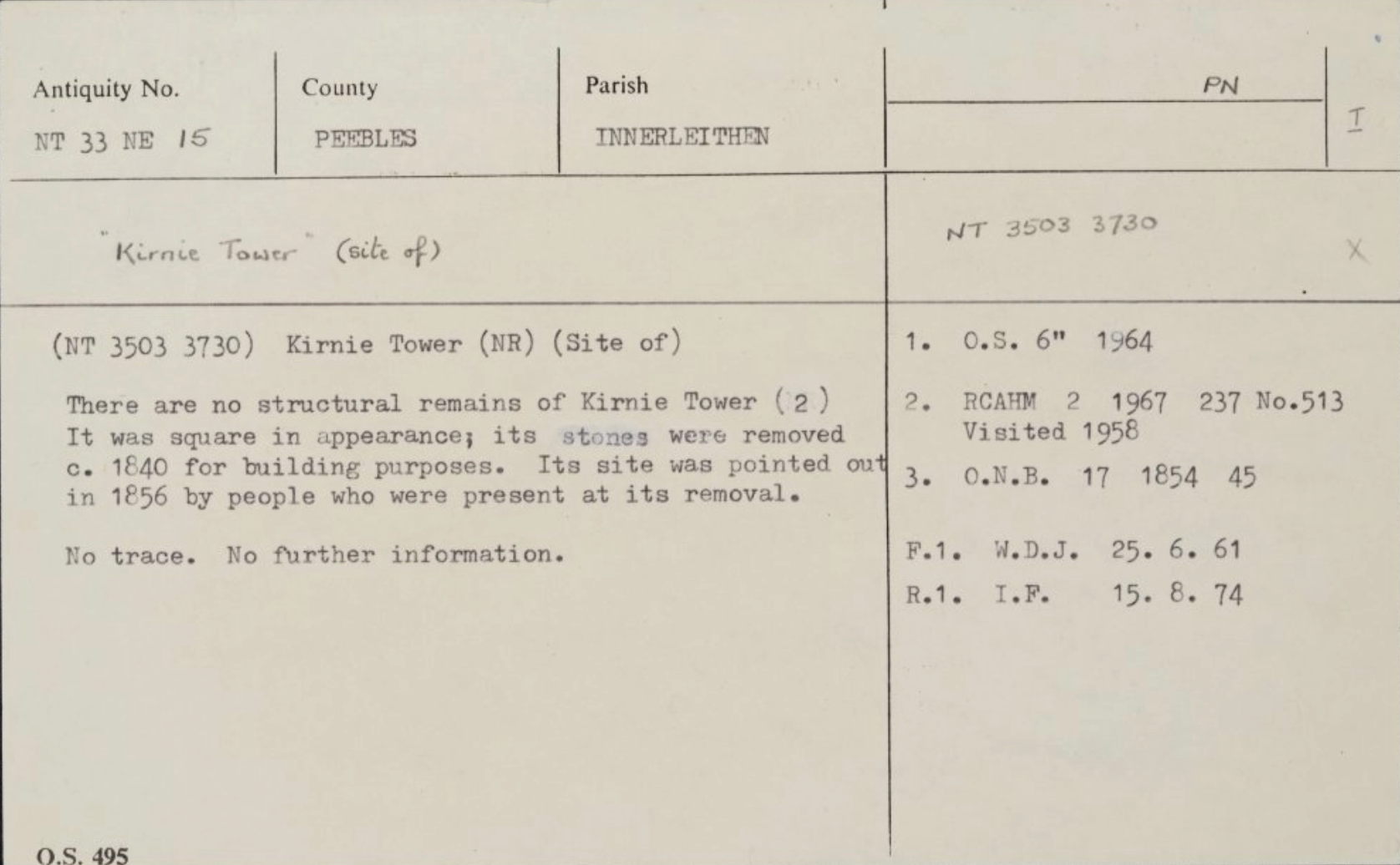
Kirnie Tower, Ordnance Survey index card, 1954

Approximately 80 metres to the south of The Kirna's perimeter wall, across Peebles Road, is the site of Kirnie Tower. Its site was pointed out in 1856 by residents of Walkerburn who were present at its removal in circa 1840 when its stones were removed for building purposes elsewhere on the Horsburgh estate. Long after its dismantlement it was used as a shepherd's hut. Maps published as far back as 1654 refer to "Kirn" or "Kirna" in approximately the location of Kirnie Tower. Ordnance Survey Name Books in the mid-1800s record the structure as "one of the ancient feudal residences erected for the protection of the Borders. It was square in appearance".

A series of these peel towers was built in the 15th century along the Tweed valley from its source to Berwick, as early-warning beacons announcing invasion from the Marches.

==== Romano-british settlement ====
A scooped homestead, measuring 26x23 metres internally, is situated on the steep SW face of Purvis Hill, approximately 200 metres north of The Kirna. The enclosing wall has been largely lost, but the position of the entrance is still visible. Within the walls is a platform large enough to support two timber houses.

==== Prehistoric enclosure ====
Located approximately 270 metres NW of The Kirna is a prehistoric enclosure (settlement). It is recorded as an 'ancient monument forming part of the lands of Caberston' under the Ancient Monuments Act, 1931. The settlement has been mostly destroyed by cultivation, stone-robbing, and the construction of a semi-circular sheepfold, now in ruins. However, sufficient remains to show that it measured about 50 metres N-S by slightly less transversely, and that it was originally enclosed by a wall.

==== Ancient terraces and tower ====
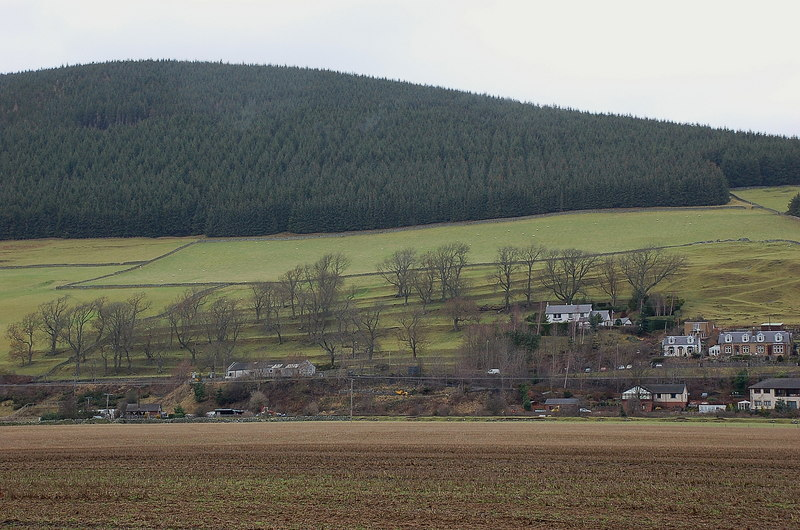
Ancient terraces

The remains of ancient terraces and Purvishill Tower are located approximately 200 metres due west of The Kirna at the base of Purvis Hill. Although they are technically of unknown origin, it is believed that the terraces belong to the Pictish period (600-700AD). Given their unusual scale, character and location, the terraces may have been intended to provide level ground for gardens or orchards, although a more utilitarian agricultural function is also possible. An archaeological evaluation in 2020 suggested that the features originally interpreted as possible cultivation terraces were a series of tracks and paths relating to quarry activity which took place to the N and W of the development area during the 19th and 20th centuries.

== Gallery ==
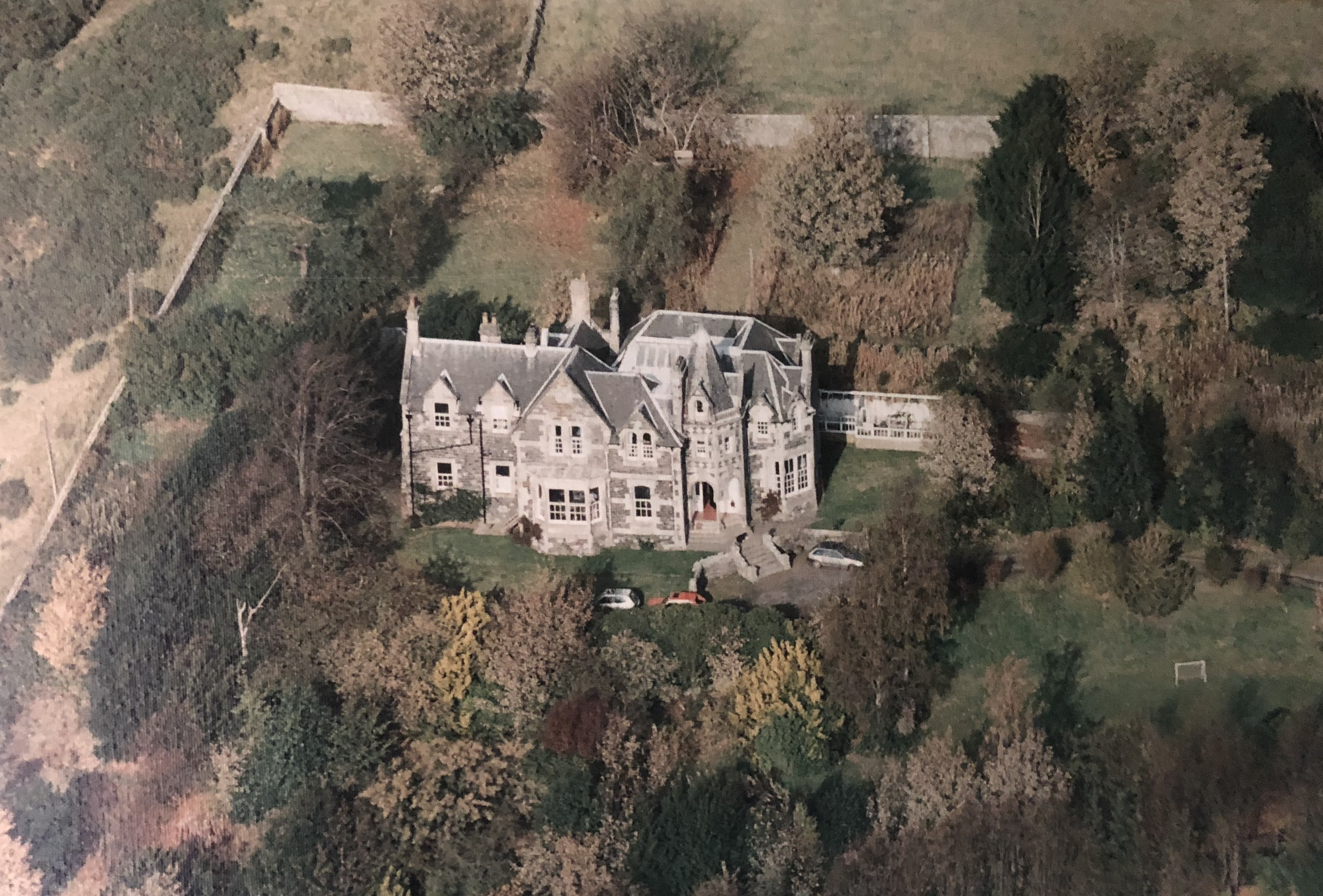
Aerial view, The Kirna, 1990s

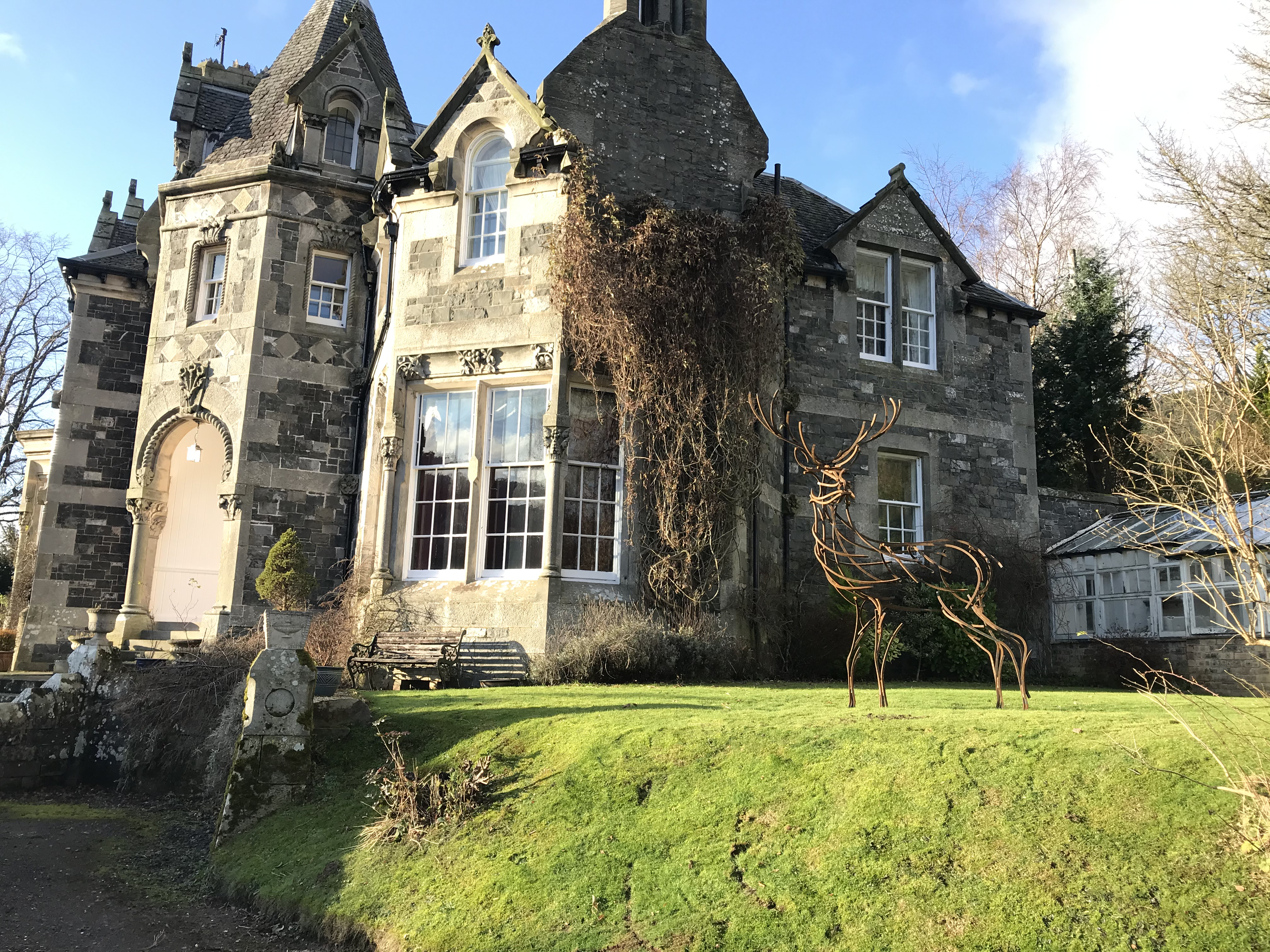
Elevation:east, The Kirna, 2019

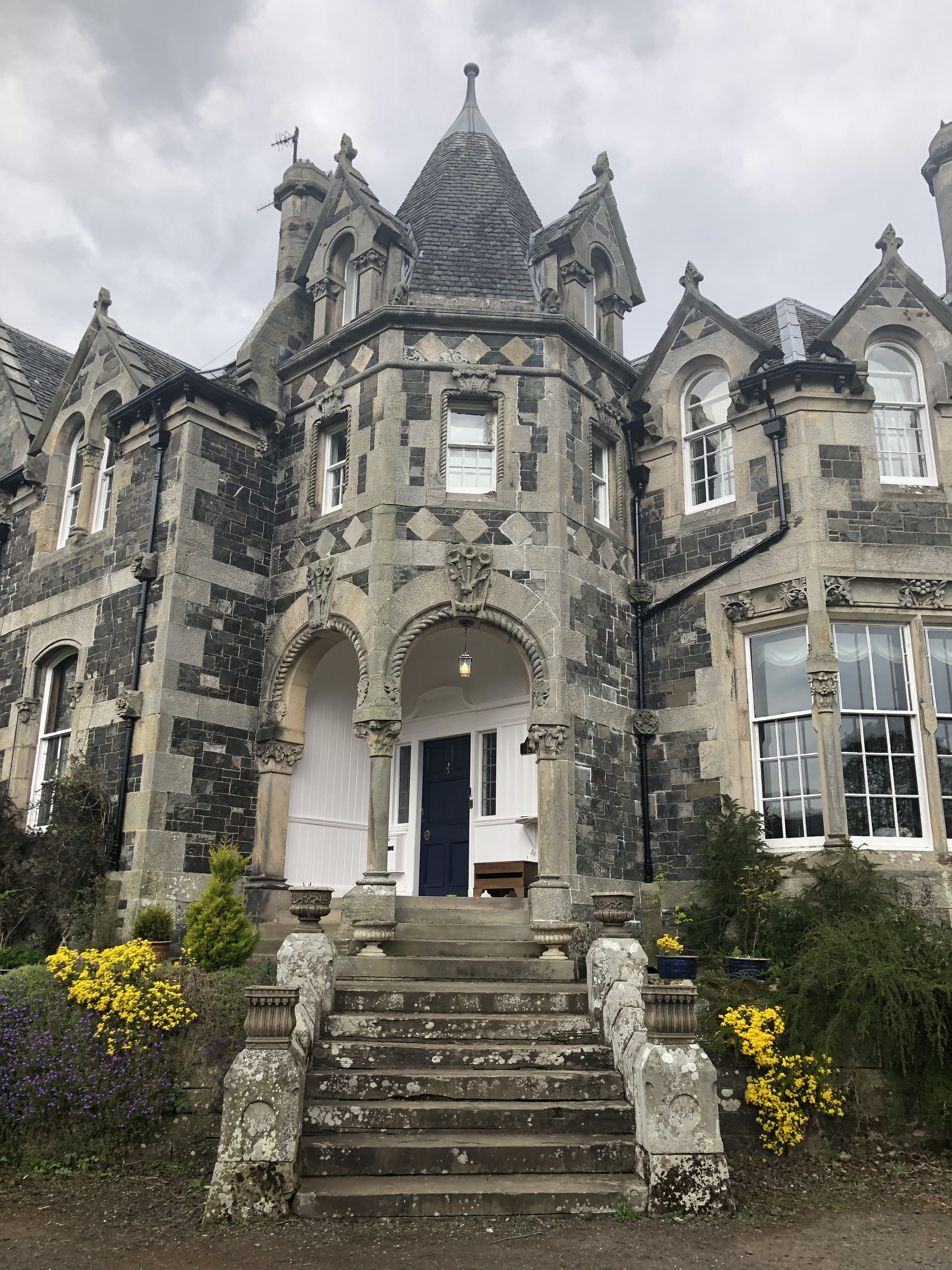
Main entrance, The Kirna, 2019

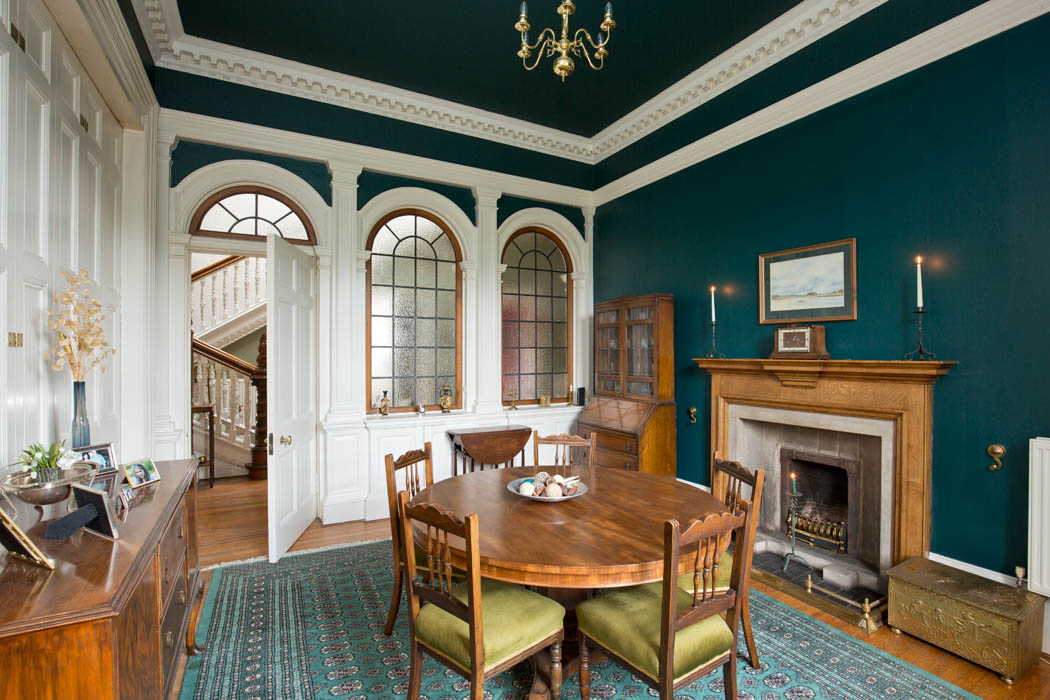
Morning Room, The Kirna, 2018

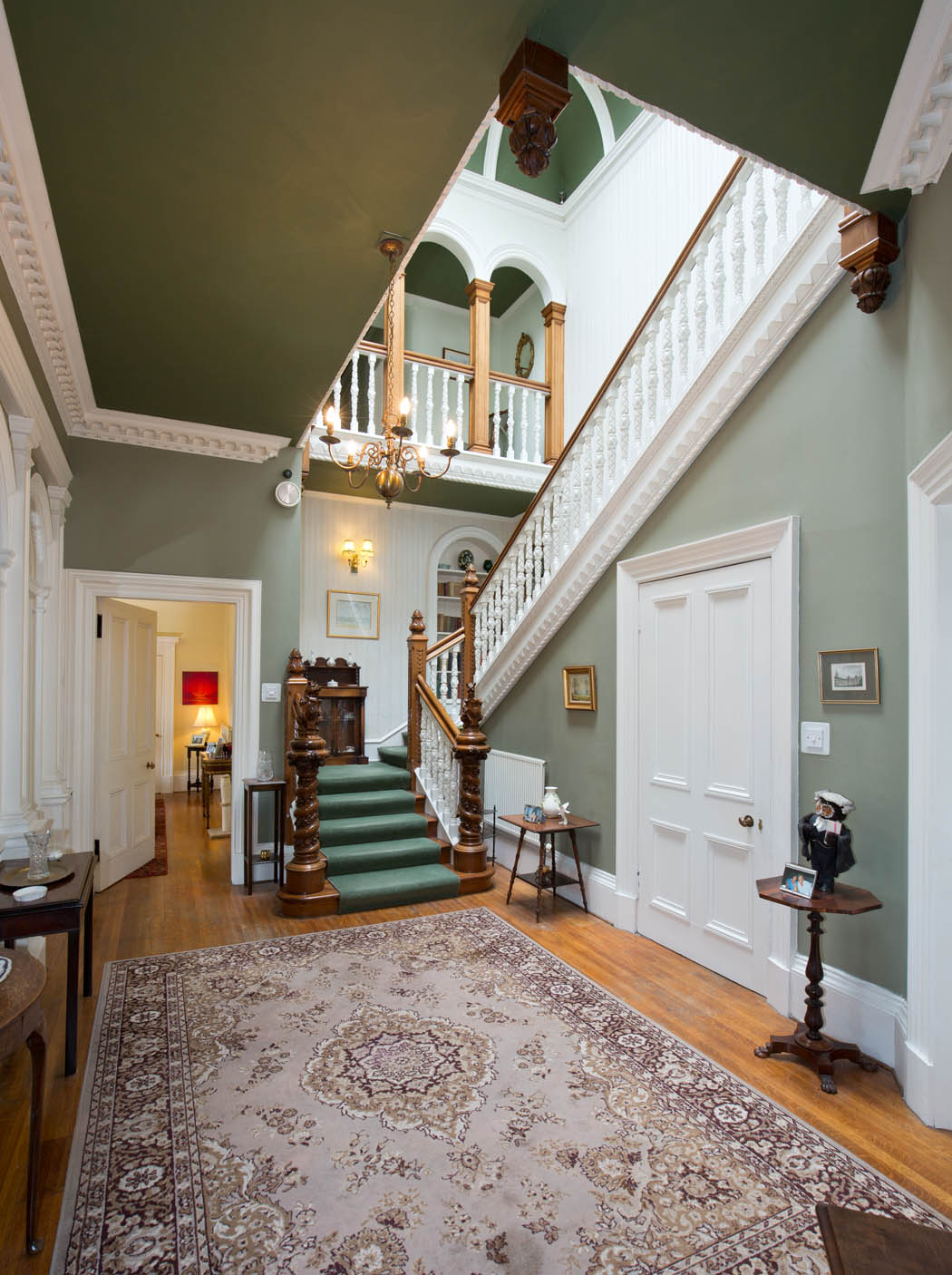
Staircase, The Kirna, 2018

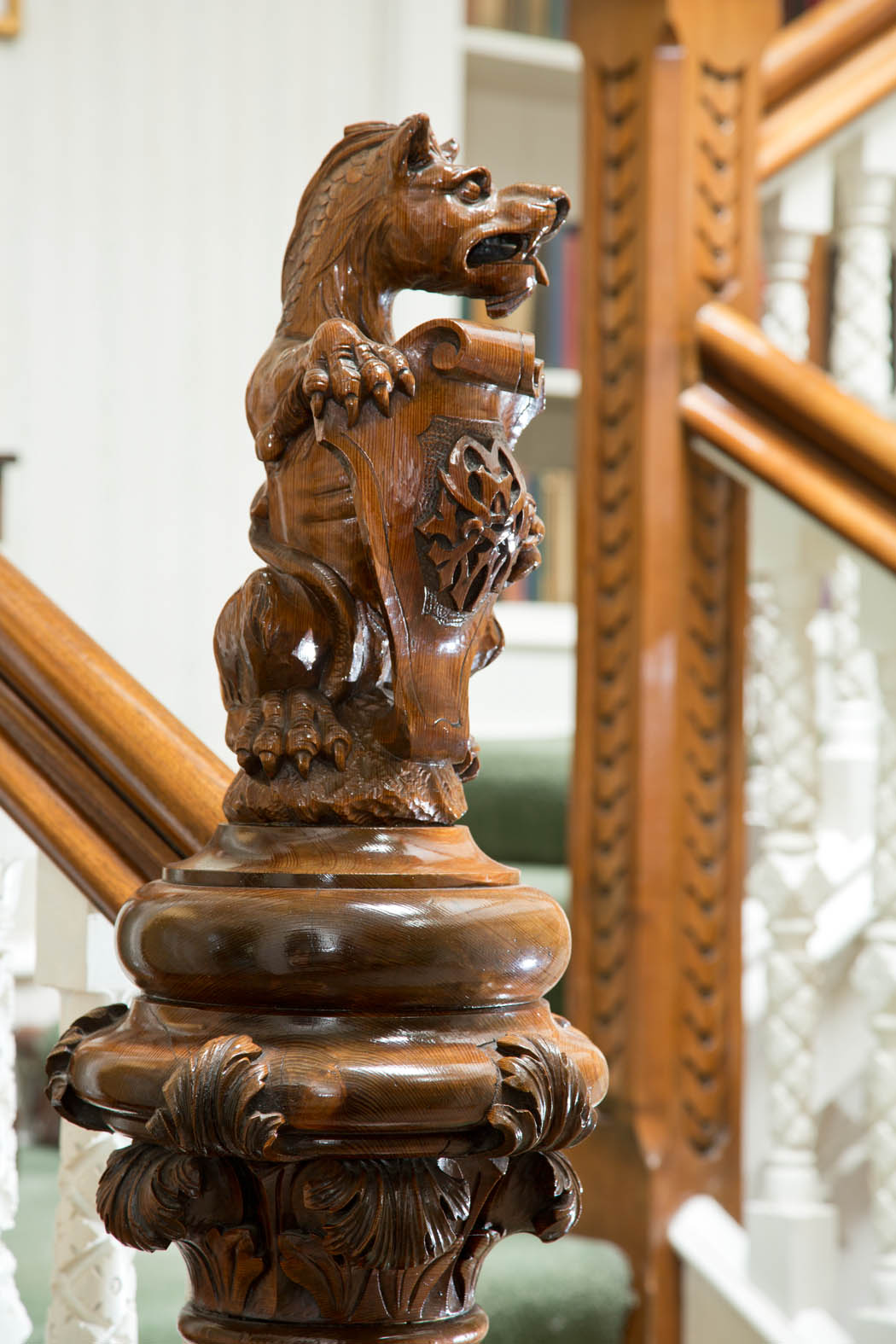
Staircase finial detail, The Kirna, 2018

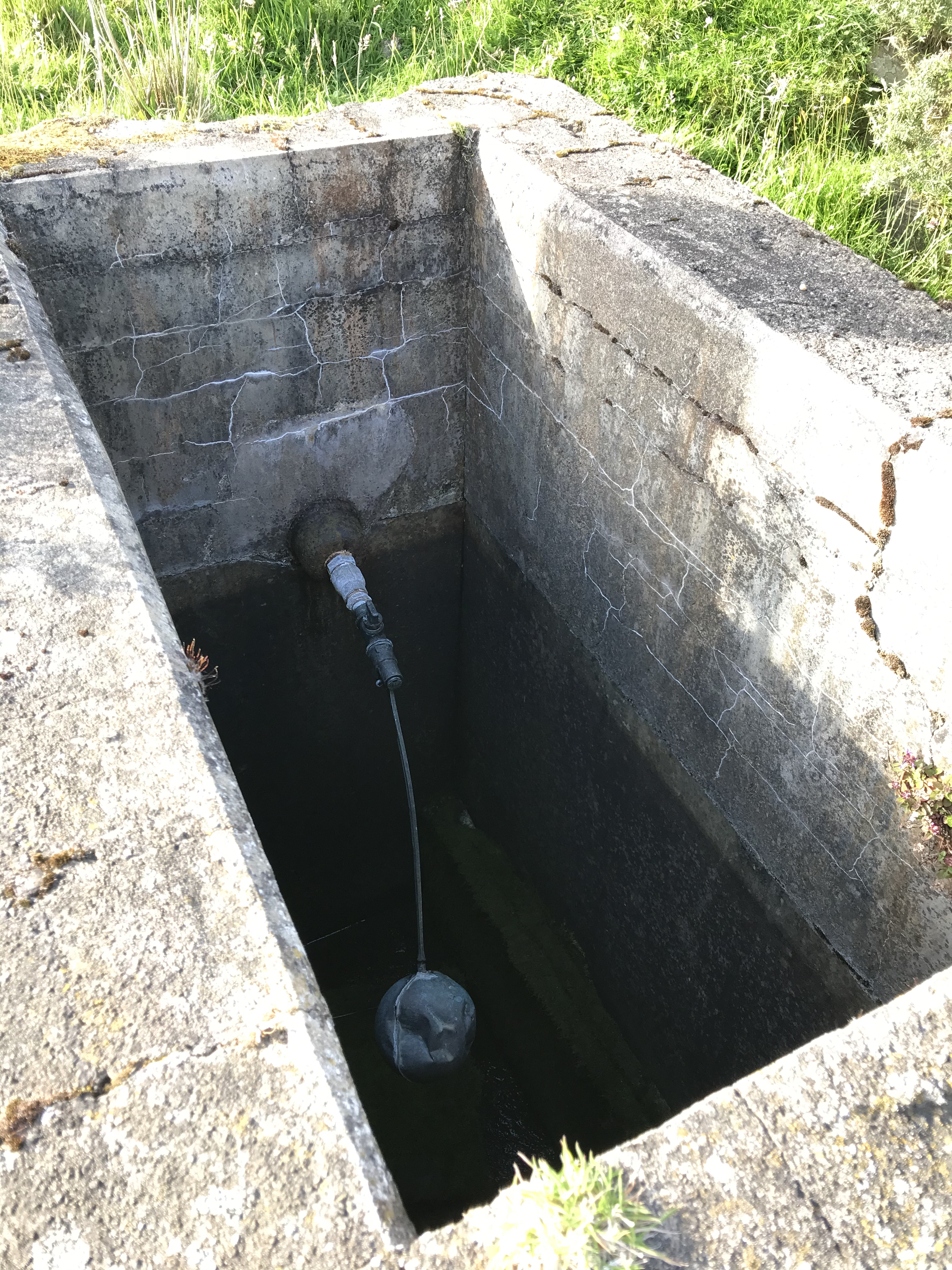
Cistern for The Kirna located on Kirnie Law

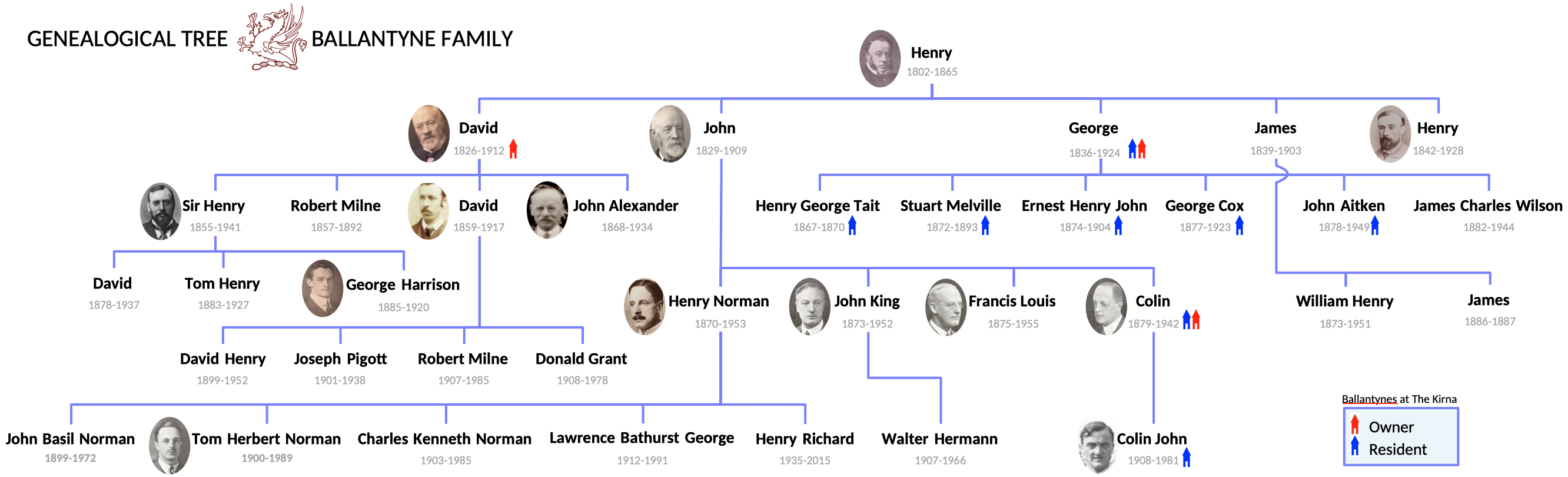
Genealogical Tree of Ballantyne Family

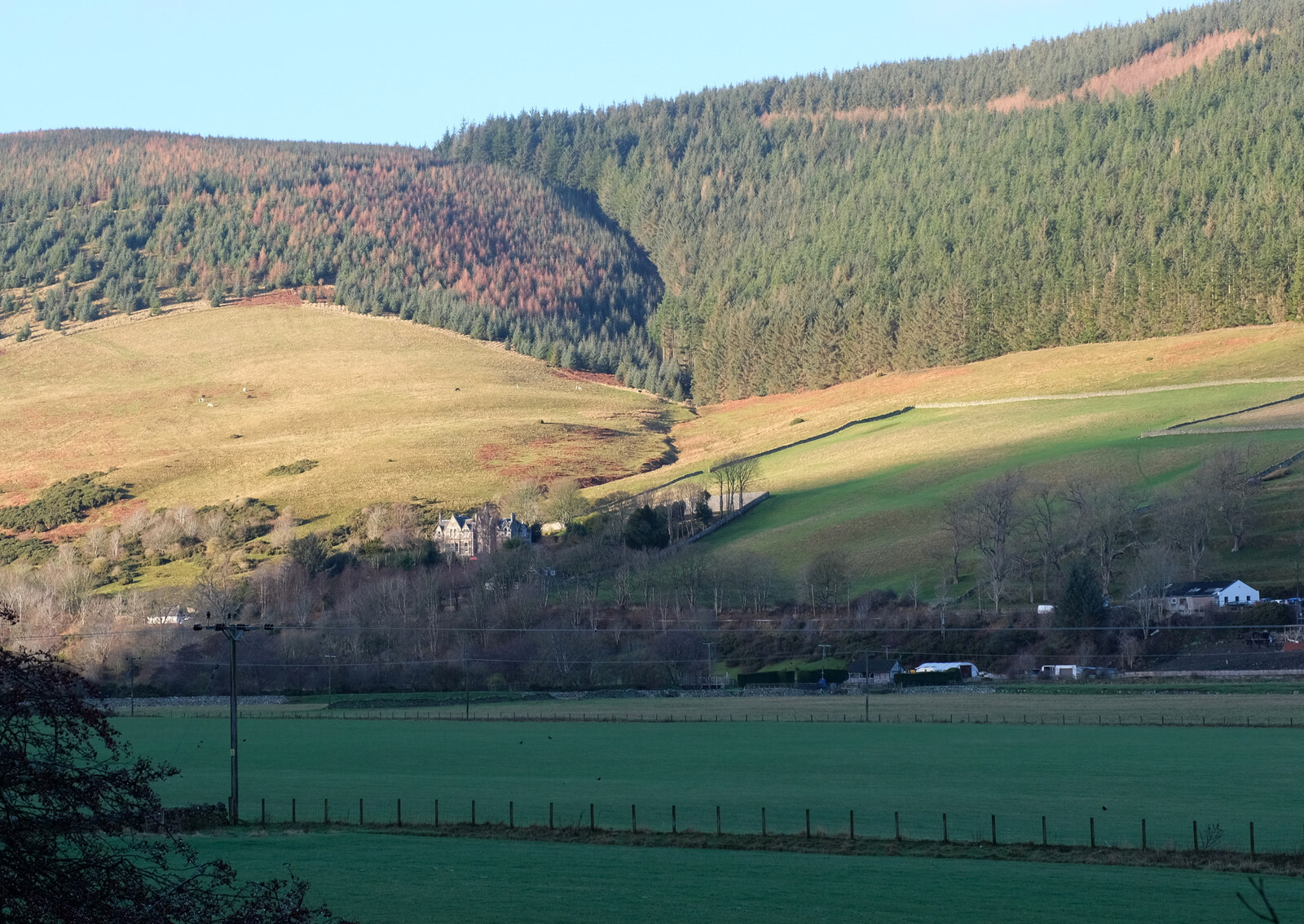
Viewed from across the Tweed Valley, The Kirna, 2025
