= Vandeput =

Vandeput is a surname. Notable people with the surname include:

- George Vandeput (died 1800), English Royal Navy admiral
- Steven Vandeput (born 1967), Belgian politician
- Virgile Vandeput (born 1994), Belgian-born alpine skier who competes for Israel

== See also ==
- Vandeput baronets, extinct English baronetcy
