= Alexander Murray of Elibank =

British Army officer and Jacobite agent

The Honourable Alexander Murray
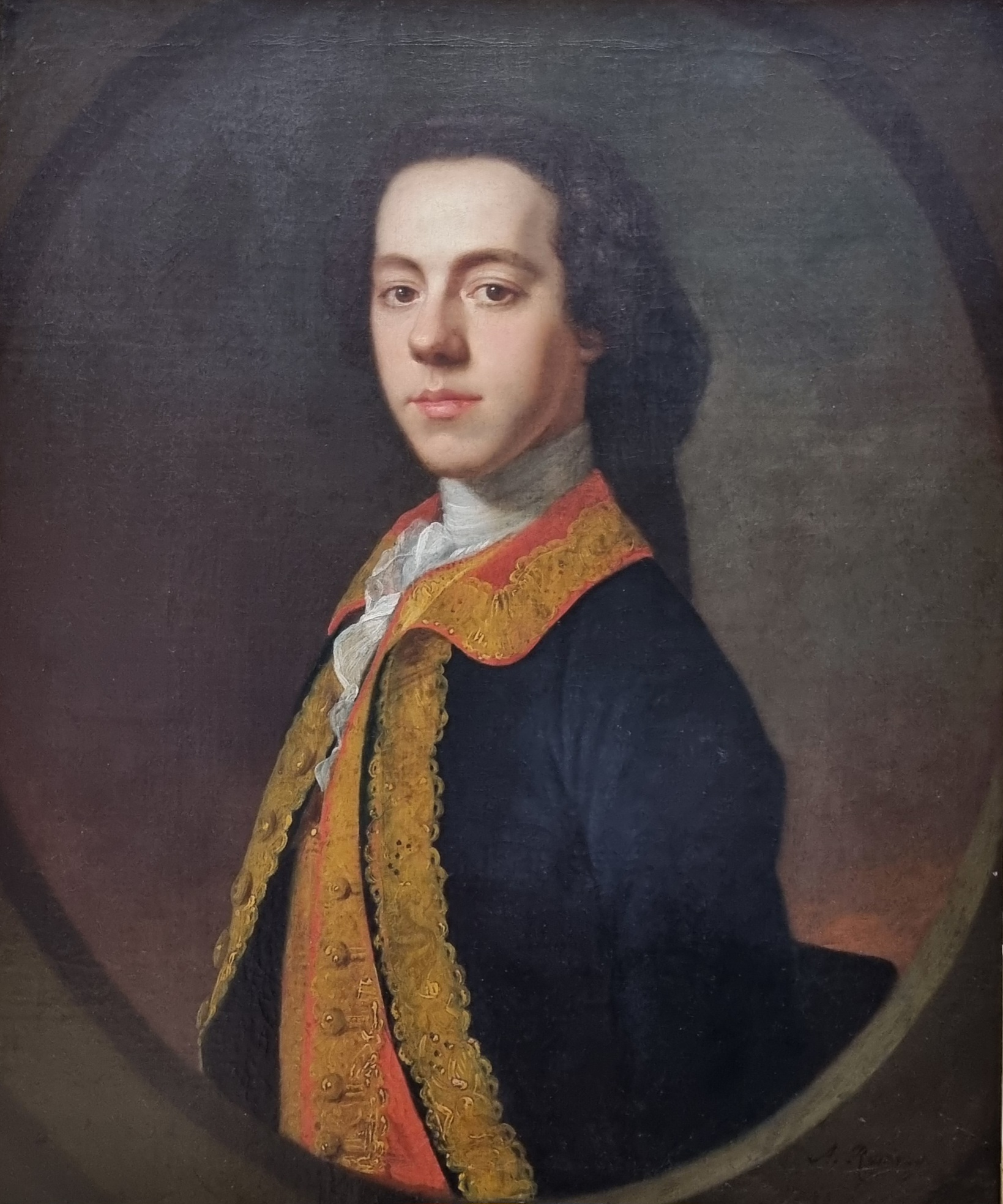
- Alexander Murray of Elibank by Allan Ramsay
- Born: 9 December 1712; Ballencrieff Castle, East Lothian, Scotland
- Died: 27 February 1778 (aged 65); Taplow, Buckinghamshire, England
- Known for: Elibank Plot
- Movement: Jacobitism

Alexander Leopold Murray of Elibank (9 December 1712 – 27 February 1778), generally called Count Murray after 1759, was a British Army officer and Jacobite agent. He gave his name to the Elibank Plot, a 1752 scheme to kidnap George II of Great Britain and restore the exiled House of Stuart.

Murray was a shrewd operative, and Horace Walpole said that he and his brother were "both such active Jacobites, that if the Pretender had succeeded, they could have produced many witnesses to testify their zeal for him; both so cautious, that no witnesses of actual treason could be produced by the government against them".

== Biography ==
Murray was born at Ballencrieff Castle, the fourth son of Alexander Murray, 4th Lord Elibank and Elizabeth (née Stirling), and a brother of Patrick Murray, 5th Lord Elibank and General James Murray. He took a commission as an ensign in the 26th (Cameronian) Regiment of Foot on 11 August 1737, eventually becoming a lieutenant. A marriage of convenience gave him an annual income of £3,000. This enabled him to lend to Charles Edward Stuart hundreds of pounds at high interest at a time when Charles was short of money. This also led him into Charles' inner circle. Despite his close association with the prince, he took no part in the Jacobite rising of 1745.

=== Westminster by-election ===
In late 1749, during a parliamentary by-election for Westminster, Murray vigorously supported the opposition candidate, Sir George Vandeput, 2nd Baronet, who was standing against the incumbent, Viscount Trentham. In January 1750, the high bailiff of Westminster claimed that Murray had encouraged mob violence during the by-election by shouting: "Will no one have courage enough to knock the dog down?". On 6 February Murray was summoned before the House of Commons, taken into custody by the Commons' authorities, and sent to Newgate Prison. When he was in the House of Commons and ordered to kneel down to receive his sentence, Murray refused, saying: "Sir, I beg to be excused; I never kneel but to God".

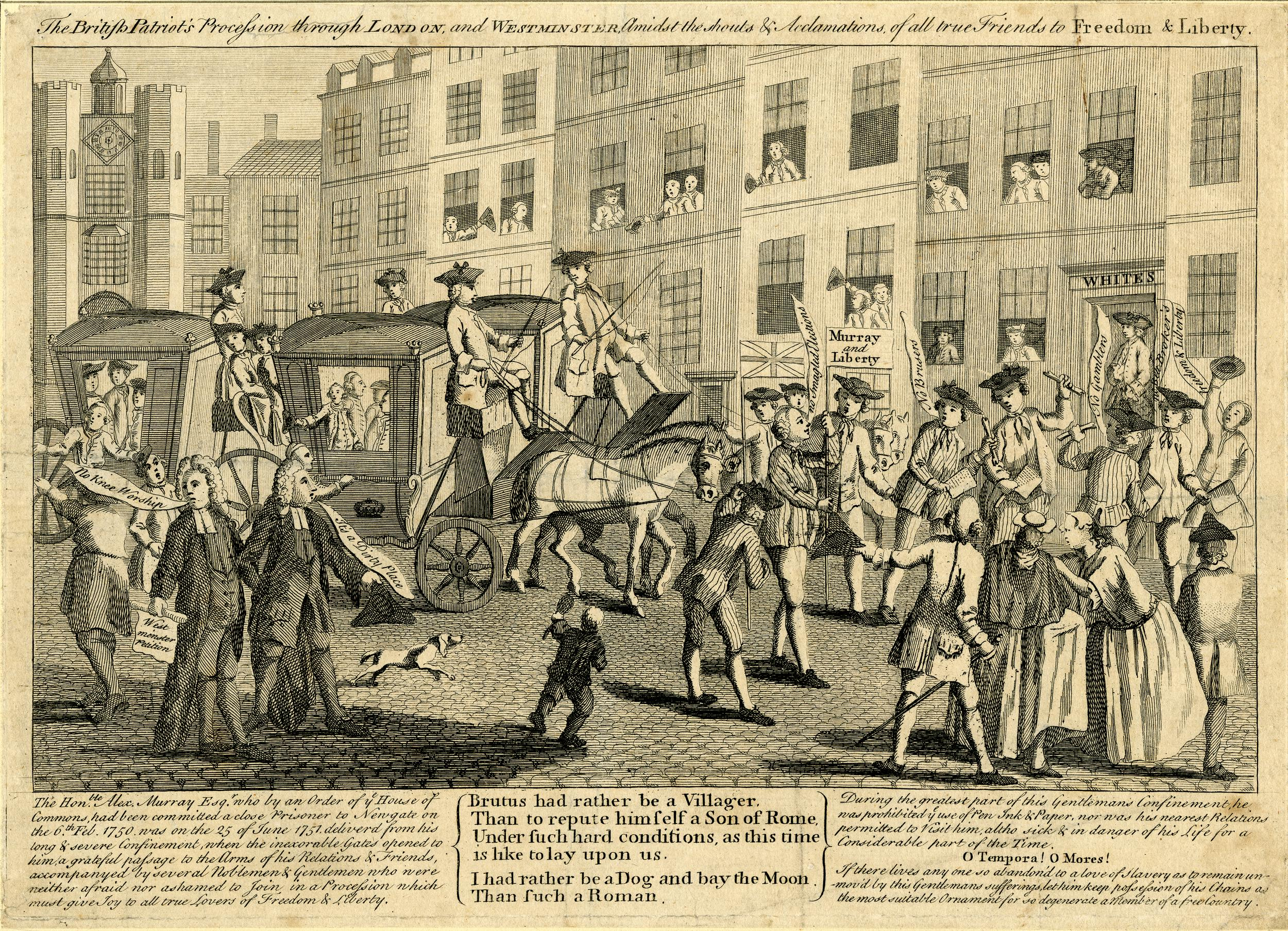
A depiction of the procession welcoming Murray's release from Newgate Prison in 1751

Murray was returned to Newgate for two months for contempt, and he was refused release when brought before the House again. Supported by the lawyer Sir John Philipps, 6th Baronet, he tried to obtain a writ of Habeas corpus from a court, which was rejected. According to a contemporary satirical print, Murray was prohibited use of pen, ink and paper, and was not allowed to be visited by friends or relations. Murray was eventually released on 25 June 1751, on the day that Parliament was prorogued. Upon release he was driven to his brother's house on Henrietta Street, Covent Garden in a carriage accompanied by Lord Carpenter, being cheered by a numerous crowd carrying a banner with the words "Murray and Liberty" inscribed. A pamphlet in celebration of Murray was subsequently circulated by Paul Whitehead, who was detained in custody. Murray fled to France to avoid arrest and in November 1751, the House of Commons passed a motion calling for Murray to return to prison and offering a reward of five hundred pounds for his apprehension.

=== Elibank Plot ===
In 1752 and 1753 Murray became involved in a Jacobite plot that came to bear his name. The plot was likely initiated by the secret visit of Prince Charles Edward Stuart to London in September 1750. In June of that year, Charles had instructed his agent in Antwerp to procure 26,000 muskets. While in London, Charles allegedly met the Duke of Beaufort, the Earl of Westmorland and other leading English Jacobites to discuss the restoration of the House of Stuart. It was likely during this meeting that Charles was dissuaded from initiating a popular rising in north Wales or the west of England.

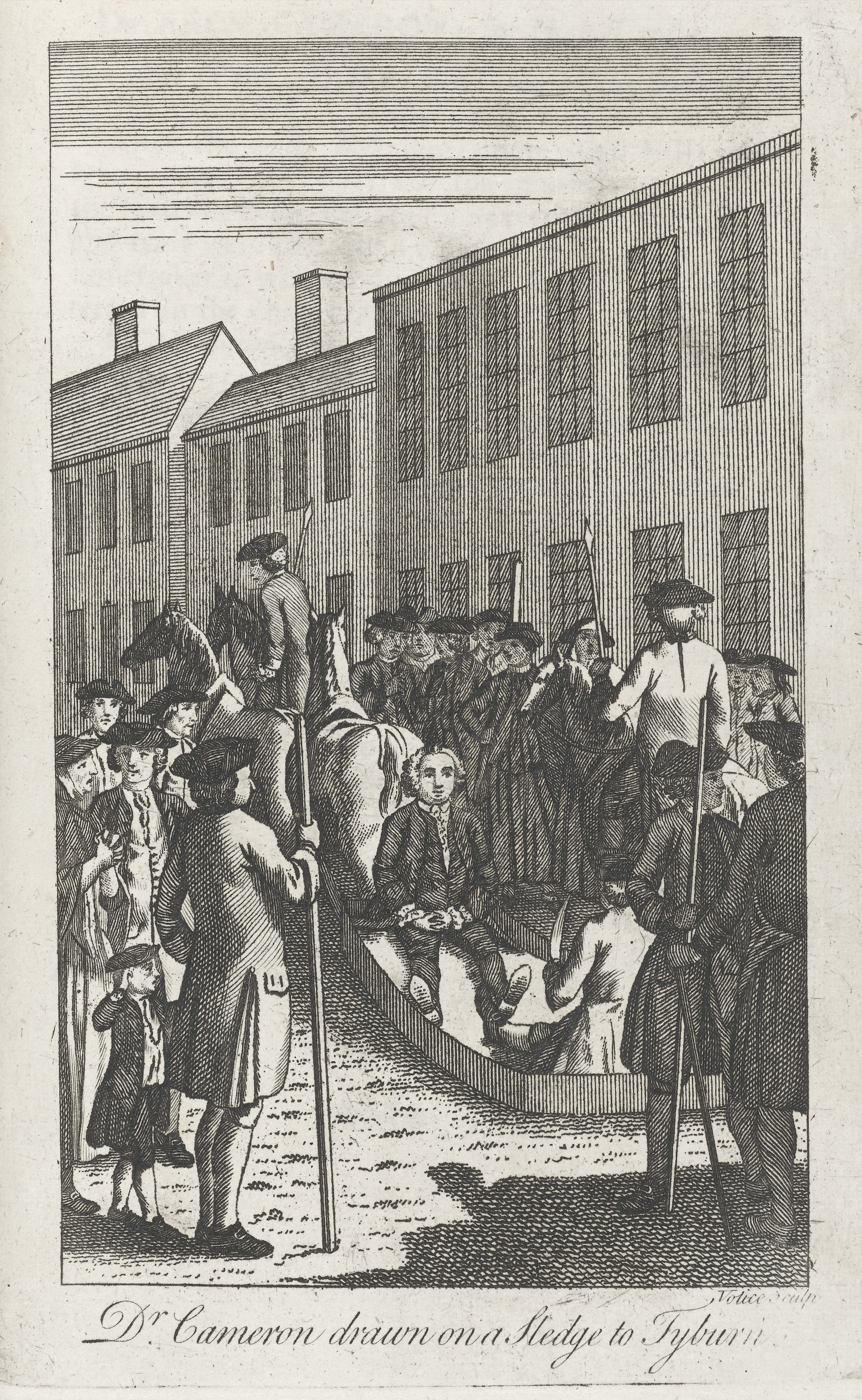
Anti-Jacobite broadside depicting Archibald Cameron of Lochiel being drawn on a sledge to Tyburn prior to his execution

It was not long after these events that Murray fled to France following the Westminster by-election fiasco and began to openly espouse the Jacobite cause. Sir Charles Petrie suggest that it is likely as this stage that Muray and Prince Charles began to develop a scheme together. Thomas Carte was employed to carry messages between France and Jacobite loyalists in Britain, and Frederick the Great was asked to give soldiers to support the plot.

The plan was to kidnap King George II and other members of the Royal Family on 10 November 1752 and place them on a boat in the Thames that would sail to France. Detailed analysis of the sentry system at St James's Palace was taken down and two or three thousand men were chosen to congregate at Westminster, though to avoid suspicion they would lodge at separate properties. On the night that the King would be abducted, they would assemble at pre-planned locations, with St James's being seized, the Tower of London's gates opened, the guards overwhelmed and the Royal Family smuggled to France. Murray had suggested that the Royal Family be murdered, perhaps by poison, but this option was flatly rejected by Charles. Simultaneous to events in London, James Francis Edward Keith was to land in Scotland with a Swedish army, to be met by Scottish Jacobites rallied by Archibald Cameron of Lochiel.

Murray visited England in November 1752 and assessed the preparations undertaken by George Heathcote, who had been tasked with ensuring the City of London joined any Jacobite rising. Anthony Langley Swymmer visited the Prince in France to discuss the scheme. Nonetheless, the plot was postponed, possible owing to Murray's courage failing him. Petrie does not find a definite reason for the postponement of the plot, but suggests that Charles realised he had placed too much reliance on Prussian support. The winter of 1752–3 saw further arrangements being made. However, on 20 March, Cameron of Lochiel was arrested after being betrayed by a co-conspirator, Alastair Ruadh MacDonnell, and on 8 June he was hanged for high treason. This was a serious blow for the Jacobite plotters. This event, combined with a lack of Prussian support, likely led to the abandonment of the Elibank plot. The plot foundered on its participants' pessimism and Murray announced a permanent postponement of the operation, travelling to Paris to inform Charles.

=== Later life ===
Murray remained in exile for the next twenty years. In 1759 James Francis Edward Stuart created him Earl, Viscount and Lord of Westminster in the Jacobite peerage, with the remainder to both his male heirs and the male heirs of his brothers. Thereafter he was generally known as Count Murray, especially in Jacobite circles. In April 1771 he was allowed to return to Britain by letter under the king's privy seal. He died unmarried at Taplow, Buckinghamshire in 1778.

== Depictions ==
His portrait, painted by Allan Ramsay in 1742, is in the collection of the Scottish National Portrait Gallery. This portrait was the basis for a later mezzotint print by John Faber the Younger, also now in the same collection.

== Notes ==
Peerage of England
New creation	— TITULAR — Earl of Westminster; Jacobite peerage 1759–1778	Succeeded by Patrick Murray
