= Black suffrage =

Black people's right to vote

Black suffrage refers to Black people's right to vote and has long been an issue in countries established under conditions of Black minorities as well as, in some cases (notoriously South Africa under apartheid and Rhodesia), Black majorities.

== United States ==
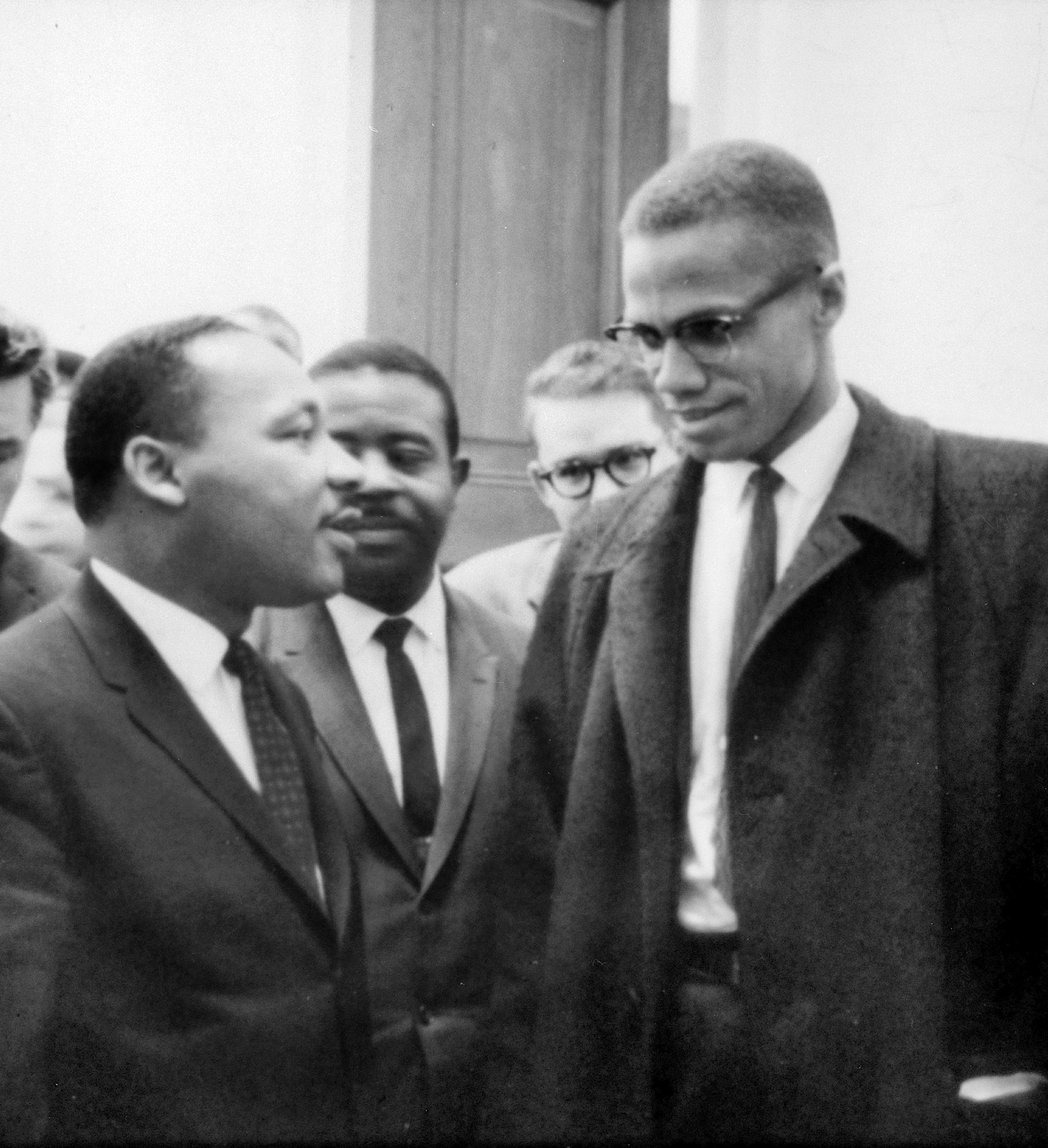
MLK and Malcolm X

Suffrage in the United States has had many advances and setbacks. Prior to the Civil War and the Reconstruction Amendments to the U.S. Constitution some free Black men in the United States were given the right to vote. However, this right was often abridged, or taken away. Following Emancipation, Black people were theoretically equal before the law, including theoretical suffrage for Black women from 1920. Black men were given voting rights in 1870, while Black women were effectively banned until the passage of the Voting Rights Act of 1965.

When the United States Constitution was ratified (1789), a small number of free Blacks were among the voting citizens (male property owners) in some states. Most Black men in the United States were, however, not able to exercise the right to vote until after the American Civil War with the Reconstruction Amendments. In 1870, the 15th Amendment was ratified to prohibit states from denying a male citizen the right to vote based on “race, color or previous condition of servitude." This was before former Confederate and slave states implemented "Jim Crow" regulations that denied the vote to many Blacks.

"Black suffrage" in the United States in the aftermath of the American Civil War explicitly referred to the voting rights of only Black men. Female suffrage, regardless of race, was only gradually introduced following the Civil War, beginning with Wyoming in 1869.

The passage of the 19th Amendment, which was ratified by the United States Congress on August 18 and certified as law on August 26, 1920 granted women the right to vote in all states. In fall 1920, many Black women showed up at the polls, but many existing hurdles for African Americans were particularly cumbersome in repressing . Only after the passage of the Twenty-fourth Amendment and the Voting Rights Act in 1964 and 1965 did the exercise of the vote become more or less equal for Black women.

== Australia ==
The Commonwealth Franchise Act 1902 restricted the right of Aboriginal Australians to vote in Australian federal elections. This Act was changed in 1962, when the Commonwealth Electoral Act was amended.

== British Empire and United Kingdom ==
- Beginning in 1265, a small number of landed aristocrats and gentry had the right to vote for members of the Parliament of England and Knights of the Shire. From 1432, only forty-shilling freeholders held the parliamentary franchise. Suffrage was restricted to males by custom rather than statute.
- Olaudah Equiano and the London Corresponding Society (founded 1792) argued for expanded suffrage. Also see: Radicalism (historical). The vote was restricted to adult males and also by property qualifications, but never by race. The first Black person known to have voted in a British election was John London in 1749.
- The Reform Act 1832 extended the vote to landed middle class men.
  - Incremental reform continued with various Reform Acts,
  - The Representation of the People Act 1918 ended property qualification for male suffrage.
  - The Equal Suffrage Act 1928 ended property qualifications for female suffrage.
- Citizens of Crown Colonies did not have the right to vote for the government of the British Empire.
  - Colonial Jamaica sometimes had partial privileges to elect leaders. The Constitution of Jamaica provided for partial voting rights.
  - The British monarchy appointed all leaders of Colonial Sierra Leone until 1953; the 1962 Sierra Leonean general election was the country's first election with universal suffrage.
  - The West Indies Federation (1958–1962) was slated to become autonomous but never did; a number of its member states have since achieved autonomy.
- Non-UK Commonwealth citizens residing in the UK have full voting rights as they are recognised as citizens. Prior to the British Nationality Act 1981 Commonwealth Citizens were officially called British Subjects and always counted as such in law. When the first British Nationality Act 1948 was passed it reconfirmed this right and also statutorily defined citizenship rights for British Protected Persons which before 1948 was granted solely by royal prerogative unlike for British Subject/Commonwealth Citizens.
- Republic of Ireland citizens, although not Commonwealth Citizens still enjoy full voting rights in the UK, occupying the unique position of Foreigners with British subject hood.

== South Africa ==
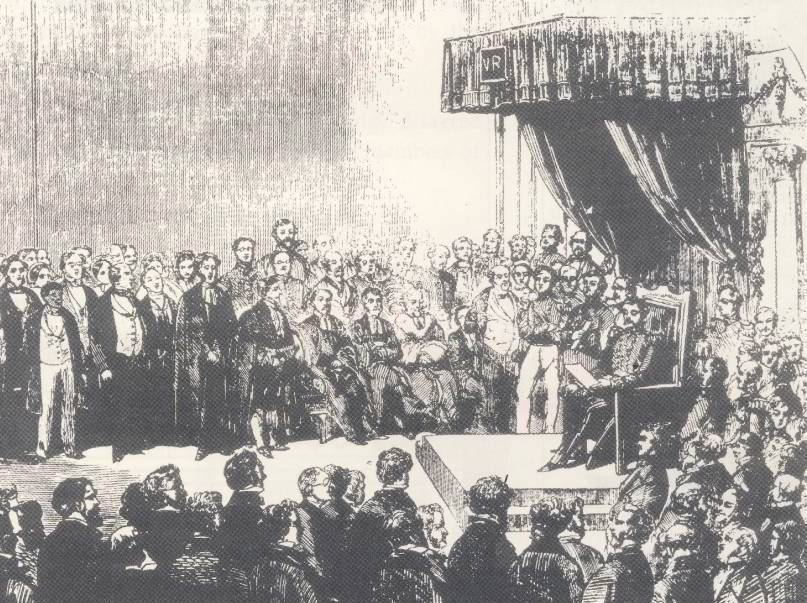
Engraving of the first opening of the Cape Parliament in 1854. The new constitution barred discrimination on the basis of race or colour and, in principle at least, the Parliament and other government institutions at the time were explicitly colour-blind.

=== Cape Colony ===
- The Cape Qualified Franchise restricted voting by property ownership but not explicitly by race.
  - In 1853, the Queen authorized a Cape Colony parliament, which drafted a Constitution with no explicit racial restriction.
  - Cape Colony's "Responsible Government" Constitution, issued in 1872, explicitly prohibited racial discrimination.
  - Under Prime Minister Gordon Sprigg, the Colony passed the 1877 "Registration Bill", disenfranchising Black communal land owners.
  - The Franchise and Ballot Act of 1892 raised the threshold for suffrage from £25 to £75, accomplishing de facto disenfranchisement of most non-White subjects, and also of poor whites (particularly Afrikaners).

=== South Africa ===
- The Representation of Natives Act, 1936 moved Black South Africans onto separate voter rolls
- Apartheid in South Africa refers to a period of heavily legislated white supremacy during which Black suffrage was heavily restricted.
  - The Coloured vote constitutional crisis in the 1950s originated with the Separate Representation of Voters Act, 1951, an attempt to revoke suffrage for Coloured voters. The Separate Representation of Voters Amendment Act, 1968 fully revoked Coloured representation in Parliament, creating the distinct Coloured Persons Representative Council.
  - The Promotion of Bantu Self-government Act, 1959 ended Black representation in Parliament through the creation of Bantustans; Black citizenship was transferred fully to Bantustans by the Bantu Homelands Citizenship Act, 1970
  - South Africa's 1983 Constitution, approved by the White-only constitutional reform referendum, created the Tricameral Parliament, giving representation in separate Chambers to Coloured and Indian voters. Coloured voters were represented in the House of Representatives of South Africa.
- The South African Constitution of 1993, also known as the Interim Constitution, provided for the 1994 South African general election: the first South African election with Universal suffrage for adults. The date—27 April—is celebrated as a national holiday called "Freedom Day".
- The current Constitution of South Africa, adopted in 1997, protects all citizens' right to vote in Chapter Two.

=== Namibia ===
- Germany took official control in 1884; it was known as German South West Africa. German sovereignty was contested by the Khaua-Mbandjeru Rebellion and the Herero Wars, which were brutally suppressed.
- South Africa gained control of the area during World War I. It eventually governed South-West Africa under apartheid laws and divided the area into ten bantustans.
  - Many residents recognized SWAPO, not South Africa, as the legitimate authority. The United Nations recognized SWAPO as Namibia's legitimate representative in 1972.
  - The 22-year Namibian War of Independence culminated in the New York Accords of 1988, leading to Namibia's first free election in November 1989.
- The Constitution of Namibia, adopted in 1990, provides in Article 28 for "direct, universal and equal suffrage".

== France ==
- Before the Revolution, only some local elections were held, the first real national suffrage appeared in 1791.
- From 1791, France installed several male suffrage systems, alternating between census and universal suffrage. In mainland France, there was no racial criterion to be a voter so technically from this date, Black (male) voters existed and received the same rights as non-Blacks. They were still rare as segregation in France was not based directly on skin color or racialism but on the status as a slave or as a free human. Later it would be based on status as a mainland citizen or as a colony citizen.
- From there, through the first half of the 19th century, frequent changes in the national government caused the colonies (where most slaves were, as their presence was restricted in mainland France) to have different rules than mainland France, often illegally. Several uprising occurred in the colonies during this period and the colonial rules diverged considerably from mainland France.
- In mainland France:
  - In 1794 the government abolished slavery.
  - In 1802 Napoleon Bonaparte re-established slavery and, possibly owing to his disagreements with Thomas-Alexandre Dumas, a black general, forbade Blacks and people of mixed-ancestry (mulâtres) to enter mainland France.
  - In 1815 slave trade was abolished, but not slavery
  - In 1848 slavery is formally abolished in France and all slaves are freed.
- In the French Colonial Empire, however, most indigenous people were not recognized as full French citizens and therefore often did not have the right to vote:
  - Vincent Ogé, who had been working in Paris during the Revolution, returned to the island slave colony of Saint-Domingue and demanded voting rights. Ogé led an insurrection in 1790 and was executed in 1791. Enslaved people took control of the island in the subsequent Revolution and established the Republic of Haiti. (Elections were held but the democracy was not stable.)
  - France promoted a model of assimilation according to which Blacks and indigenous people could gain voting (and other) rights by successfully conforming to French culture. These high-status Blacks were known as les Évoluées.
  - People living in French colonies primarily fell under the Code de l'indigénat. Les indigènes had some voting privileges, but these could be modified without their consent.
  - Following the Revolution of 1848, France granted limited representation to the Four Communes of Senegal. Ordinary residents of these cities gained full voting rights in 1916 after the election of Blaise Diagne.
  - Lamine Guèye (another Senegalese politician) also achieved expanded voting rights ("Loi Lamine Guèye") for people in the colonies.
  - Residents of African colonies were permitted to vote in the 1958 French constitutional referendum, which established the French Community. Most colonies voted for independence, resulting in the creation of 17 Black nations in the Year of Africa.

== Belgian Congo ==
- Black men and women in the Belgian Congo voted for the first time in municipal elections of 1957.
- The first nationwide election was the 1960 Belgian Congo general election.

== See also ==
- Decolonization of Africa
- Declaration on the Granting of Independence to Colonial Countries and Peoples
- Racial Equality Proposal, 1919
- Universal suffrage
- Women's suffrage
- Right of foreigners to vote
- Voting rights of Australian Aborigines
- Black nationalism
