= 1750 Westminster by-election =

Contentious by-election in Westminster in 1750

The 1750 Westminster by-election was a ministerial by-election to the Parliament of Great Britain for the Westminster constituency which took place between November 1749 and May 1750. The final result was declared on 15 May 1750, with the incumbent, Viscount Trentham, retaining his seat.

The by-election was notable for being highly contentious, even by the standards of 18th-century British elections. This materialised in the involvement of George II, Frederick, Prince of Wales and Jacobite agents, an intense Paper War between supporters of the candidates, mob violence, and the arrest of an election agent, Alexander Murray of Elibank. It was also the first British election in which a black person, John London, is recorded to have voted.

== Background ==
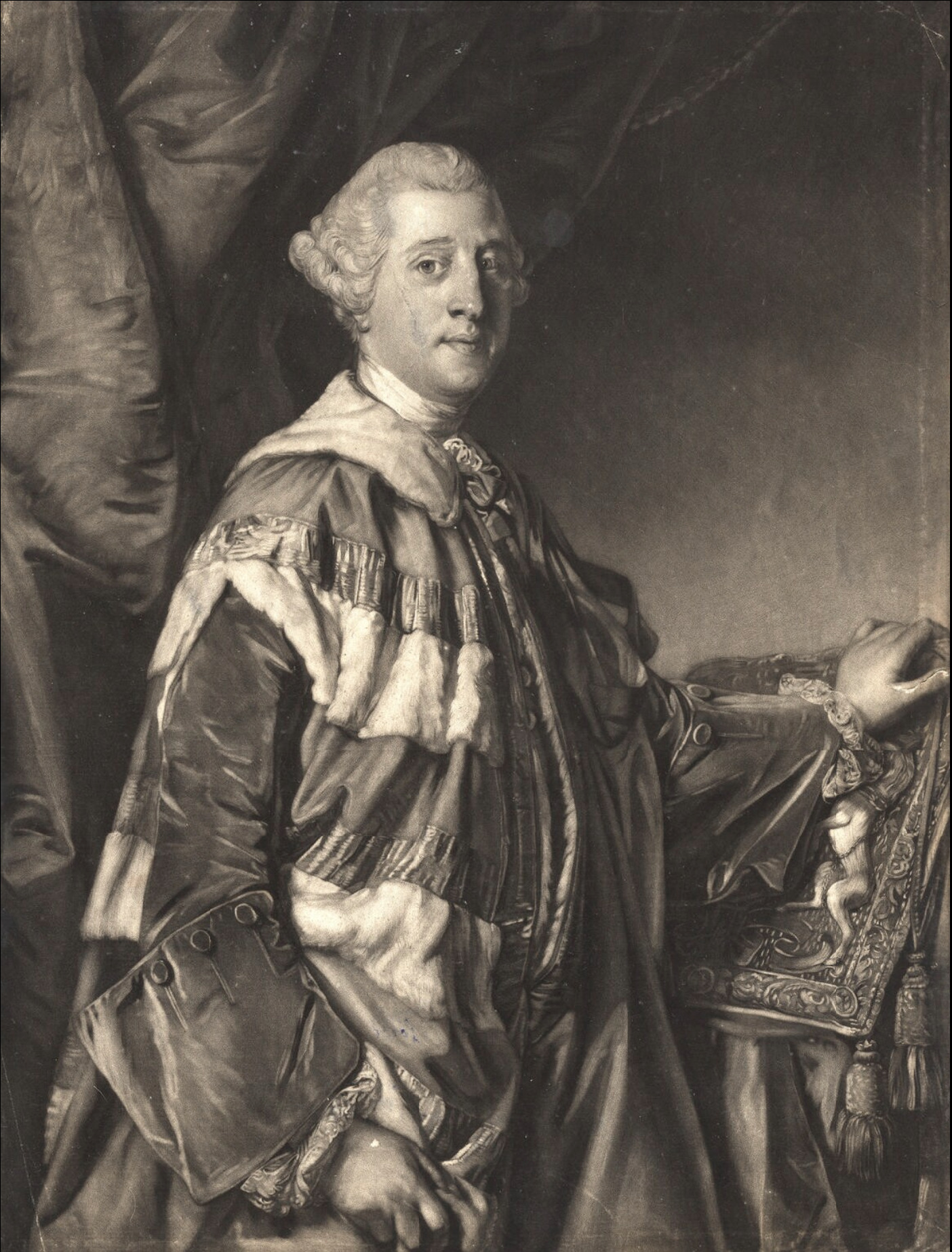
Viscount Trentham, whose appointment to the ministry in 1749 led to the by-election. Trentham was eventually declared to have retained the seat.

Viscount Trentham had been elected to represent the prestigious Westminster constituency at the 1747 British general election on the interest of the government, despite strong opposition from the local Jacobite dominated Association of Independent Electors. A by-election was called in November 1749 when, in accordance with parliamentary convention, Viscount Trentham was required to seek re-election to his seat following his appointment to the Broad Bottom ministry as a lord of the admiralty. The Whig statesman, the Duke of Bedford, who was Trentham's patron and controlled many properties in Westminster, expected the election to be won with little contest. Bedford accordingly directed his tenants to vote for Trentham. The franchise in the constituency, dictated by scot and lot, was the largest of any borough in the country. It numbered around 9,465 men in 1750, including many unskilled laborers.

Trentham's family had become unpopular among Tories owing to his father, Lord Gower's, desertion of the party during the 1740s. Trentham was also disliked by some in the Westminster constituency for his family's supposed support for a group of French actors in London amidst the suppression of English theatre under the Licensing Act 1737. As such, a November 1749 meeting of those supporting the independent (and anti-ministerial) interest decided to put forward a candidate to contest the election. George Cooke was initially proposed, but after he declined, the Tory Sir George Vandeput was chosen. The Lord Mayor of London, Samuel Pennant, promised £12,000 to cover Vandeput's election expenses.

== The campaign and election ==
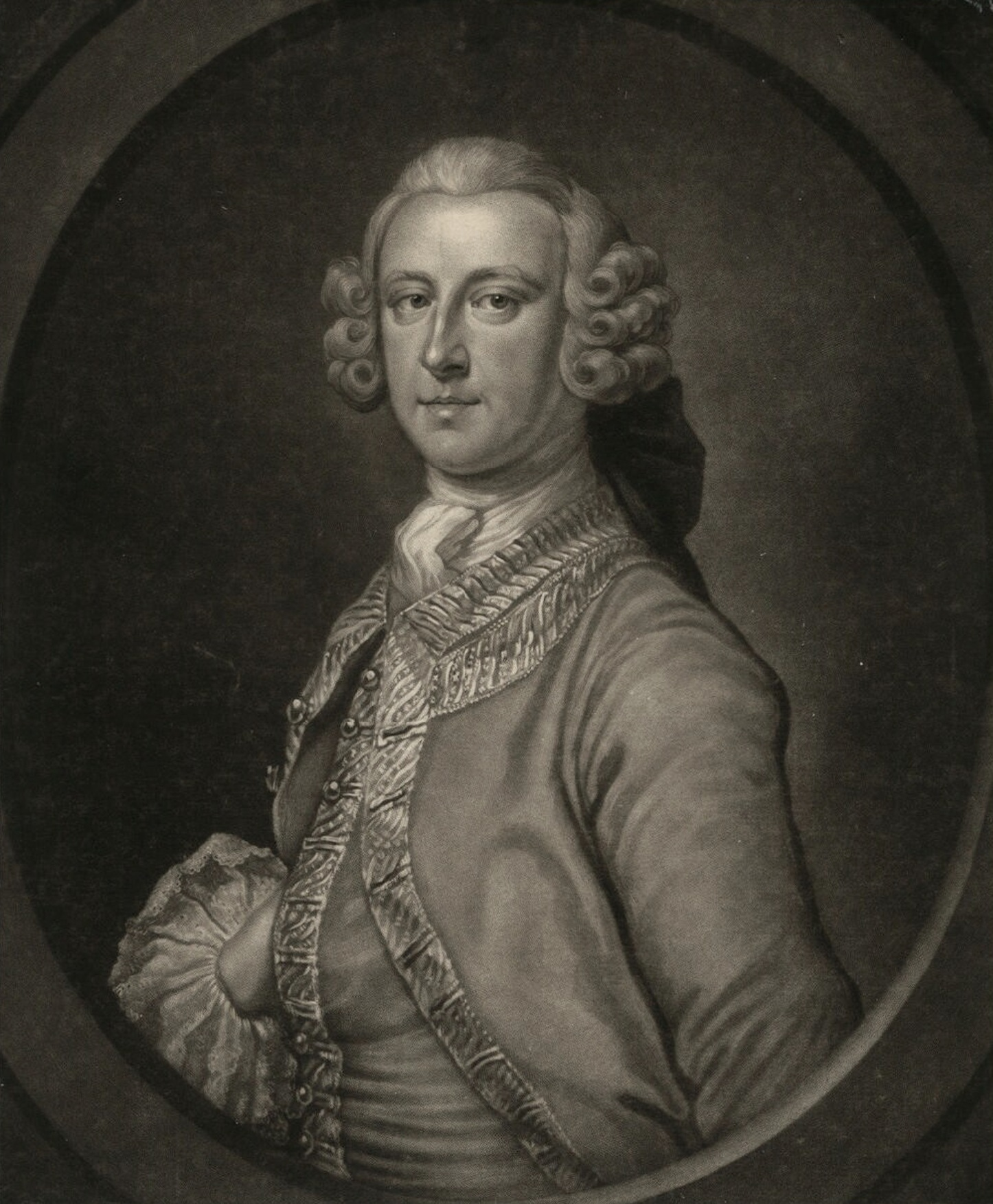
Sir George Vandeput, who contested and ultimately lost the by-election as the Tory candidate

Upon the selection of an opposition candidate, Bedford inflamed tensions by threatening tenants who voted for Vandeput with eviction or an increase in rent. The ministry led by Henry Pelham, indignant at having its authority contested in the seat containing the Palace of Westminster and explicitly encouraged by George II, also threw its weight behind Trentham's re-election. All the power of the court was employed to secure Trentham's re-election, including the extensive entertaining of voters at hostelries, artificially enlarging the electorate to include well-disposed voters, and intimidation. An extensive pamphlet campaign was launched by the end of 1749, charging Vandeput's supporters and independents with having been tacit supporters of the Jacobite rising of 1745 and of being "publicly drunk in their meetings and assemblies". Henry Fielding was among the satirists who gave their support to the ministry. Bedford paid for the publication of the hoax Covent-Garden Journal to mock Vandeput and his supporters, of which 13,000 copies were printed on 5–6 December.

Vandeput, meanwhile, received support from the Prince of Wales's faction, leading Tory MPs, and the Association of Independent Electors of Westminster. His campaign was fueled by popular resentment of the government following the execution of Bosavern Penlez and the unpopularity of the recently signed Treaty of Aix-la-Chapelle. The satirist Paul Whitehead was employed to compose advertisements and handbills in support of Vandeput. In the increasingly febrile atmosphere in Westminster, street battles ensued between the rival groups. The History of Parliament describes the by-election as having seen "scenes of unprecedented violence". On 6 February 1750 the suspected Jacobite Alexander Murray of Elibank, who had served as Vandeput's chief election agent, was brought before the House of Commons on charges of inciting the mob and seditious behaviour. On polling day itself, the Tories alleged that prisoners and debtors from Fleet Prison had been released to vote for Trentham, and that some electors had voted multiple times.

== Scrutiny and result ==
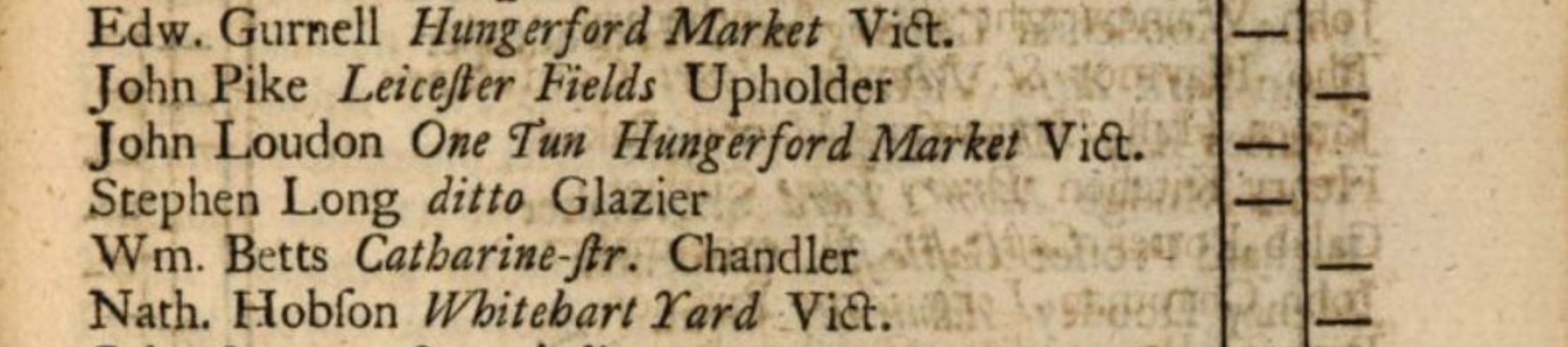
The name of John London, or "Loudon", recorded in A Copy of the Poll for a Citizen for the City and Liberty of Westminster (1749)

The high bailiff of Westminster, Peter Leigh, declared Trentham to have been elected with 4,811 votes to Vandeput's 4,654. Vandeput requested an ex post facto scrutiny of the ballot for disqualified voters, a process which continued throughout the spring of 1750. This was an expensive legalistic process, costing Vandeput over £20 per day, and the Prince of Wales donated at least an additional £300 to help pay for the scrutiny. Horace Walpole wrote that the election campaign cost the Duke of Bedford at least £7,000, and that scrutiny in favour of Trentham was being paid by Lord Gower and "will be at least as much". It was during the vote scrutiny that it was noted that John London was a "Blackamoor" who had voted for Trentham, thereby recording the earliest known vote by a black person in Great Britain.

On 15 May 1750, the high bailiff declared Trentham to have a revised majority of 170 following the scrutiny. Petitions were prepared by Lord Elibank, Alexander Murray and the Earl of Egmont in favour of Vandeput and accusing the high bailiff of failing to publish parish lists of eligible voters. One petition further charged Leigh with prolonging the scrutiny unnecessarily in order to extort "four guineas a day from each of the said candidates during the scrutiny, which lasted upwards of ninety days". The enquiry was frustrated by Trentham's supporters and the petitions were rejected; the high bailiff subsequently gave evidence against Alexander Murray to the Commons in January 1750.

By-Election 15 May 1750: Westminster
Party	Candidate	Votes	%	±%
Whig	Granville Leveson-Gower, Viscount Trentham	4,811	50.8	+8.5
Tory	George Vandeput	4,654	49.2	+49.2
Majority		157	1.6	N/A
Whig hold		Swing	N/A	

After the scrutiny the member returned was unchanged and vote totals were amended to Trentham 4,103; Vandeput 3,933.
