= The Bench (Hogarth) =

1758 painting by William Hogarth

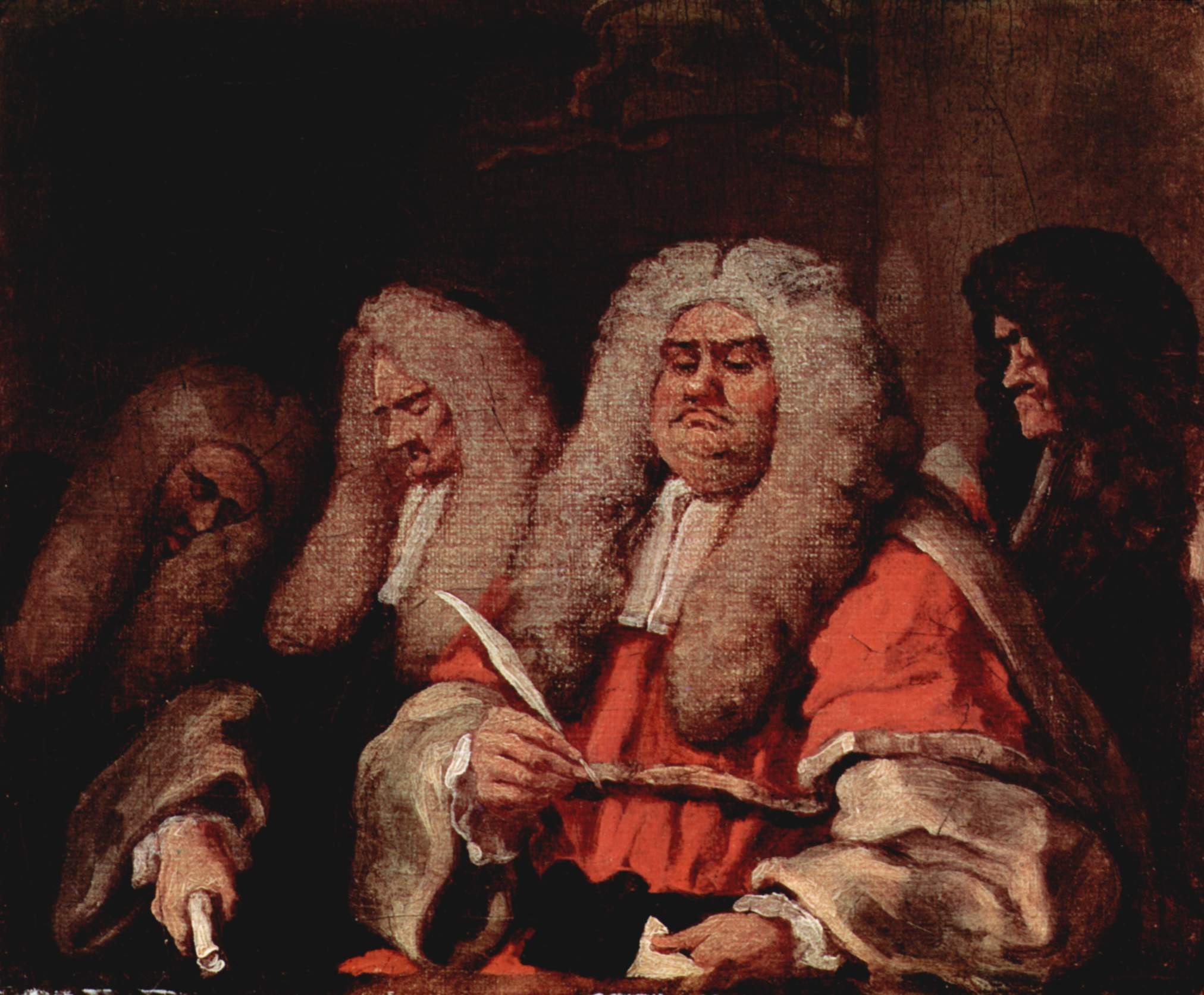
- Artist: William Hogarth
- Year: 1758
- Medium: Oil-on-canvas
- Dimensions: 14.5 cm × 18 cm (5 1/4 in × 7 in)
- Location: Fitzwilliam Museum, Cambridge

The Bench is the title of both a 1758 oil-on-canvas painting by the English artist William Hogarth, and a print issued by him in the same year. Unlike many of Hogarth's engravings produced from painted originals, the print differs considerably from the painting. It was intended as a demonstration of the differences between character painting, caricature and outré—developing on the theme he had begun to address in Characters and Caricaturas (his subscription ticket for Marriage à-la-mode)—but Hogarth was unhappy with the result as it showed only "characters", and he continued to work on the piece until his death.

== Background ==
Hogarth had often been accused of being a caricaturist, but regarded this as a slur on his work. In his book on art, The Analysis of Beauty, Hogarth claimed that the critics had branded all his women as harlots and all his men as caricatures. He complained:

…the whole nest of Phizmongers were upon my back every one of whome has his friends and were all taught to run em down.

He had made an early attempt to address what he perceived as a mistake on the part of his critics with the subscription ticket for his 1743 series Marriage à-la-mode, on which he contrasted a number of his reproductions of classical caricatures – from Annibale Carracci, Pier Leone Ghezzi and Leonardo da Vinci – with his version of some Raphael characters (from the Cartoons) and a hundred of his own character profiles. After Hogarth's death the subscription ticket was reproduced as print in its own right, minus the subscription details for Marriage a-la-mode, and came to be known as Characters and Caricaturas (from the inscription Hogarth had added at the foot of the original).

Hogarth intended to formally address the point with The Bench by creating a print for sale that showed characters, caricatures and outré. Hogarth dismissed outré as a subset of caricature, but considered caricature to be as far below the art of character painting as the "wild attempts of children". In his own comments on The Bench he compared character, caricature, and outré to comedy, tragedy, and farce in the theatre. Comedy, which he aligned with character, showed a true view of nature, as nothing was outside reality. Tragedy, which he compared to caricature, heightened reality, exaggerating aspects of its subjects. Farce and outré both took this heightening of features to ridiculous extremes. Hogarth scholar Ronald Paulson suggests that by the time he produced The Bench Hogarth had become very sensitive to the criticisms levelled at him as a painter, and was anxious both to distance himself once and for all from the caricaturists, and to prove both that he could capture the true nature of his subjects. Hogarth originally dedicated the print to the soldier and caricaturist George Townshend, but removed the dedication before the print was issued, fearing it would be misinterpreted; some variations on the first state of the print still show "Addressed to the Hon'ble Col. T—ns—d". Townshend was just the sort of talented amateur Hogarth despised: he used his talents as a caricaturist to attack his political opponents and gain an advantage for himself; by trying to differentiate character and caricature Hogarth hoped place himself in a class with the Renaissance painters and disassociate his work from that of the gentleman caricaturists for whom caricature was an enjoyable distraction or tool for their own advancement.

== Picture ==
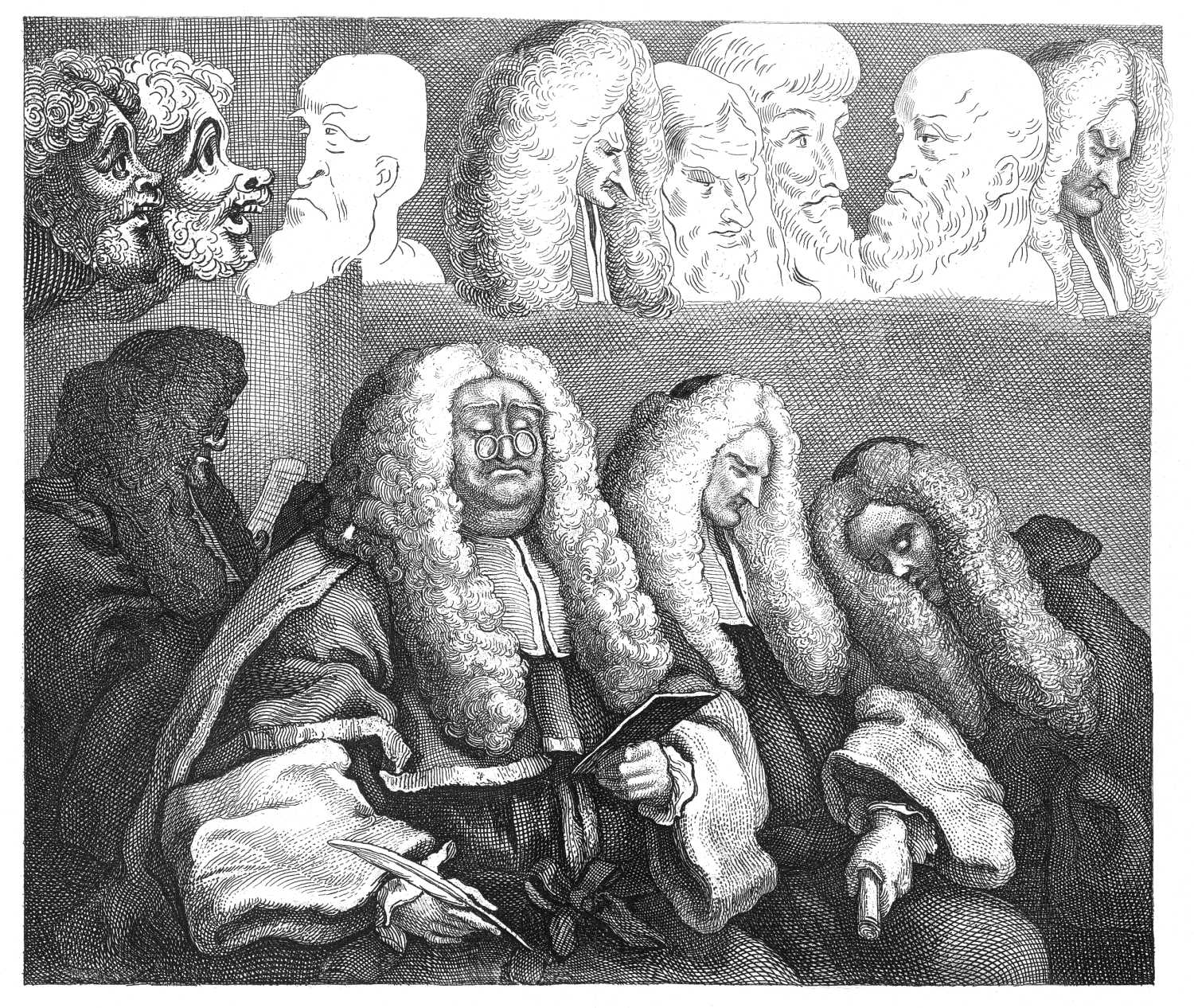
The second state, unfinished at the time of Hogarth's death.

The surviving painting and original (first state) print shows four judges sitting below the King's Arms, in session in the Court of Common Pleas. Hogarth ridicules the lack of ability or interest among the judiciary, whose "shallow discernment, natural disposition, or wilful inattention, is here perfectly described in their faces". None of the four judges is concerned with the case before them: one is busy other business; one is examining a former deposition or some material unconnected to the case before him; and the final two are lost on various stages of sleep. The four judges have been identified as the Honourable William Noel; Sir John Willes, the Chief Justice, the heavyset judge in the centre (with pince-nez in the engraving); Henry, later Earl Bathurst, and later still Lord Chancellor; and Sir Edward Clive, who is dozing on Bathurst's shoulder. Willes was known as a hanging judge – he had refused mercy for Bosavern Penlez in the cause célèbre of 1749, (Note: The Newgate Calendar's record of the case of Penlez states: It is said that the king was disposed to have pardoned them both; but that Lord Chief Justice Willes, before whom they were tried, declared in council that no regard would be paid to the laws except one of them was made an example of. Our account informs us that the king still inclined to pardon them both, and that the chief justice was three times sent for and consulted on this occasion; but that he still persisted in his former opinion. [It is a well-known fact that Lord Chief Justice Willes was a steady assertor of the dignity of the law. It could not be supposed that he could have any prejudice against the convict; and it must he concluded that his opinion arose from a regard to the public weal.) but was equally famed as a rake, and he is the main target for Hogarth's satire here. Hogarth's representation of Willes has been suggested as the inspiration for the character of Mr. Justice Harbottle in Sheridan Le Fanu's In a Glass Darkly (1872). The motto of the Order of the Garter "Honi soit qui mal y pense" below the King's Arms has been deliberately cut off in Hogarth's composition leaving only the evil thoughts of "Mal y pense" floating above the judges' heads. Paulson says that the painting's power derives from the juxtaposition of the frailty – both bodily and moral – of the judges themselves with the authority indued by the robes of state, and compares it to both Hogarth's second portrait of Bishop Benjamin Hoadly and his print of Strolling Actresses Dressing in a Barn, both of which contrast the human condition of the subjects with the grandeur of their dress. Hogarth designed and engraved the plates himself from his original painting. The first state print, which was issued on 4 September 1758, was intended to show the four judges as a demonstration of character portraiture. It is headed "Character" and subtitled "Of the different meanings of the words Character, Caricatura, and Outre, in Painting and Drawing".

Minor variations on the first state exist with different wording in the titles and inscription. The second state, the only known variation in the composition of the picture itself, is incomplete. The King's Arms have been removed and replaced by eight heads, in two subject groups, one showing character portrait and the other caricatures of the same figures. According to the addition made to the inscription plate by John Ireland, Hogarth started the alterations during October 1764, and was still working on them up to his death on 26 October 1764. Bathurst's appears again among these heads: his character portrait is reproduced to the far right in the character group, and a caricature appears in the same position in the caricature group. The other three figures in the two groups show two men looking eagerly at third, in poses reminiscent of the Cartoons of Raphael that Hogarth had used in Character and Caricatura.

=== Differences between the painting and the engraving ===
Most of Hogarth's engravings taken from his original paintings are fairly faithful reproductions within the limitations of the two media (where both survive to allow us to compare them). Occasionally a detail is clearer in the print from the engraving than in the painting, or a nuance is missing from the print, any colours from the painting are obviously lost in the black ink reproduction of the engraving, and the images are normally reversed, because the process of printing from the engraving naturally reverses the images from the plate. In The Bench there are a number of differences between the original painting and the prints. While the second state differs considerably because of the replacement of the King's Arms with the eight caricatured heads, the first state also has differences, chiefly in the composition of Justice Willes. He holds a quill in his right hand in both the painting and engraving, even though the composition is reversed. In the painting the quill is raised as if preparing to write, while in the print the hand holding the quill is more relaxed. In the painting he holds a small piece of paper in his left hand, in the engraving it has become a small book or sheaf of notes, the contents of which he appears to be studying. He has had a pair of pince-nez added in the engraving. Noel has also had a pair of glasses added. Willes' eyebrows, which had been black in the painting, are white in the engraving.

== Inscription ==
The print was accompanied by a second sheet of the same size with a lengthy inscription detailing Hogarth's motives for creating the piece. In a letter to Hogarth, a correspondent identified only as "B" noted that the print seemed of minor importance compared to the inscription, indeed it was the only written work that Hogarth released under his own name after the completion of The Analysis of Beauty; Paulson suggests it may have been a rejected passage from that book, and Trusler, a nineteenth-century commentator on Hogarth, goes as far as to wrongly attribute the inscription as an excerpt from chapter six.

Text of the inscription:

THERE are hardly any two things more essentially different than character and caricature, nevertheless they are usually confounded, and mistaken for each other, on which account this explanation is attempted.

It has ever been allowed that when a character is strongly marked in the living face, it may be consider as an index of the mind, to express which with any degree of justness in painting requires the utmost efforts of a great master. Now that which has of late years got the name of caricature is, or ought to be, totally divested of every stroke that hath a tendency to good drawing; it may be said to be a species of lines that are produced rather by the hand of chance than of skill; for the early scrawlings of a child, which do but barely hint an idea of a human face, will always be found to be like some person or other, and will often form such a comical resemblance, as, in all probability, the most eminent caricatures of these times will not be able to equal with design, because their ideas of objects are so much the more perfect than children's, that they will unavoidably introduce some kind of drawing: for all the humorous effects of the fashionable manner of caricaturing chiefly depend on the surprise we are under at rinding ourselves caught with any sort of similitude in objects absolutely remote in their kind. Let it be observed, the more remote in their nature, the greater is the excellence of these pieces. As a proof of this, I remember a famous caricature of a certain Italian singer, that struck at first sight, which consisted only of a straight perpendicular line with a dot over it. As to the French word outré, it is different from the foregoing, and signifies nothing more than the exaggerated outline of a figure, all the parts of which may be, in other respects, a perfect and true picture of human nature. A giant or a dwarf may be called a common man outré; so any part, as a nose, or leg, made bigger or less than it ought to be in the part outré, which is all that is to be understood by this word, injudiciously used to the prejudice of character.

== History ==
The original painting was bought by George Hay, a prominent civil servant in the Pitt Government, who owned several of Hogarth's works and whose portrait Hogarth had painted in 1757, then passed to a Mr. Edwards, and is now held by the Fitzwilliam Museum in Cambridge. The first and second states along with the inscriptions which accompanied both sold in Baker's 1825 auction of Hogarth's works for £6. 12s. 6d. The picture has some interest to scholars of Hogarth because of its continuation of the theme started in Characters and Caricaturas, and because the second state was unfinished at the time of Hogarth's death, but the picture is usually dismissed as little more than a jab at the legal profession in the mould of others of Hogarth's satirical prints which mocked various of the professions, such as Scholars at a Lecture and The Company of Undertakers.

== See also ==
- List of works by William Hogarth

== Sources ==
- Clerk, Thomas (1812). The Works of William Hogarth. Vol. 2. London: Scholey. p. 154.
- Fitzpatrick, Martin (2004). The Enlightenment World. Routledge. p. 800. ISBN 0415215757.
- Hogarth, William (1753). The Analysis of Beauty.
- Hogarth, William (1833). "Remarks on various prints". Anecdotes of William Hogarth, Written by Himself: With Essays on His Life and Genius, and Criticisms on his Work. J.B. Nichols and Son. p. 416.
- Lynch, Deidre (1998). The Economy of Character: Novels, Market Culture and the Business of Inner Meaning. University of Chicago Press. p. 332. ISBN 0226498204.
- Paulson, Ronald (1992). Hogarth: High Art and Low, 1732–50 Vol 2. Lutterworth Press. p. 508. ISBN 0718828550.
- Paulson, Ronald (1993). Hogarth: Art and Politics, 1750–64 Vol 3. Lutterworth Press. p. 596. ISBN 0718828755.
- Trusler, John (1833). The Works of William Hogarth. London: Jones and Co. p. 119.
