= Paul Whitehead (satirist) =

British satirist

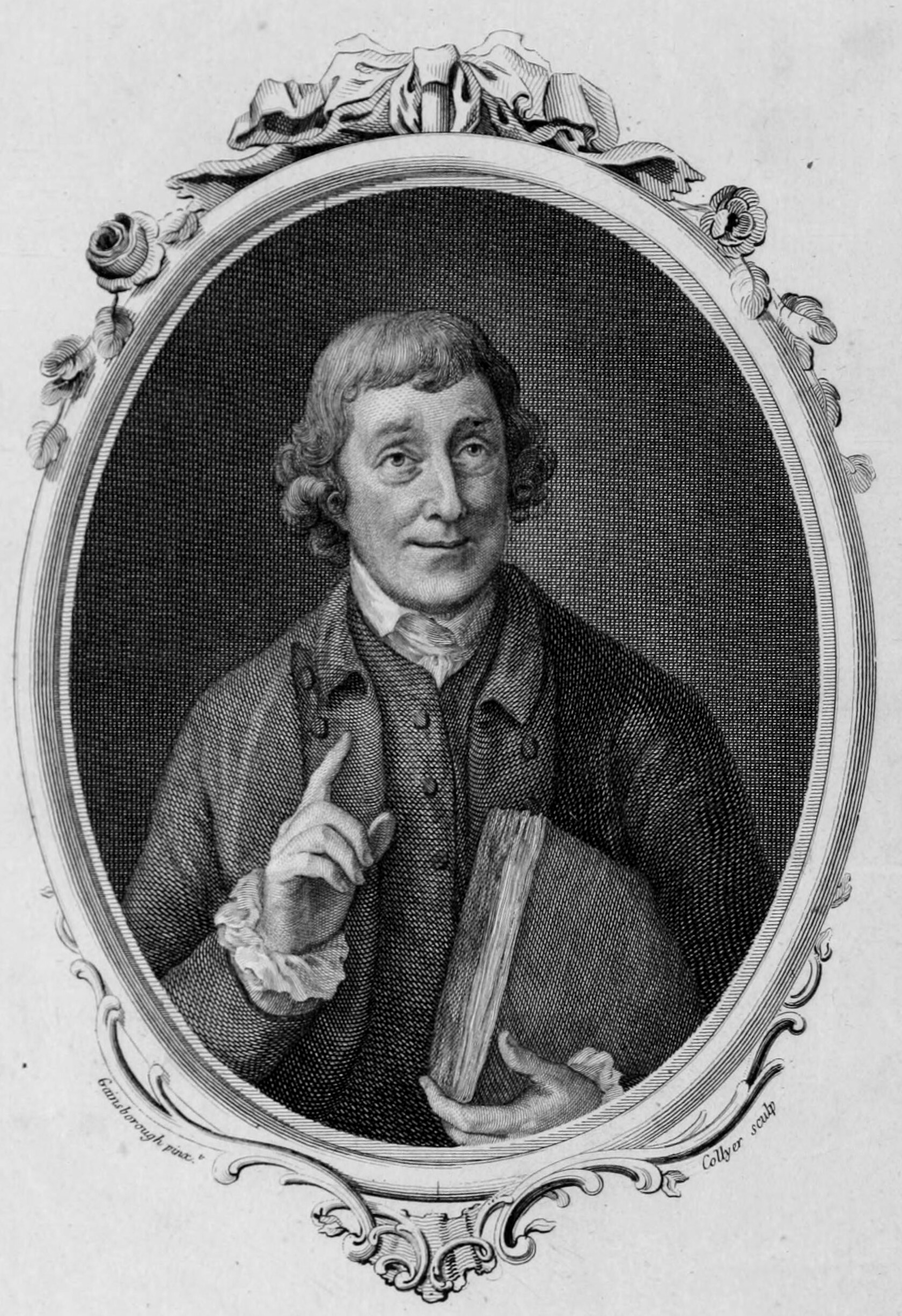
- Whitehead - frontispiece of The Poems and Miscellaneous Compositions
- Born: 6 February 1710; London, England, Great Britain
- Died: 20 December 1774 (aged 64); London, England, Great Britain

Paul Whitehead (6 February 1710 – 20 December 1774) was a British satirist and a secretary to the infamous Hellfire Club.

== Biography ==
He was born on 6 February 1710 in Castle Yard, Holborn in London where his father was a prosperous tailor. He may have attended a school at Hitchin; he was apprenticed to a mercer in the city but, showing little disposition for business, he may have taken chambers in the Temple as a law student.

However, he spent a number of years in Fleet Prison for backing a bill which Charles Fleetwood (theatre manager) failed to pay.

While in prison, Whitehead is said to have made his first literary efforts in the shape of political squibs. His first more elaborate production, "State Dunces", a satire in heroic couplets, was published in 1733. It was inscribed to Pope, the first of whose 'Imitations of Horace' dates from the same year, and whose Dunciad had appeared in 1728. Pope's rhythm, together with certain other characteristics of his satirical verse, is perhaps as successfully reproduced by Whitehead as by any contemporary writer; but he is altogether lacking in concentration and in anything like seriousness of purpose. The chief "State Dunce" is Walpole (Appius); others are Francis Hare, bishop of Chichester, and the Whig historian James Ralph.

The poem, which provoked an answer under the title of A Friendly Epistle, was sold to Robert Dodsley for £10.

In 1735, Whitehead married Anna, only daughter of Sir Swinnerton Dyer, bart., of Spains Hall, Essex, by which time either he had managed to leave the Fleet, or his marriage provided him with the means to do so. In 1739 he published "Manners", the satirical poem so highly thought of by Boswell, but considered by Johnson a "poor performance". The manuscript is preserved in the British Library (Add MS 25277, ff. 117–20). It cannot be said to exhibit any advance upon its predecessor, nor can its clamorous vituperation -

Shall Pope alone the plenteous harvest have,
And I not glean one straggling fool or knave?

- be held to be dignified by its pretence of proceeding from a patriot whose hopes are centred in Frederick, Prince of Wales. The personalities in this satire led to the author being summoned, with his publisher, before the bar of the House of Lords; but Whitehead absconded.

Whether or not the action of the Lords had been intended as a warning to Pope, whose two "Dialogues", 1738 (Epilogue to the Satires), had done their utmost to make the existing political tension unbearable, it at least sufficed to muzzle Whitehead for the moment. He continued, however, to make himself generally useful to the opposition. Thus in 1741 Horace Walpole mentions him as ordering a supper for eight patriots who had tried in vain to beat up a mob on the occasion of Admiral Vernon's birthday.

His next publication, "The Gymnasiad" (1744), is a harmless mock heroic in three short books or cantos, with "Prolegomena" by Scriblerus Tertius, and "Notes Variorum", in ridicule of the pugilistic fancy of the day, and dedicated to John Broughton, one of the most celebrated Sons of Hockley and fierce Brickstreet breed. In 1747 he published his last would-be political satire, Honour, in which Liberty is introduced as prepared to follow Virtue in quitting these shores, unless specially detained by "Stanhope" (Chesterfield). About the same time he is stated to have edited the Apology for the Conduct of Mrs. Teresia Constantia Phillips first published in 3 vols. in 1748.

Whitehead had now become a paid hanger-on of the Prince's Friends, and in the Westminster by-election of 1749 was engaged to compose advertisements, handbills, and the like for their candidate, Sir George Vandeput. When Alexander Murray, a supporter of the opposition candidate, was sent to Newgate Prison and detained there for a considerable period on the charge of having headed a riot, Whitehead composed a pamphlet on his case, which appealed to the indignation of the people of Great Britain as well as of the electors of Westminster.

In 1751 the prince died, and in 1755 Whitehead published his Epistle to Dr. Thompson, a physician of dissolute habits, who had quarrelled with the treatment adopted by the prince's physicians in his last illness, and whom Whitehead, from whatever motive, strives to justify by indiscriminate abuse of the "college". A pamphlet published by him in defence of Admiral Byng (1757) is said by Hawkins to be written in a defiant strain, as if an acquittal were certain.

During this period or immediately afterwards Whitehead was to suffer the deepest degradation of his life. His political intimacy with Sir Francis Dashwood, 11th Baron le Despencer and other politicians, and his literary talents, made him an acceptable member of the dissipated circle calling themselves the "monks of Medmenham Abbey", and he was appointed secretary and steward of the Hellfire Club. This made him an easy target of the scalp-hunting satirist Charles Churchill, who found in him a ready victim. In three of Churchill's satires he was branded as a "disgrace on manhood" (The Conference, 1763), as "the aged Paul" who chalks the score of the blasphemous revellers behind the door (The Candidate, 1764), and as the type of the "kept bard" (Independence, 1764). The times were not squeamish, and Churchill's testimony was not respected; but the charges were unanswerable, and Whitehead is now remembered for little else.

Whitehead had, however, at the time, been rewarded for his services by being appointed, through Sir Francis Dashwood, probably during his chancellorship of the exchequer in Lord Bute's ministry (1762–3), to a Deputy Treasurership of the Chamber, as one of his biographers calls it, worth £800 a year. This enabled him to enlarge the cottage on Twickenham Common where he had for some years resided. In his Epistle to Dr. Thompson he describes, quite in Pope's Horatian vein, the modest comforts of his retirement, and he appears to have been popular both in the country, where he was known for his kindliness, and in London society, where among his friends were Hogarth and Hayman, and the actor and dramatist William Havard. Sir John Hawkins, however, says that "in his conversation there was little to praise; it was desultory, vociferous, and profane. He had contracted a habit of swearing in his younger years, which he retained to his latest".

Whitehead published very little in his later years—a pamphlet on Covent Garden stage disputes is mentioned in 1768—but he wrote a few songs for his friend the actor Beard and others. On 20 December 1774 he died in his lodgings in Henrietta Street, Covent Garden, having during the course of a protracted illness burnt all his manuscripts within his reach. In his will he left his heart to his patron, Lord Le Despenser, by whose orders it was buried in the mausoleum at High Wycombe in Buckinghamshire, amid solemnities which under the circumstances might, like the bequest itself, have been omitted. He was buried at St Mary's Church, Teddington together with his wife Anne (d 1768).

A collection of his Poems and Miscellaneous Compositions, with a life by Captain Edward Thompson, which is dedicated to Lord Le Despenser, and written in a strain of turgid and senseless flattery, appeared at London in 1777 (4to).
