= Patrick Murray, 5th Lord Elibank =

British Army officer, lawyer and economist (1703–1778)

The Right Honourable The Lord Elibank
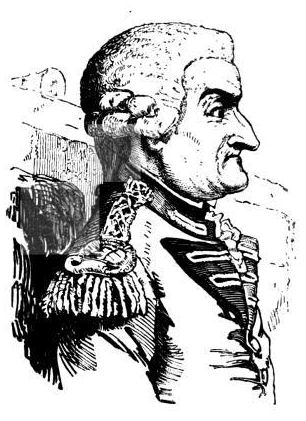
- Born: 1703
- Died: 3 August 1778 (aged 74–75); Ballencrieff Castle, Ballencrieff, Scotland

Lieutenant-Colonel Patrick Murray, 5th Lord Elibank (1703 – 3 August 1778) was a British Army officer, lawyer and economist.

== Life ==
He was the son of Alexander Murray, 4th Lord Elibank (1677–1736), and his wife Elizabeth (née Stirling; died 1756), daughter of George Stirling of Keir, and an eminent surgeon in Edinburgh. General James Murray (1721–1794) was his younger brother; as was Alexander Murray, who gained some notoriety as a Jacobite, not least during the 1750 by-election in Westminster. He was the uncle of Major Patrick Ferguson, killed at the Battle of King's Mountain in 1780.

Although admitted a member of the Faculty of Advocates in 1722, he soon turned from legal to military pursuits, becoming an ensign in the army, and subsequently major in Ponsonby's foot and lieutenant-colonel in John Wynyard's Regiment of Marines. With the latter regiment he served at the Battle of Cartagena de Indias in 1740.

After the failure of that expedition, Murray quit the army. He had married in 1735, and had succeeded his father as Lord Elibank the next year. Returning to Scotland, he associated chiefly with the members of the legal profession, among whom he had been brought up, and seems to have been very popular; but his chief interests were literary. He was long in intimate relations with Lord Kames and David Hume, and the three were regarded in Edinburgh as a committee of taste in literary matters, from whose judgment there was no appeal. He was the early patron of Dr. Robertson, and of John Home, the tragic poet, both of whom were at one time ministers of country parishes near his seat in East Lothian.

Upon the accession of George III, Elibank, like many other Jacobites, rallied to the house of Hanover; and when Lord Bute came into power it was determined to bring him into the House of Lords. This plan was, however, foiled by a severely sarcastic article by John Wilkes in the North Briton on his presumed services to the Pretender. Wilkes had been an unsuccessful candidate for the governorship of Canada when that office was conferred on Elibank's brother, General James Murray. He was a patentee of twenty thousand acres in West Florida

When in Scotland in 1773, Dr. Johnson paid Elibank a visit at his house of Ballencrieff Castle, Haddingtonshire. He was a member of the Cocoa Tree Club and The Poker Club.

His Edinburgh address in his final years is given as James Court on the Lawnmarket.

Elibank died at Ballencrieff on 3 August 1778.

== Family ==
He was married in 1735 to Maria Margaretta, daughter of Cornelis de Jonge van Ellemeet, receiver-general of the United Provinces, and widow of William North, 6th Baron North; but there was no issue of the marriage. Lady Elibank's jointure-house was Kirtling Park, Cambridgeshire, the ancient seat of the North family, now pulled down, and there she and Elibank often resided. She died in 1762.

== Works ==
Elibank's works were:

- Thoughts on Money Circulation and Paper Currency, Edinburgh, 1758.
- Queries relating to the proposed Plan of altering the Entails in Scotland, Edinburgh, 1765.
- Letter to Lord Hailes on his Remarks on the History of Scotland, Edinburgh, 1773.
- Considerations on the present State of the Peerage of Scotland, Edinburgh, 1774, in which he attacked with much warmth the mode of electing Scottish peers to the House of Lords.

Peerage of Scotland
Preceded by Alexander Murray	Lord Elibank; 1736–1778	Succeeded by George Murray
