= Eversfield baronets =

Extinct baronetcy

Escutcheon of the Fermor baronets of Welches and Sevenoak

The Fermor, later Eversfield baronetcy, of Welches in the County of Suffolk and of Sevenoak in the County of Kent, was a title in the Baronetage of Great Britain. It was created with special remainder on 4 May 1725 for Henry Fermor, a landowner of Castwisell House, Biddenden, son of the barrister William Fermor. He died childless in 1734. He left funds to endow a local school in Crowborough that now bears his name.

== Background ==
Henry Fermor was twice married, the second marriage being to Mary Thomas, sister of Sir William Thomas, 1st Baronet, as her fourth husband. Her first marriage was to John Eversfield of Horsham, who died in 1668.

The title passed under the special remainder to Charles Eversfield, of Denne Park, near Horsham, West Sussex, son of Charles Eversfield, Member of Parliament for Horsham. It became extinct on his death in 1784. He was related to John Eversfield of Horsham.

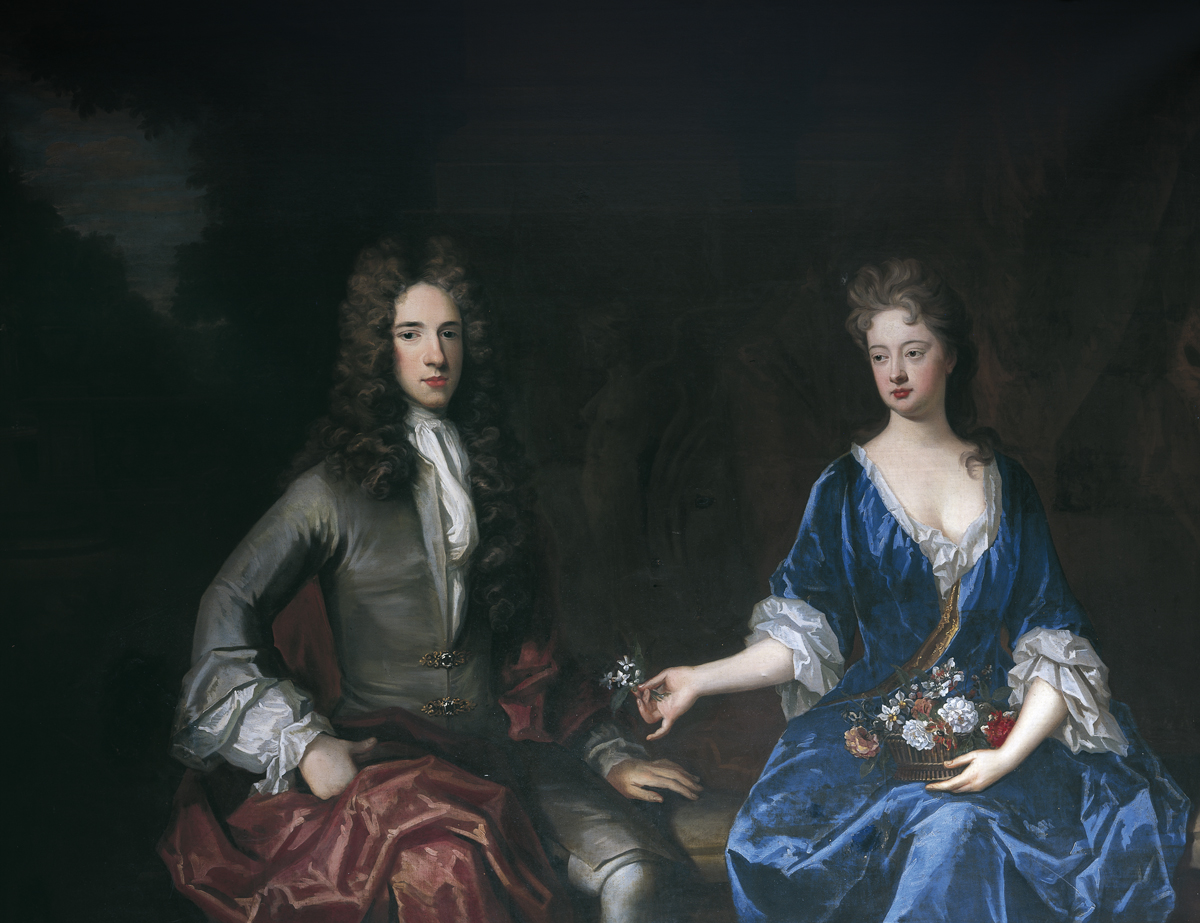
Portrait of Charles Eversfield and his wife, attributed to a follower of Godfrey Kneller. Horsham Museum, Horsham, West Sussex

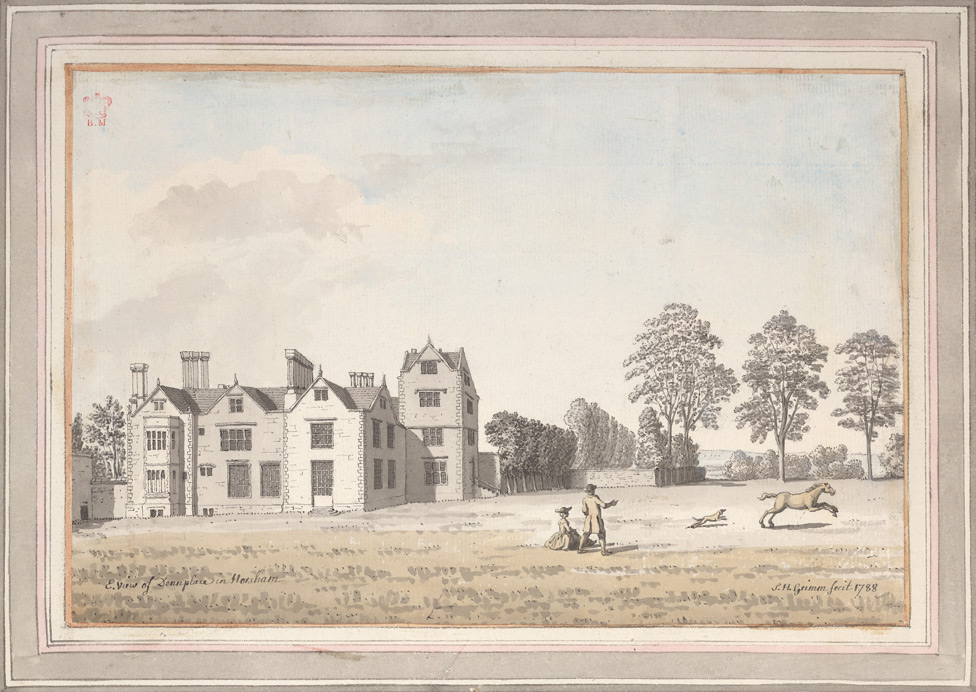
Denne Park, near Horsham in West Sussex, seat of the Eversfield baronets. Watercolour by Samuel Hieronymus Grimm

== Fermor, later Eversfield baronets, of Welches and Sevenoak (1725) ==
- Sir Henry Fermor, 1st Baronet (died 1734)
- Sir Charles Eversfield, 2nd Baronet (c. 1708–1784)

Baronetage of Great Britain
Preceded by Mitchell baronets	Fermor baronets of Welches and Sevenoak; 4 May 1725	Succeeded by Farnaby baronets
