= Alastair Ruadh MacDonnell =

Scottish spy

Alastair Roy MacDonell
- 13th Chief, Clan MacDonell of Glengarry
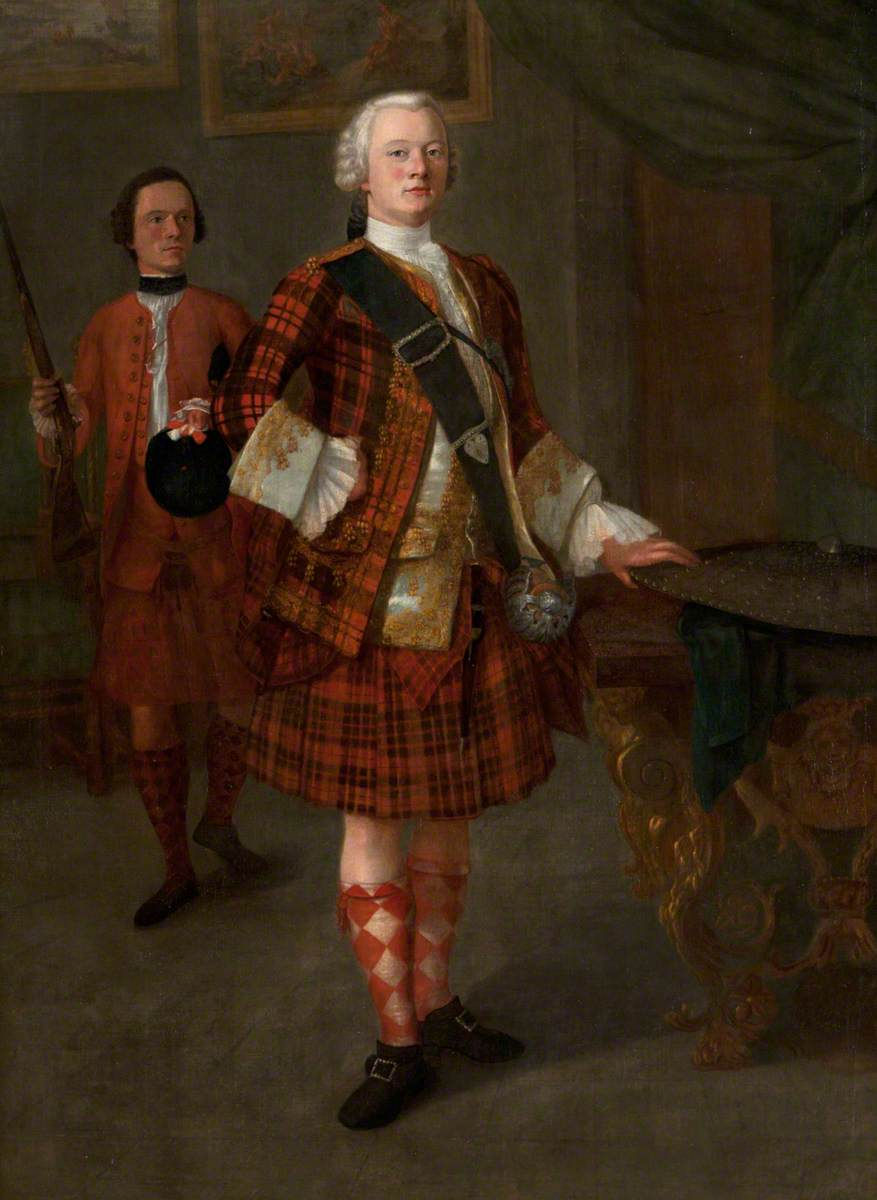
- Tenure: 1754–1761
- Predecessor: John MacDonell, 12th Chief of Glengarry (1754)
- Successor: Duncan MacDonell, 14th Chief of Glengarry (1761)
- Other titles: soi disant Jacobite Lord MacDonald
- Born: 5 January 1725; Invergarry Castle, Scottish Highlands
- Died: 23 December 1761 (aged 36); Invergarry Castle, Scottish Highlands
- Parents: John MacDonell of Glengarry (died 1754); Margaret Mackenzie

Alastair Roy MacDonell of Glengarry (ca 1725–1761; Scottish Gaelic: Alasdair Ruadh MacDomhnaill, was the 13th chief of Clan MacDonell of Glengarry. Brought up as a Catholic and largely educated in France, he was arrested in November 1745 on his way to join the 1745 Jacobite Rising.

After his release from the Tower of London in 1747, MacDonell became a highly damaging mole for the Hanoverian government inside the Jacobite movement. In addition to delivering fellow Jacobite leader Dr. Archibald Cameron of Lochiel to the government, resulting in the latter's 1753 execution at Tyburn, Glengarry is also believed to have been used as an agent of influence to sow dissension within the Jacobite movement over the missing Loch Arkaig treasure. Some sources allege that Glengarry simultaneously "helped himself" to the treasure, but even if he did so, he still could never afford to properly rebuild Invergarry Castle, which had been severely damaged by government troops during the aftermath of the rising.

He became 13th chief of Glengarry in 1754, died unmarried in 1761, and was succeeded by his nephew Duncan. His espionage career remained carefully guarded government secret until 1897, when Scottish historian Andrew Lang confirmed Glengarry's secret identity as "Pickle the Spy".

== Life ==
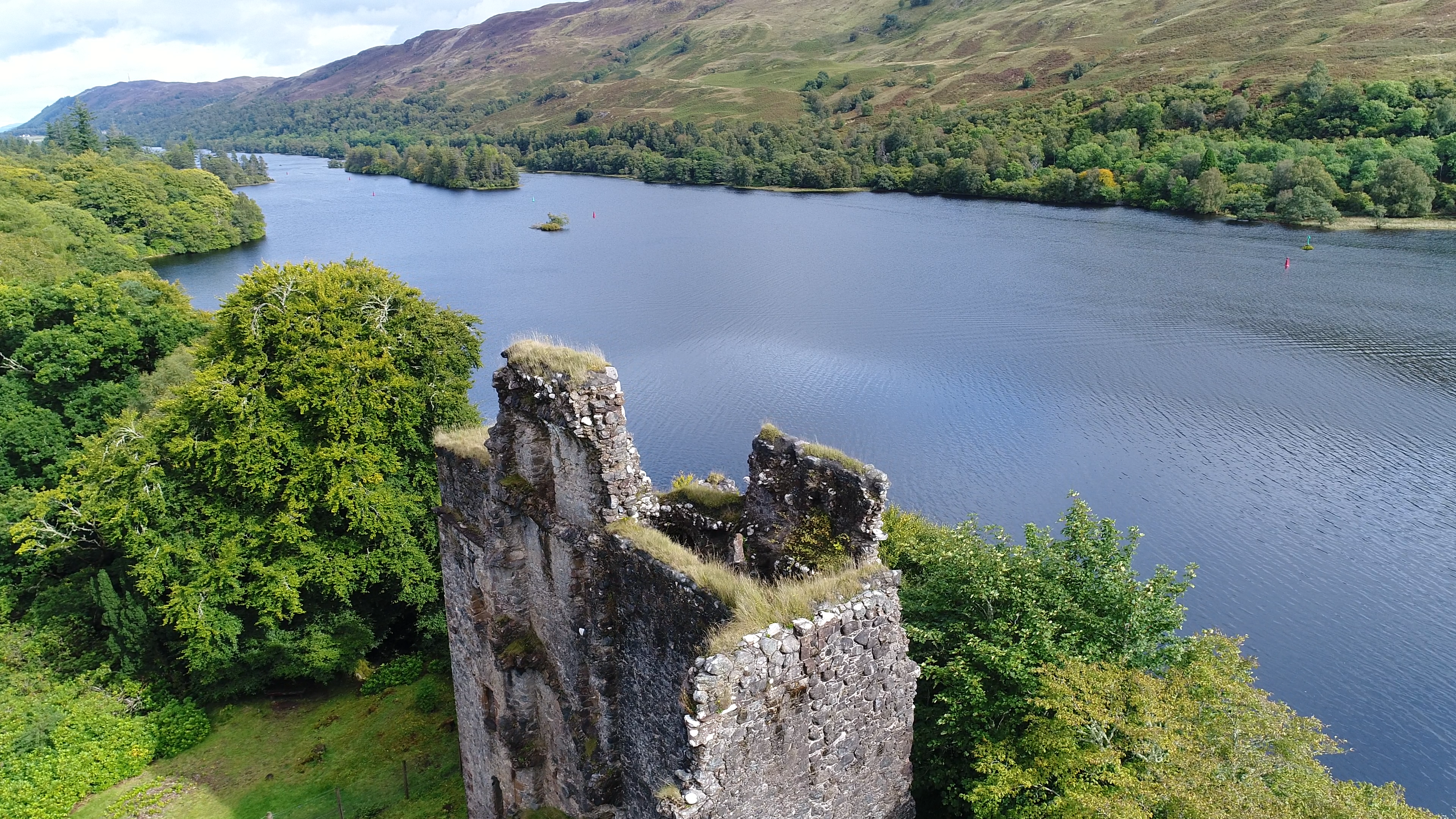
Invergarry Castle ca 2017; MacDonell's family home was destroyed after the 1745 Rising

MacDonell was born about 1725, eldest son of John McDonell of Glengarry (?–1754), a leader of the tiny Scottish Catholic community, and his first wife Margaret Mackenzie. After his mother died in or about 1728, his father married again, this time to Helen Gordon, daughter of John Gordon of Glenbucket (1673–1750).

He had a younger brother Aeneas (also known as Angus) (1727–1746) and a number of half-brothers and sisters from his father's second marriage. These included James (1729–?), Isabel (1731-after 1775), Charles (1732–1763) and four others.

== Jacobite career ==
As was common for many Catholics in this period, MacDonell was sent to France in 1738 to complete his education. This coincided with an improvement in Jacobite prospects for the first time in over two decades, as French and Spanish statesmen looked for ways to reduce the expansion of British commercial strength. The 1740 War of the Austrian Succession placed Britain and France on opposing sides, although they were not yet formally at war and Louis XV proposed an invasion of England in early 1744 to restore the Stuarts. To support this, in late December 1743 Lord John Drummond was authorised to raise a regiment known as the Royal-Ecossais. MacDonell was commissioned into the regiment as captain but the landing was cancelled in March 1744 after the French fleet was severely damaged by winter storms.

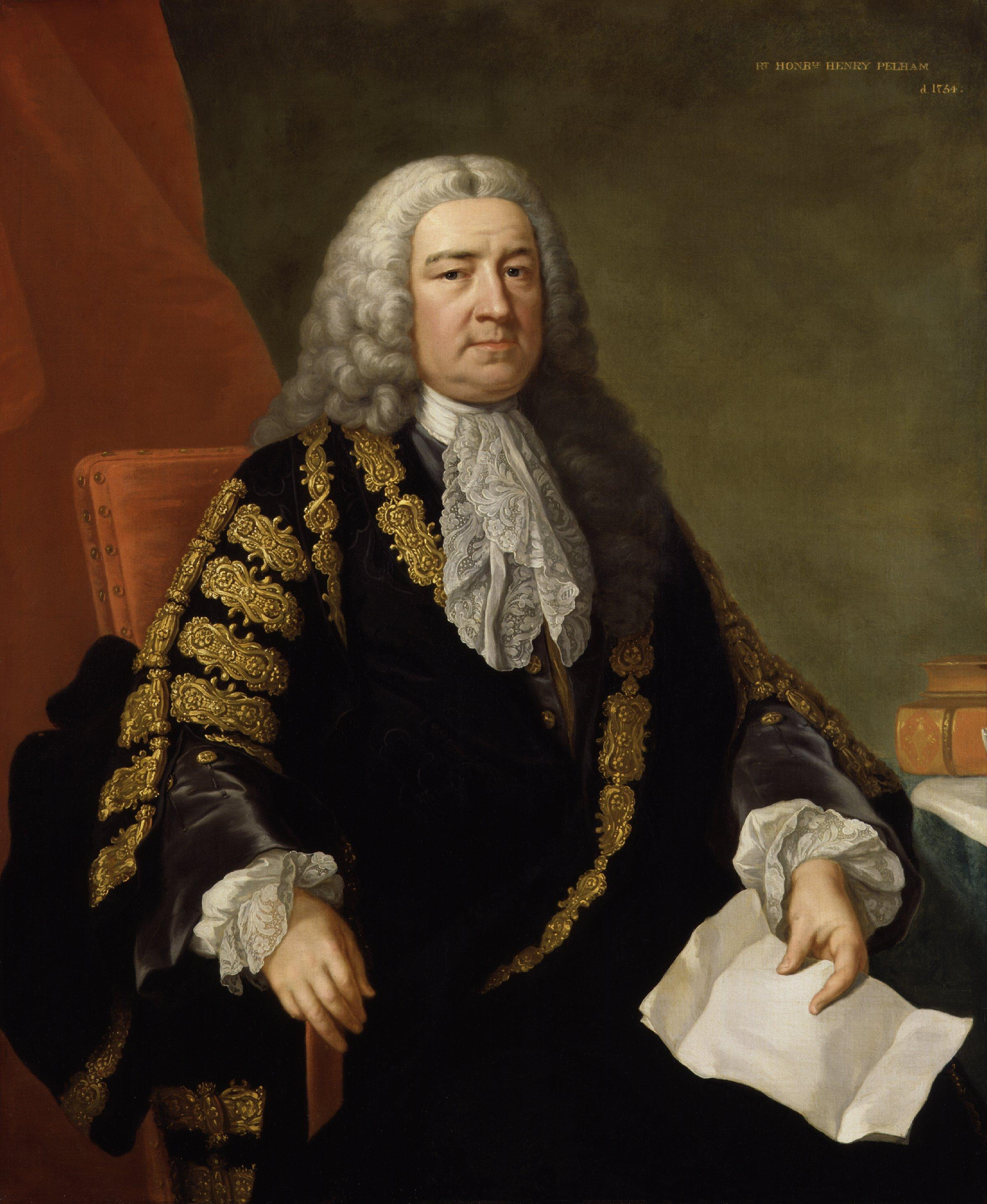
Prime Minister Henry Pelham, who recruited MacDonell as a British agent

In early 1745, Prince Charles, the Stuart heir, began assembling weapons and transport for an alternative landing in Scotland. Heavily dependent on promises of support from a small number of clan chiefs in the western Highlands, it ignored their stipulation this was conditional on the supply of regular French troops, money and weapons. MacDonell was sent to Scotland in spring 1745 to meet with the Jacobite chiefs who reiterated their opposition to his arrival without substantial support. By the time MacDonnell returned, Charles had already sailed.

After the Jacobites achieved considerable success in the early stages of the 1745 Rising, the Royal Écossais was shipped to Scotland in November; the ship carrying MacDonell was intercepted and he joined his father John in the Tower of London. His younger brother Aeneas raised a clan regiment and fought at Falkirk in January 1746 but was accidentally killed after the battle.

Released under the 1747 Act of Indemnity, MacDonell returned to France where he continued to be active in Jacobite plotting.

== Espionage career ==
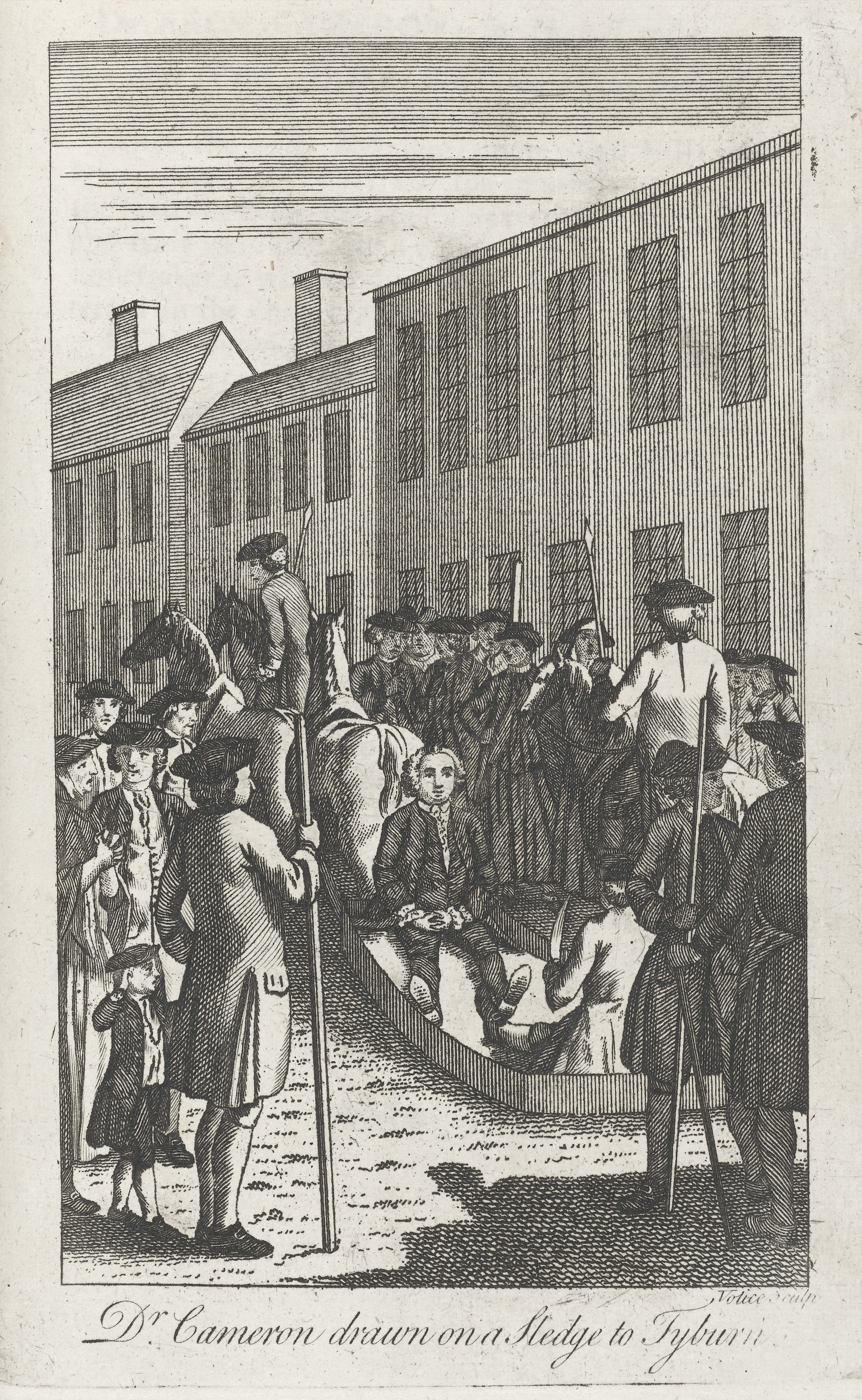
Archibald Cameron being taken to his execution, 1753; he was allegedly captured using information provided by MacDonnell

At some point, he was recruited by Henry Pelham as a Hanoverian mole inside the Jacobite movement known as "Pickle"; this remained secret during his lifetime but his identity was confirmed by the Scottish historian Andrew Lang in 1897. His reasons appear to have been a combination of poverty, resentment at not being compensated for his losses and a liking for the art of deception.

His major coup was providing information on the 1752 Elibank Plot, which led to the arrest in March 1753 of Dr. Archibald Cameron, who had escaped into exile after Culloden. He was tried and executed in June but using the warrant issued in 1746, supposedly to conceal the source of the information. The betrayal of the plot also coincided with the resumption of Prince Charles's affair with Clementina Walkinshaw, whom he first met in 1746; by coincidence, one of her sisters was lady in waiting to the Dowager Princess of Wales and it was widely believed she was the informer.

It has also been suggested MacDonell "helped himself to the Loch Arkaig treasure", a consignment of gold coins provided by the French in June 1746 to finance the Jacobite war effort. This may have been an attempt to explain his secret income from the government; the money certainly existed but there were numerous accounts from contemporaries as to what happened to it, including a detailed account provided by Archibald Cameron in 1750. Cameron's explanation is not complete but since MacDonell was in prison at the time, he was unlikely to have a better idea of its location; modern-day treasure hunters have yet to find any trace of it.

In 1754, Pelham's death ended MacDonell's career as a government informer and he succeeded his father as 13th Chief of Clan MacDonald of Glengarry. He returned home, although Invergarry Castle had been heavily damaged by government troops after the 1745 Rising and, despite his secret income as a spy, he could never afford to restore it. He never married and on his death in 1761, his nephew Duncan succeeded as 14th chief of Glengarry.

== In popular culture ==
MacDonell is fictionalised as ‘Finlay MacPhair of Glenshian’ in D. K. Broster’s novels The Gleam in the North (1927) and The Dark Mile (1929).

== Sources ==
- Davenport-Hines, Richard (2019). Enemies Within;. Williams Collins. ISBN 978-0007516698.
- Douglas, Hugh (2004). MacDonnell, Alasdair Ruadh, of Glengarry [alias Pickle the Spy] (Online ed.). Oxford DNB.
- Harding, Richard (2013). The Emergence of Britain's Global Naval Supremacy: The War of 1739–1748. Boydell Press. ISBN 978-1843838234.
- Lang, Andrew (1897). Pickle the spy; or, The incognito of Prince Charles. Longmans Green.
- McKay, Derek (1983). The Rise of the Great Powers 1648–1815. Routledge. ISBN 978-0582485549.
- Petrie, Charles (1931). "The Elibank Plot, 1752-1753". Transactions of the Royal Historical Society. 14.
- Reid, Stuart (2006). The Scottish Jacobite Army 1745–1746. Osprey. ISBN 978-1846030734.
