= John London (victualler) =

First known black voter in Great Britain

John London (died c. 1770) was an English victualler or publican. He is the earliest recorded black person to have voted in Great Britain, having cast a vote in the 1750 Westminster by-election.

== Biography ==
=== Earliest known black voter ===
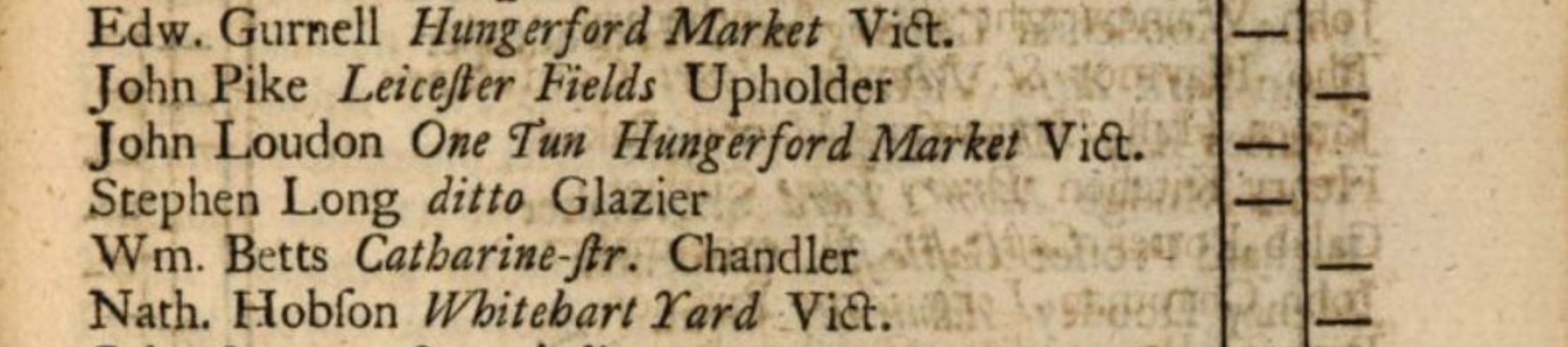
1749 poll book record of John London's vote (third down, listed as "John Loudon")

In 2024, it was discovered via documents relating to the Westminster by-election of November 1749 that London was the earliest black person known to have voted in Great Britain. This was 25 years before the previously earliest known vote cast by Ignatius Sancho.

London was one of "no more than 14% of people who were entitled to vote at the time", due to being male and a rate payer. He was also one of approximately 10,000 black people living in London during the Georgian era, out of approximately 700,000 Londoners. In November 1749, he and his eligible neighbours from the Hungerford Market were among the 9,465 men who voted in by-election for the Westminster constituency; he was recorded as "John Loudon [sic]" in that year's Poll Book voting for Viscount Trentham.

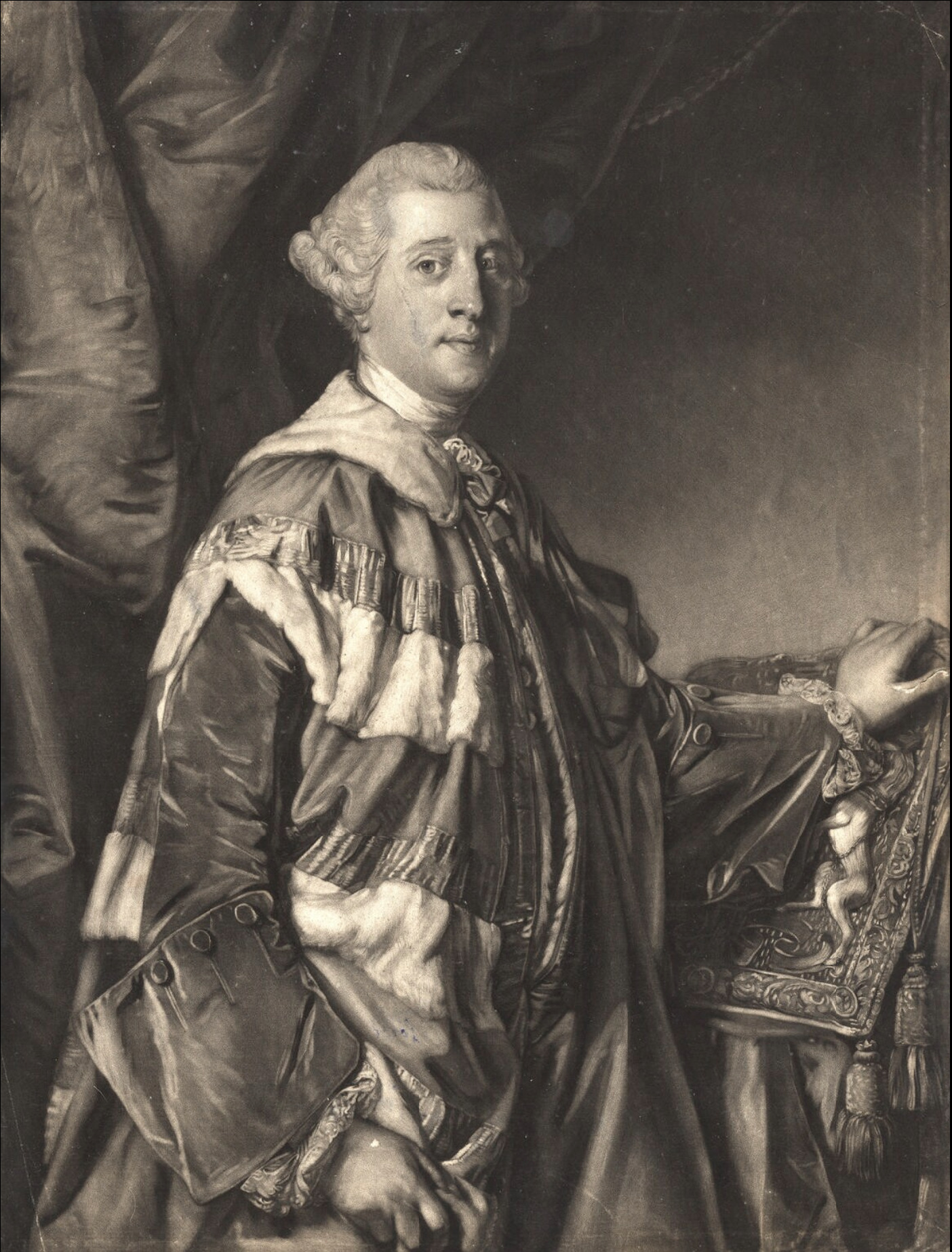
Viscount Trentham, whom London voted for in 1749

As Trentham had won by a majority of just 157 votes, the second place candidate, Sir George Vandeput, 2nd Baronet called for an ex post facto scrutiny of the votes for disqualified voters. London's vote was one of those challenged at the hearing in 1750; voting was restricted to British, male ratepayers, over the age of 21. London had only recently moved into his property on One Tun Alley, but the parish's "overseer of the poor", Mr Rybot, was able to testify that he had paid his rates in September 1749, thereby qualifying for the by-election. Rybot, however, also described London as a "Blackamoor" (i.e. a black or dark-skinned person) which led to further questioning as to where London was born to ascertain if he was British or not; London, having attended the hearing in person, was able to answer that he was born in Bury St Edmunds, Suffolk, England, thereby satisfying the requirement to be British. His vote stood, and his ethnicity was therefore recorded for posterity.

=== Later life ===
London continued to be recorded in the parish's rate book until 1751. His victualling business, likely an alehouse, was called "The Blackamoor's Head". He was then missing from records until spring 1770 when, as a pauper, he was admitted to the St Martin in the Fields workhouse. Having suffered with a fever, he subsequently died in the workhouse.
