= Mitchell baronets of West Shore (1724) =

Escutcheon of the Mitchell baronets, though Rietstap gives a bordure of three rows

The Mitchell baronetcy, of West Shore in Zetland, was created in the Baronetage of Great Britain on 19 June 1724 for John Mitchell, laird of Girlsta, who substituted the title West Shore. He was Steward Depute and Justiciar of the Northern islands.

The title was generally thought to have become extinct or dormant on the death of the 3rd Baronet in 1783. However, in 1895 James William Mitchell was served heir male by the Scottish Sheriff of Chancery and is considered by some sources as the 9th Baronet. He was a descendant of the seventh and youngest son of the 1st Baronet but never assumed the title and neither did his son Hugh Sykes Mitchell.

The baronetcy is extinct, not appearing on the Official Roll.

== Mitchell baronets, of West Shore (1724) ==
- Sir John Mitchell, 1st Baronet (died 1739)
- Sir Andrew Mitchell, 2nd Baronet (c. 1706–1764)
- Sir John Mitchell, 3rd Baronet (1734–1783)
- John Charles Mitchell, presumed 4th Baronet (1709–1790)
- Edward Charles Mitchell, presumed 5th Baronet (1749–1 Oct 1818)
- John Warburton Mitchell, presumed 6th Baronet (1756–1831)
- Joseph Mitchell, presumed 7th Baronet (1762–1833)
- Joseph Theophilus Mitchell, presumed 8th Baronet (1793–1849)
- James William Mitchell, presumed 9th Baronet (1836–1898)
- Hugh Sykes Mitchell, presumed 10th Baronet (1880–1953). He did not assume the title, after efforts to end the dormancy, in 1912.

== Notes ==
Baronetage of Great Britain
Preceded by Vandeput baronets	Mitchell baronets of West Shore; 19 June 1724	Succeeded by Fermor baronets
