= George Vandeput =

Royal Navy Admiral of the Blue (died 1800)

Admiral George Vandeput
- Died: 14 March 1800
- Military career
- Allegiance: Great Britain
- Branch: Royal Navy
- Rank: Admiral of the Blue
- Commands: Lisbon Station; North American Station
- Conflicts: American Revolutionary War

Admiral of the Blue George Vandeput (died 14 March 1800) was a Royal Navy officer who was the illegitimate son of Sir George Vandeput, 2nd Baronet.

== Naval career ==
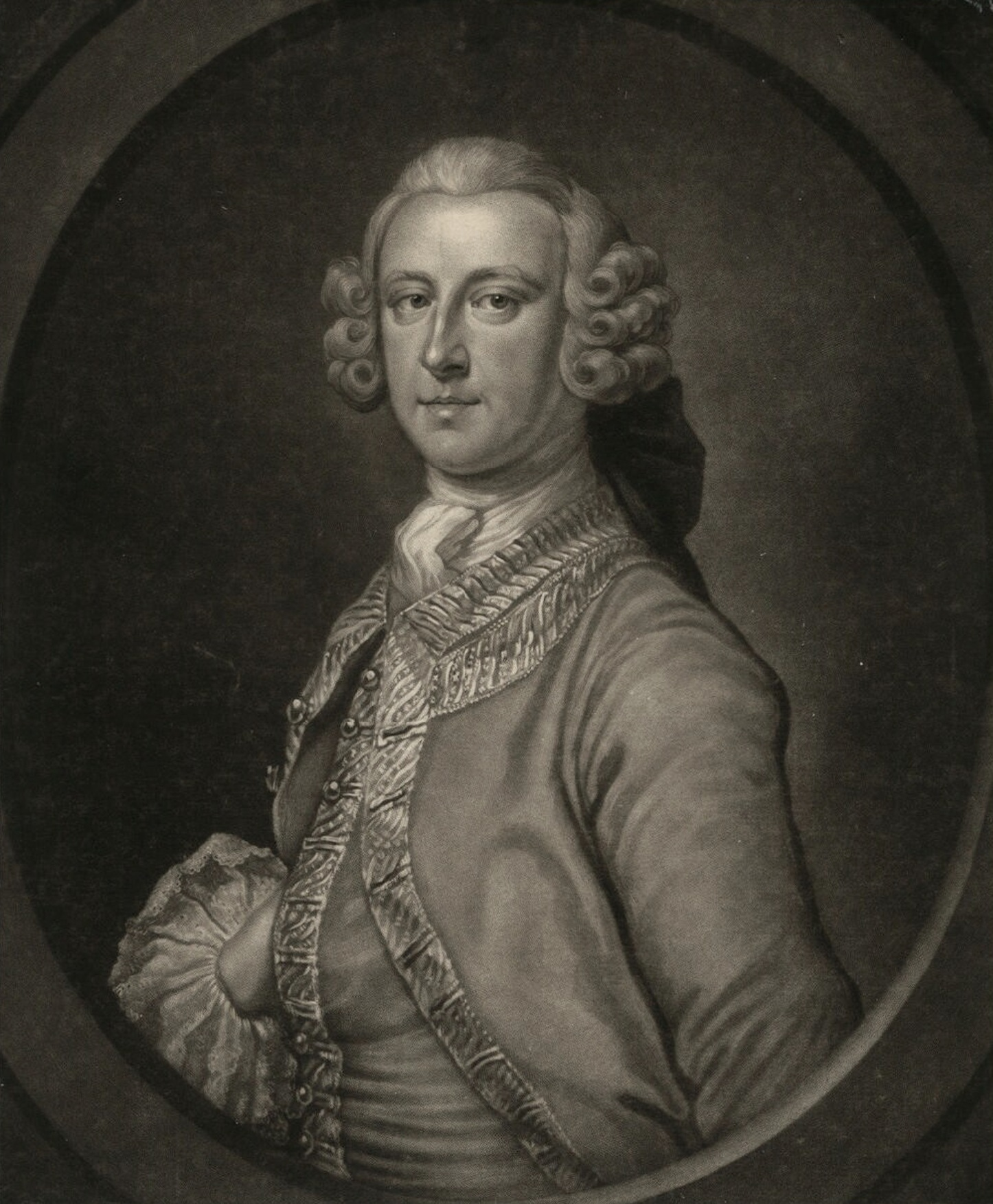
1750 portrait of Vandeput's father, Sir George Vandeput

He was a midshipman on board HMS Neptune (the flagship of Sir Charles Saunders, stationed in the St Lawrence River) by 24 September 1759, on which date he was promoted lieutenant and transferred to the Shrewsbury under Captain Hugh Palliser.

From 1759 to peace in 1763 he served on the Shrewsbury, then on 17 April 1764 he was given his first command, the sloop Goree, soon followed on 20 June 1765 by being made post captain of the Surprise (20 guns). Other commands (Boreas August 1766-June 1767, the 28 gun Carysfort June 1767 – 1770, the Solebay on the home station 1770–1773, and many temporary commands in 1773).

Finally he was appointed captain of Asia just before her commissioning in December 1773, and sailed her to the North American station, where he and she stayed until 1777, mostly in or around New York City and Boston. During this period one of the Asia 's tenders captured a small boat carrying gunpowder. Her crew had intended to be captured and hoped that the gunpowder would be immediately transferred to the Asia's hold and the boat allowed to go free, so that a sabotage device (consisting of a clockwork which would fire a musket lock at a set time) hidden in the gunpowder would go off inside the Asia and destroy her. However, not knowing of the plot, Vandeput ordered the vessel to lie off the Asia for the night with her cargo still on board, and so one of the captured crew confessed the plot for fear that he would be killed by the explosion. It was also in this first service on the Asia that he met and became friends with the marine artist Robert Cleveley.

On her return to England in 1777, the Asia was refitted and sent out to the East Indies, returning to England again in convoy early in 1781, at which point Vandeput was transferred to the Atlas. On board the Atlas, he participated in the relief of Gibraltar and the following battle of Cape Spartel on 20 October 1781. Though neither the Admiralty nor his official standing reflected this, Burke's Peerage states that he assumed the title of baronet after his father's death in 1784 (certainly his own illegitimate son, also called George, also called himself a baronet).

Peace came, after which Vandeput commanded the yacht Princess Augusta until being made a rear admiral on 1 February 1793 then vice admiral on 4 July 1794. For most of 1795 he commanded a small North Sea squadron, then in 1796 convoy escorts from England to the Mediterranean and Lisbon. On the latter his flagship was the St Albans and she remained so in 1797 when he moved to command the North American coastal squadron, though towards the end of 1797 he moved his flag to HMS Resolution then in 1798 to his old ship the Asia. It was on board the Asia that he received promotion to Admiral of the Blue on 14 February 1799, and on which he died suddenly at sea just over a year later. His body was buried on Providence, where it had been transported by HMS Cleopatra.

Military offices
Preceded by George Murray	Commander-in-Chief, North American Station; 1797–1800	Succeeded by Sir William Parker
