= Bosavern Penlez =

British wig maker and rioter

- Born: 1726
- Died: 18 October 1749 (aged 22–23)
- Cause of death: Hanged
- Occupation: Wig maker
- Conviction: Rioting
- Penalty: Death

Bosavern Penlez (1726–1749) was a British wig maker who was convicted and executed for rioting along with co-defendant John Wilson. He was sentenced to death and thus hanged on 18 October 1749.

Bosavern is believed to have been mistakenly identified, although he was present at the time of the riot. Penlez was the subject of a 55-page treatise by Henry Fielding entitled "The Case of the Unfortunate Bosavern Penlez" that year. Penlez was given a proper burial after a last-minute attempt to save him failed.

== Bosavern Penlez's life ==
Bosavern Penlez was born in Exeter, Devon, in 1726. His father was a clergyman of the Church of England, who, when alive, gave his son a good education.

Subsequent to his father's death, the Stuarts of the Sons of Clergy took care of Bosavern, and, when he was old enough they apprenticed him to a barber and wig maker in the city of Exeter. Bosavern worked there for about seven years (the normal length of time for apprenticeships at that time), before deciding to move to London with the hope of setting up a business of his own. Bosavern remained in London until the night he was arrested for allegedly being involved in the Riot at the brothel "The Star", located in the Strand.

== Bosavern's arrest ==
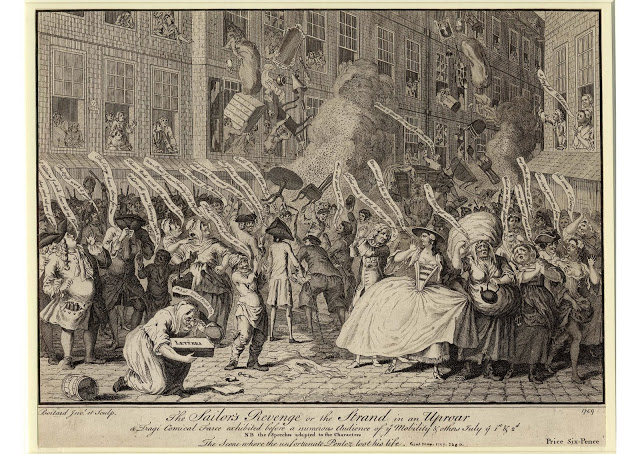
The Sailor's Revenge, or the Strand in an Uproar. (1 July 1749)

The riot at "The Star" was part of a wave of riots started the previous night by some sailors. The seamen had stopped at the brothel "The Crown" where they had been robbed of their watches, bank-notes, and some money. Upon their demand of being remunerated for their loss, they were pushed out of the brothel and therefore decided to seek revenge. At that time popular vengeance was very often targeted on brothels, as they were considered houses of sin, and in a society prevailed by religious fanaticism sin was believed to be the first step towards crime.

On that occasion, the Sailors gathered some of their companions and the group returned at night and broke into the brothel, turning the women into the street, breaking the windows and furniture and setting the building on fire. However, their fury didn't stop with the destruction of "The Crown" and the following night they attacked two other brothels, the second of which was "The Star".

As was usual in cases of rioting, a body of soldiers was called upon to restore order. This led to the arrest of several men. Bosavern was not arrested until later the same night, when a watchmen found him, drunk, in an alley not far from "The Star", with a bundle in his hands. When the watchman asked what he had in his hands, Bosavern answered:

"I am an unfortunate young man, and have married one of the women of the town, who hath pawned all my clothes, and I have got all her linen for it".

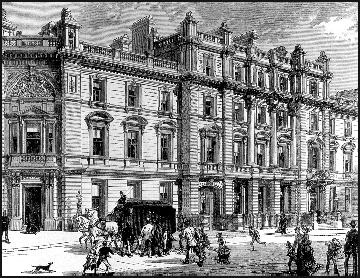
Bow street, late 19th century

The bundle of linen he was hiding under his clothes consisted of caps, handkerchiefs, ruffles, clouts and aprons. Once taken to the watchhouse, Bosavern claimed a different version about the bundle, saying he had found it in the street. It was a lie.

The next day he and other prisoners were examined by the justice of peace Henry Fielding, at his house in Bow Street. There, Jane Wood, wife of the keeper of "The Star" recognized the linen as being of her own property. During the justice's interview with Bosavern, rioters gathered outside the house and claimed the intention to break in.

As a result, all the prisoners were committed to the Prison of Newgate, to be tried with the charge of:

"High treason in levying war against his majesty by riotously and tumultuously assembling themselves together in order to suppress and pull down all bawdy houses".

== Awaiting Trial ==
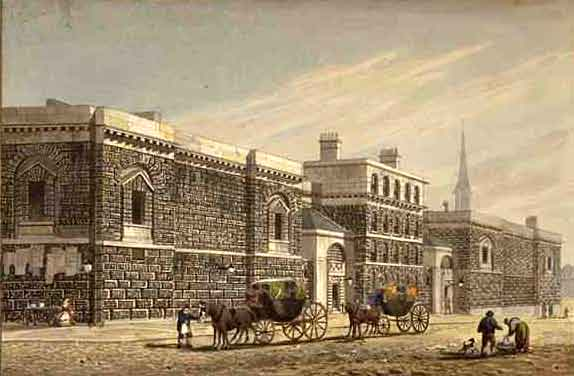
Newgate Prison between in 18th century.

During the awaiting for the trial, many of the prisoners convicted were rescued by the mob. Unfortunately one of them died, so that in the end only 5 people including Bosavern remained in custody. All five of them were charged by terms of the Riot Act of 1715. The decision, which entailed death penalty, led to many controversies as it was regarded as an act of tyranny, considering that rioters were usually only fined. What’s more, one of the main articles of the Riot Act, stated that a magistrate had to read a proclamation to disperse the riot. A proclamation that was never actually read.

For this reason, the grand jury rejected the charges against two of the prisoners, thus reducing to three the number of prisoners actually tried. Bosavern Penlez, John Wilson and Benjamin Ladder were charged for:

"being feloniously and riotously assembled to the disturbance of the public peace, did begin to demolish the dwelling house of Peter Wood"

== The Trial ==
Peter Wood, keeper of "The Star", was the main witness for prosecution and his testimony was supported by his wife and his servant. During the cross-examination Wood's wife and servant gave contradictory evidences, whilst other witnesses testified to Peter Wood's bad character. What's more it was found that he hadn't paid the rubbish removal tax and that he served liquors without having a license.

Benjamin Ladder was found to have an alibi, as, a soldier on the way to "The Star" met him on the road and asked Ladder to go buy a pint of beer for him. This evidence discredited Wood's testimony of Ladder being inside "The Star" and causing any damage before the soldiers arrived. Upon this evidence, Ladder was acquitted and only Bosavern and Wilson were sentenced to death.

This sentence led to a wave of contrasting opinions among the public, which resulted in a petition to the King for the suspension of the punishment. Seen that even the jurors who had previously convicted Penlez and Wilson, signed the petition, and that Peter Wood's testimony could not be trusted, Wilson was pardoned, but not Penlez.

== The Final Sentence ==
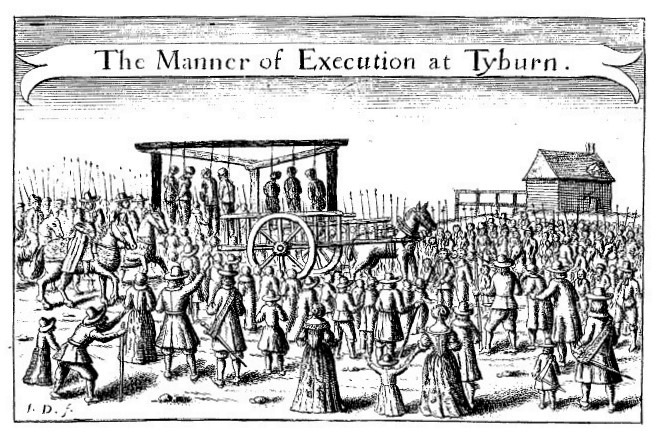
Execution at Tyburn, in a seventeenth century print.

When he was taken, Penlez was indicted for both burglary (for having stolen Jane Wood's linen) and rioting (for having been found destroying "The Star"), but once convicted for one charge, the judge decided he couldn't be tried again for another charge related to the same circumstances of the first one. The public opinion was oblivious to Penlez's second indictment, which was brought to the attention of the crown by Henry Fielding. The king, thus found himself divided between the desire to pardon the defendants and the will to provide a representative punishment that could prevent the mob from setting up further riots. The decision to pardon Wilson and execute Penlez was taken in the light of Penlez's additional charge of theft. Bosavern Penlez was executed at Tyburn on Wednesday 18 October 1749.

== Post Sentence Criticism ==
Public opinion against Penlez's execution went on throughout autumn, and the case became a key issue during the 1750 Westminster by-election. Public's opinion mainly rested on the government candidate, Lord Trentham's, inability to obtain a pardon for Penlez. Later on, in November an anonymous author published a pamphlet entitled "The case of the unfortunate Bosavern Penlez", claiming the utterly unjust execution of Penlez. The pamphlet attacked Wood's testimony about Ladder, referring to it as "a pack of lies". Therefore, if he indeed had lied about Ladder he shouldn't have been trusted regarding Penlez. This claim constituted a criticism on Henry Fielding's conduct, as he was the one to shed light on Penlez's second indictment.

Fielding, not wanting his reputation to be put at stake, published a pamphlet entitled "A true State of the case of Bosavern Penlez", in which he defended the way in which he had handled the case.
