= Ballencrieff Castle =

Large tower house at Ballencrieff, East Lothian, Scotland

Coordinates: 55°59′41″N 2°49′22″W

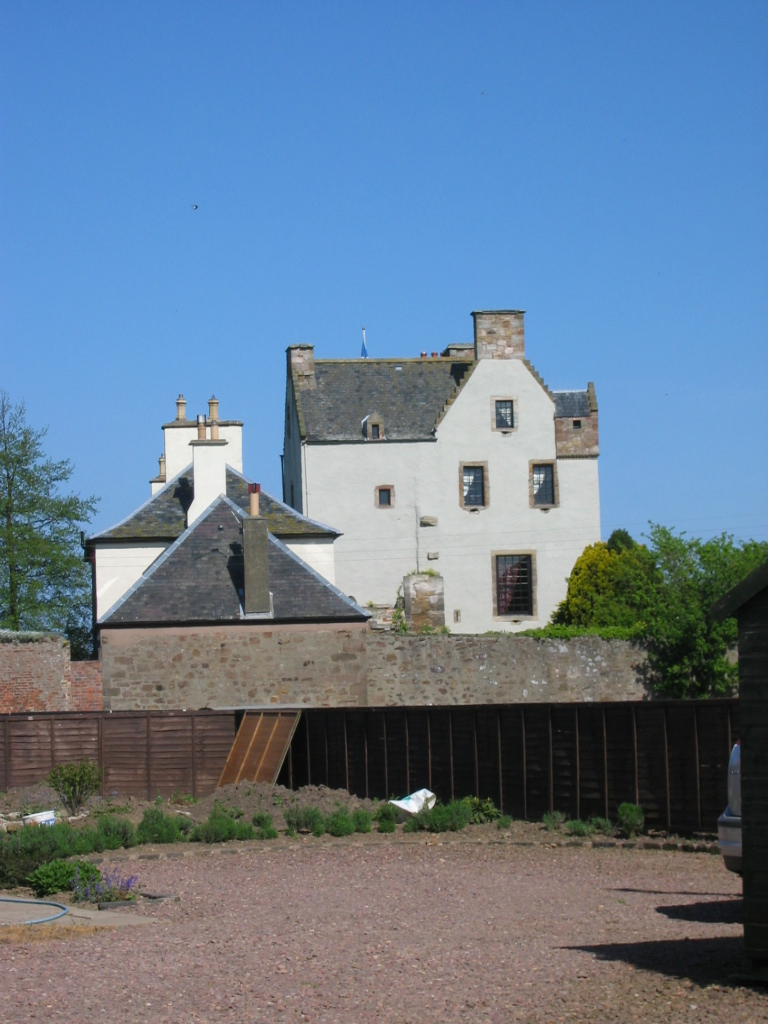
Ballencrieff Castle from the west

Ballencrieff Castle, also known as Ballencrieff House, is a large tower house at Ballencrieff, East Lothian, Scotland. It is located three miles north west of Haddington, and one mile south of Aberlady.

== History ==
The castle was built in 1507 when King James IV ordered his private secretary James Murray to build himself a fortified house at Ballencrieff. It was destroyed in or around 1545.

From around 1550 to 1580 the house was owned (and presumably rebuilt) by David Borthwick, Lord Lochill who renamed it Lochill Castle. In 1608 the Ballencrieff estate was bought by Bernard Lindsay of Lochhill, owner of the King's Wark, and then to Sir Patrick Murray in 1632, In 1679 it passed to Sir Peter Wedderburn.

General James Murray, a Governor of Canada, was baptised in Aberlady, and is said to have been born at Ballencrieff, in 1721. If so this suggests that his father Alexander, 4th Lord Elibank, George's father, was then resident there. The house burnt down accidentally in 1868, and a small garden cottage was built using the stone from the castle. The cottage still currently stands within the grounds of the walled garden. The castle stood roofless until it was restored between 1992 and 1997. It is now privately owned, and it is situated next to a free range rare breed pig farm.

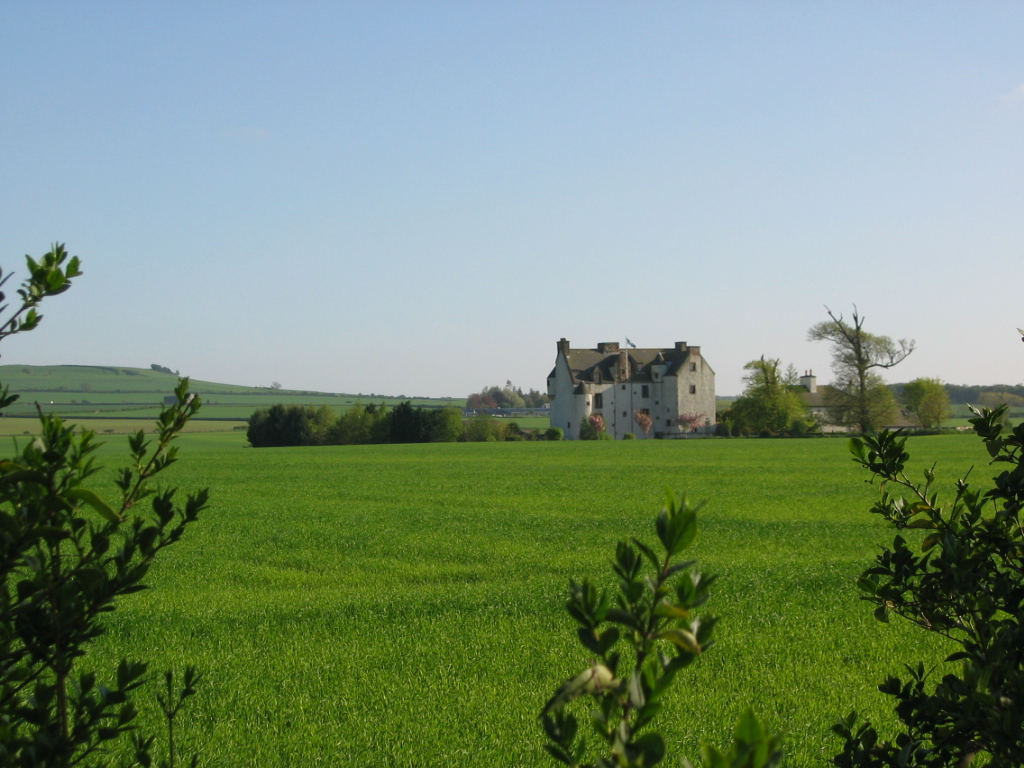
Ballencrieff Castle from the north

The long, rectangular-plan, tower has three storeys, including a vaulted basement, with a near-symmetrical north front. The tall, narrow south-east wing has crow-step gables. The castle, along with its walled garden and pavilion, is a category B listed building. During restoration works, 16th-century gun holes and wooden draw-bars on the windows, were discovered in the ruins. The remains of two early 17th-century moulded plaster ceilings with the initials and heraldry of Gideon Murray, and the remnants of an elaborate fireplace, were found on the first floor.

== See also ==
- List of places in East Lothian
- List of places in Scotland
