= Vandeput baronets =

Title in the Baronetage of Great Britain

- Escutcheon of the Vandeput baronets of Twickenham
- Creation date: 1723
- Status: Extinct
- Extinction date: 1784

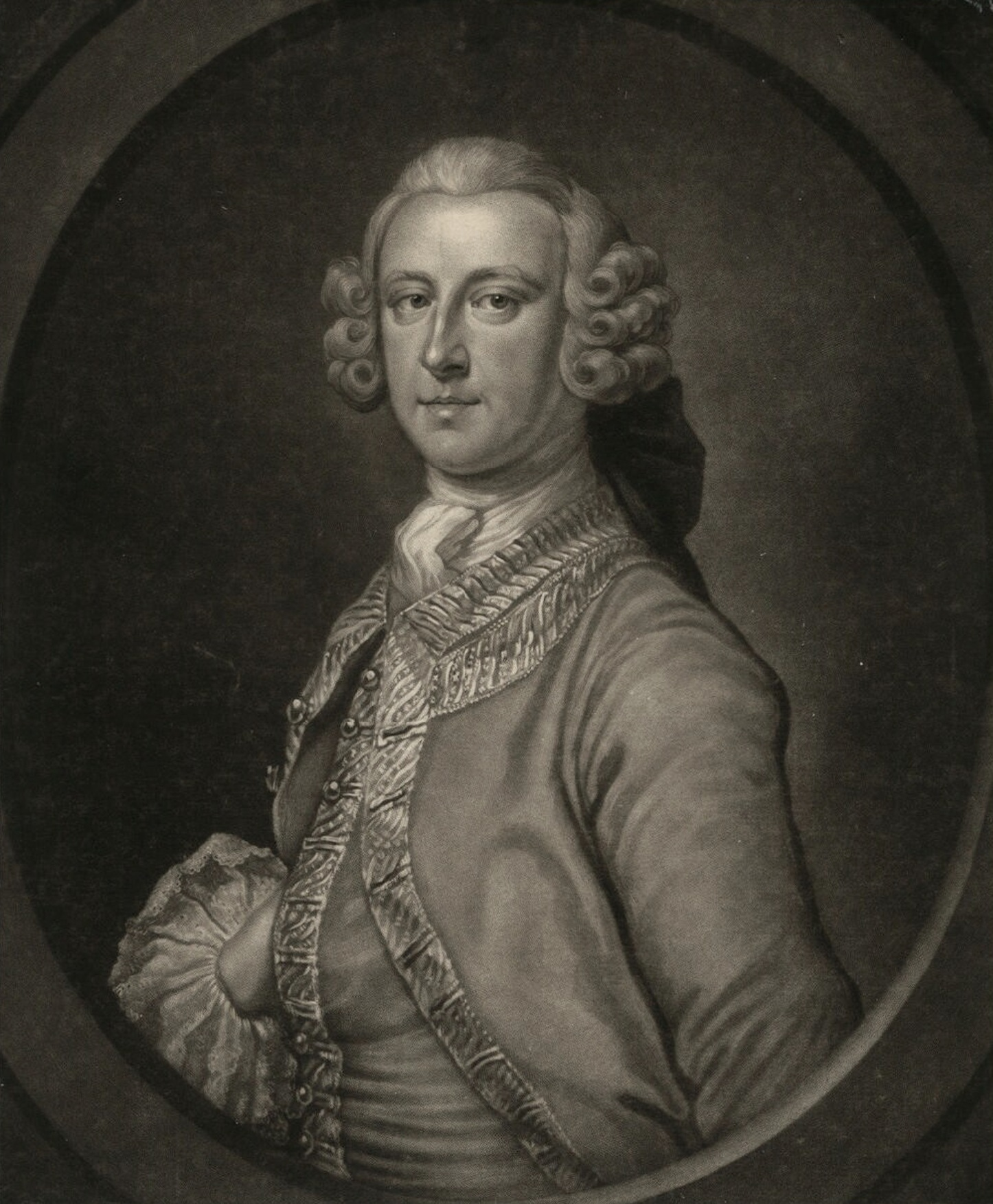
1750 portrait of Sir George Vandeput, 2nd Baronet

The Vandeput baronetcy, of Twickenham in the County of Middlesex, was a title in the Baronetage of Great Britain. It was created on 7 November 1723 for Peter Vandeput, son of Sir Peter Vandeput and his wife Margaret Buckworth, sister of Sir John Buckworth, 1st Baronet. The title became extinct on the death of the 2nd Baronet in 1784.

== History ==
Peter Vandeput was a wealthy merchant and alderman of the City of London who was descended from a line of Flemish traders who had settled in England. In 1726 he purchased the manor of Standlynch in Wiltshire. Between 1731 and 1734, he commissioned the architect John James of Greenwich to design and build Standlynch House (later known as Trafalgar House) in the Palladian style.

He was succeeded in 1748 by his eldest son, George, the 2nd Baronet. He was a Tory noted for unsuccessfully contesting the 1750 Westminster by-election. The costs he incurred likely resulted in the sale of the Standlynch estate by auction under a Chancery order in 1752. He married Mary Judith Schutz, (1717-1777), daughter of Augustus Schutz of Shotover Park, and had a daughter, Frances (1755-1787) who married Richard Vere Drury. His second wife was his former mistress, Philadelphia Geary, (1730-1806), whith whom he had already fathered at least two children, including Philadelphia, (1753-1830) who married Charles Smyth, (1752-1792), son of the Rev. Sir William Smyth, 6th baronet of Hill Hall, (1719-1777). With no legitimate male issue, the title became extinct upon his death in 1784. George Vandeput, his illegitimate son, was an Admiral in the Royal Navy.

== Vandeput baronets, of Twickenham (1723) ==
- Sir Peter Vandeput, 1st Baronet (c. 1688–1748)
- Sir George Vandeput, 2nd Baronet (c. 1717–1784)

Baronetage of Great Britain
Preceded by Frederick baronets	Vandeput baronets of Twickenham; 7 November 1723	Succeeded by Mitchell baronets
