= Royal Infirmary =

Royal Infirmary may refer to a number of hospitals in the United Kingdom:

- England
  - Blackburn Royal Infirmary
  - Bradford Royal Infirmary
  - Bolton Royal Infirmary
  - Bristol Royal Infirmary
  - Chester Royal Infirmary
  - Derbyshire Royal Infirmary
  - Doncaster Royal Infirmary
  - Gloucestershire Royal Infirmary
  - Royal Halifax Infirmary
  - Huddersfield Royal Infirmary
  - Hull Royal Infirmary
  - Lancaster Royal Infirmary
  - Leicester Royal Infirmary
  - Liverpool Royal Infirmary
  - Royal Infirmary for Children and Women, Lambeth, London
  - Manchester Royal Infirmary
  - Royal Victoria Infirmary, Newcastle
  - North Staffordshire Royal Infirmary
  - Preston Royal Infirmary
  - Salford Royal Infirmary
  - Sheffield Royal Infirmary
- Scotland
  - Aberdeen Royal Infirmary
  - Dumfries and Galloway Royal Infirmary
  - Dundee Royal Infirmary
  - Edinburgh Royal Infirmary
  - Falkirk Royal Infirmary
  - Glasgow Royal Infirmary
  - Greenock Royal Infirmary
  - Montrose Royal Infirmary
  - Perth Royal Infirmary
  - Stirling Royal Infirmary
- Wales
  - Cardiff Royal Infirmary
