= Grangemouth =

Coordinates: 56°1′11″N 3°43′21″W

Grangemouth: Scottish Gaelic: Inbhir Ghrainnse; Scots: Grangemooth
- Town
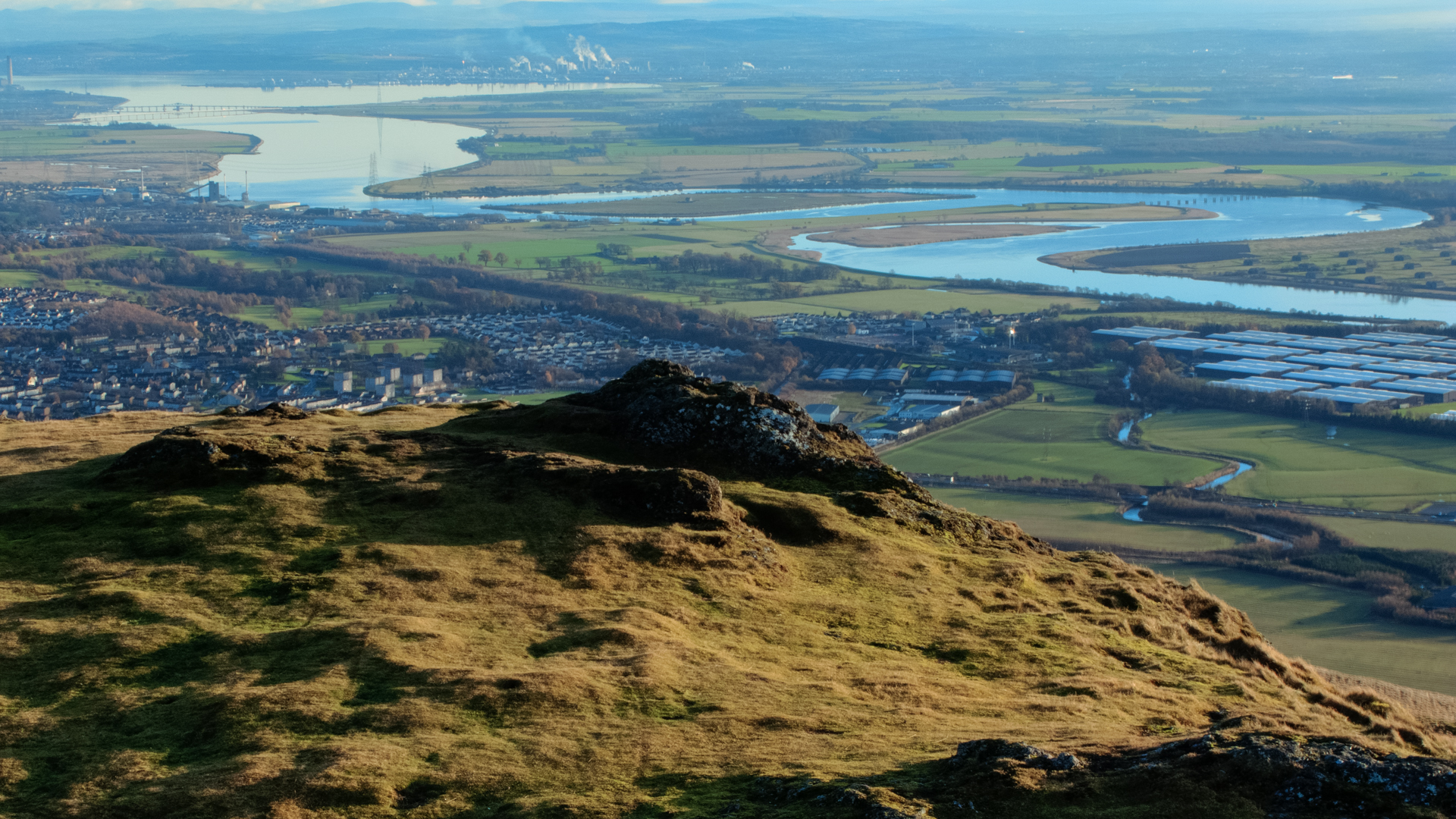
- A view over Grangemouth from Dumyat, December 2013

- Location within the Falkirk council area
- Area: 4.12 sq mi (10.7 km^{2})
- Population: 16,016 (2022)
  - Density: 3,887/sq mi (1,501/km^{2})
- Demonym: Portonian
- OS grid reference: NS935815
  - Edinburgh: 21 mi (34 km) SE
  - London: 345 mi (555 km) SSE
- Council area: Falkirk
- Lieutenancy area: Stirling and Falkirk
- Country: Scotland
- Sovereign state: United Kingdom
- Post town: GRANGEMOUTH
- Postcode district: FK3
- Dialling code: 01324
- Police: Scotland
- Fire: Scottish
- Ambulance: Scottish
- UK Parliament: Alloa and Grangemouth
- Scottish Parliament: Falkirk East
- Website: falkirk.gov.uk/search/?q=grangemouth

Grangemouth (Scots: Grangemooth; Scottish Gaelic: Inbhir Ghrainnse, pronounced [ˈiɲɪɾʲ ˈɣɾaiɲʃə]) is a town in the Falkirk council area in the central belt of Scotland. Historically part of the county of Stirlingshire, the town lies in the Forth Valley, on the banks of the Firth of Forth, three miles (five kilometres) east of Falkirk, five miles (eight kilometres) west of Bo'ness and 13 miles (21 km) south-east of Stirling. Grangemouth had a resident population of 16,016 in 2022, indicating a decrease from the 2011 census, being 17,373.

Grangemouth's original growth as a town relied mainly on its geographical location. Originally a bustling port, trade flowed through the town with the construction of the Forth and Clyde Canal in the 18th century. Nowadays, the economy of Grangemouth is focused primarily on the large petrochemical industry of the area which includes the oil refinery, owned by Ineos, one of the largest of its kind in Europe. Residents of the town are known as Portonians.

== History ==
Grangemouth was founded by Sir Lawrence Dundas in 1768 as a result of the construction of the Forth and Clyde Canal. Originally referred to as Sealock by workers brought in to labour on the canal digging and lock constructions, the name referred to the Forth and Clyde Canal connection to the sea and where it flowed into the River Forth. After Dundas died in 1781 his son Thomas Dundas commissioned the architect Henry Holland to re-plan the town including the layout around the canal and its basin. The settlement acquired the name Grangeburnmouth and later Grangemouth, referring to its situation at the mouth of the Grange Burn (which originally entered the Carron at Grangemouth Harbour, though it has since been diverted to flow straight into the Forth).

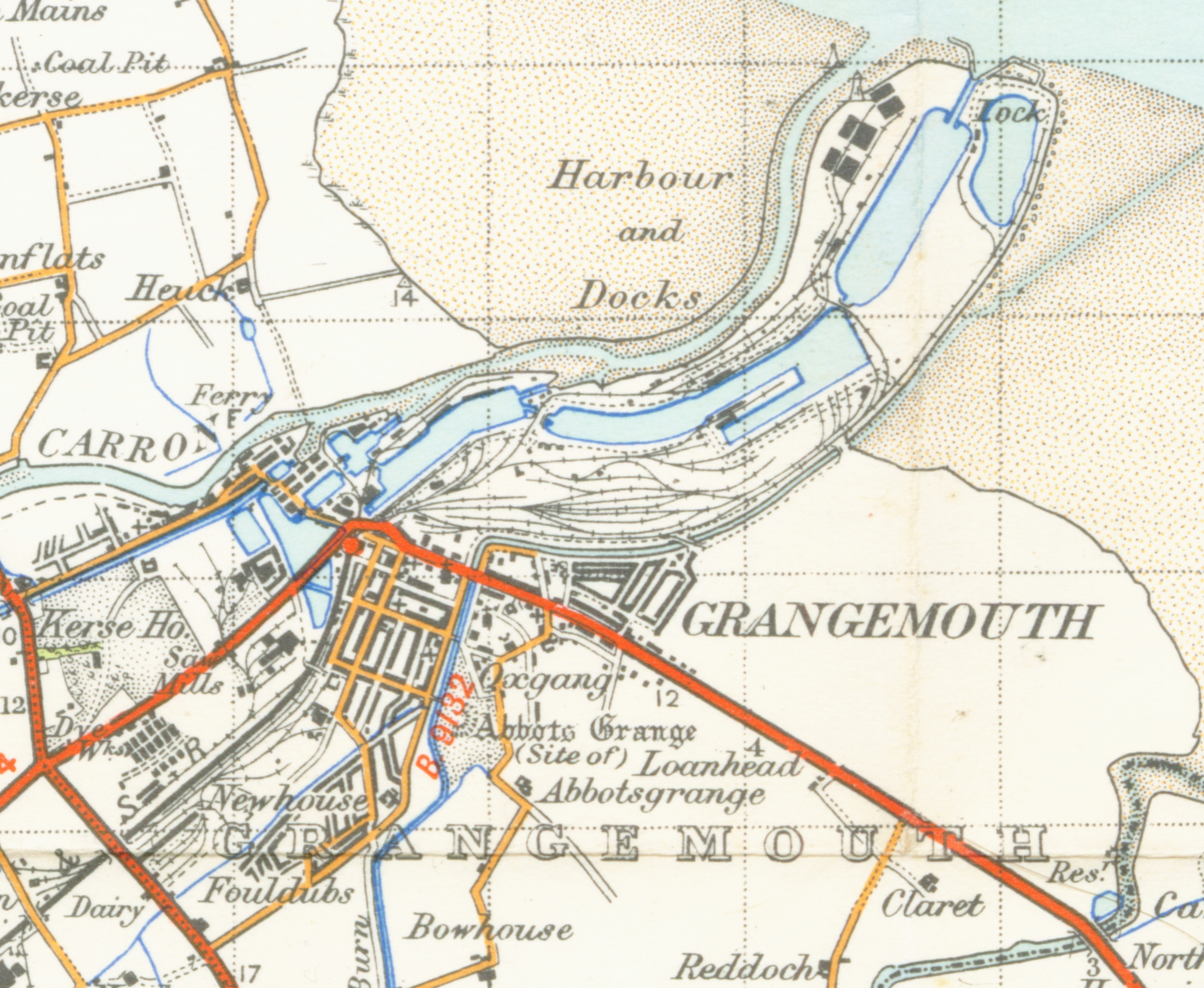
A map of Grangemouth from 1945

As canal and general shipping traffic came to the town the area became more prosperous. This was aided by the high tariffs at the port of Leith which caused more traffic to pass through Grangemouth instead. Additionally, the dredging and a major re-alignment of the River Carron for deeper draught vessels and the founding of collieries to the North of the town saw the increase in trade to and from the Baltic States. Being downstream from the world-famous Carron Company also increased the volume of shipping to the town as cast iron products and armaments were transported around the globe. Until 1810, duties had to paid on cargoes through the customs house at Bo'ness which benefited from the duties paid and involved a journey of some four or five miles each way. With poor roading between the towns, ships captains and agents had to undertake multiple journeys by foot or by horse and cart to register cargoes and pay their duties in weathers fair and foul. After years of appealing Grangemouth was granted its own Customhouse and a fine three storied stone building was erected on the Northern side of the harbour.

The 1830s saw 750 ships in port and over 3,000 trade journeys using the canal. The local shipyard had a graving or drydock built by the Earl of Zetland in 1811 and commenced building larger and larger vessels. The harbour and the river were unable to handle the volume of shipping and larger vessels had to rely completely on the tide to reach wharves on the river bank. A new dock was commissioned to be built and dredging and further re-alignment of the River Carron were undertaken. 200 men dug out what is now called the Old Dock and lock gates were built, allowing vessels to enter the port at any time and tide. A canal link to the south west was named Junction lock and it was also connected to the canal. This allowed timber logs from Scandinavia to be floated in rafts right up to the sawmills almost a mile inland.

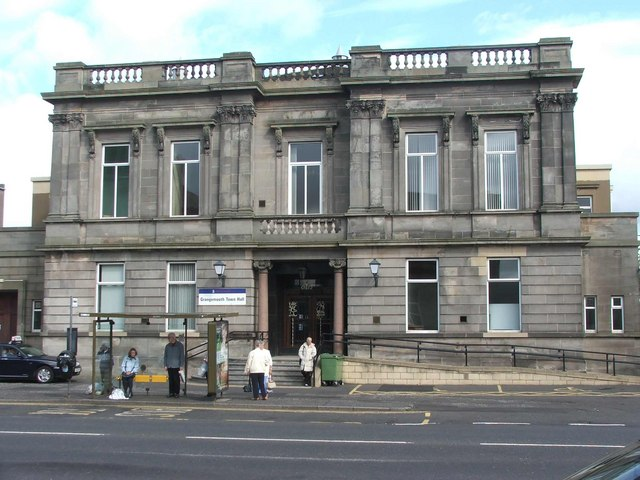
Grangemouth Town Hall

Over the next 50 years the docks would be increased in size fourfold or more with a major land reclamation in the late 1890s pushing the entrance of the docks to the River Forth and avoiding the Carron with its limited depth and width. There was also Grangemouth Dockyard Company established in 1885. Grangemouth Town Hall was designed by William Black and was completed the same year.

In November 1914 the Admiralty requisitioned Grangemouth Docks and they were banned to merchant shipping for the remaining duration of the First World War. During this period the dock was referred to as HMS Rameses in military circles.

A 1936 LMS advert said that the docks had 121 acres (49 hectares) of water (excluding timber basins), direct access to the Forth and Clyde Canal ("giving through access to Glasgow and the Clyde") and handled 3,250,000 long tons (3,300,000 tonnes) of goods a year. The now re-opened canal no longer passes through the old part of Grangemouth, but joins the tidal River Carron. The Municipal Buildings were designed by Robert Wilson and David Tait and completed in 1937.

The original two townships were almost totally demolished in the 1960s as a result of poor planning decisions. The last vestiges of the original old town were the Queens Hotel and the Institute Building (built 1876) which were demolished at that time.

== Economy ==
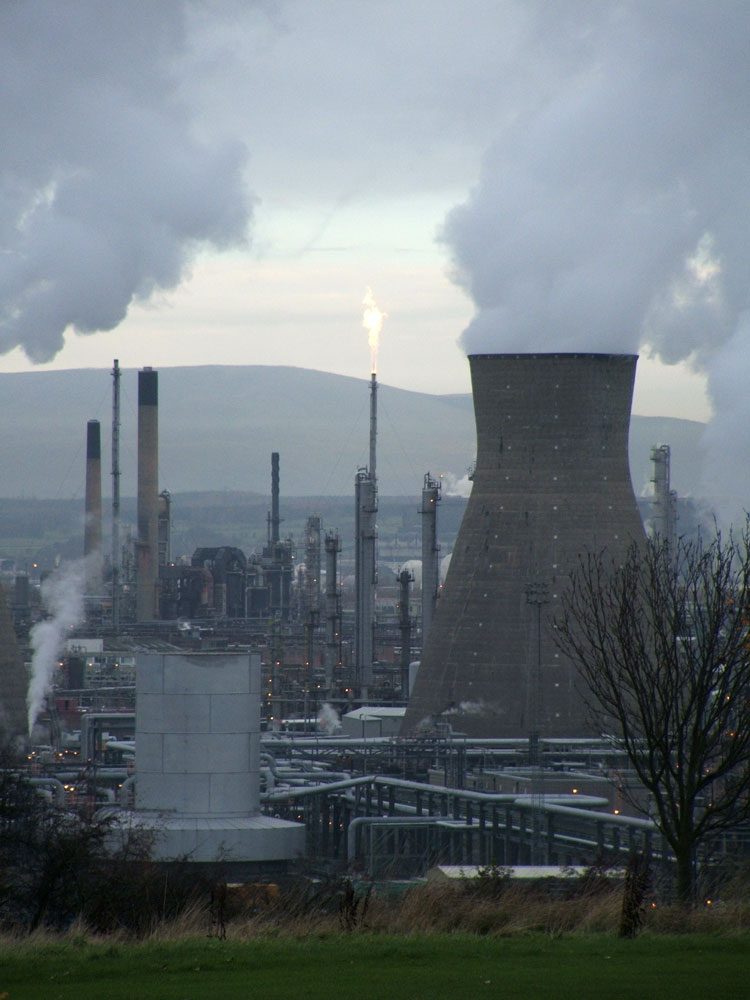
Grangemouth Refinery

Grangemouth Port is one of the main ports in the UK with the largest container terminal in Scotland, with 9 million tonnes of cargo handled through the dock facilities each year. There are links to the inter-modal freight facilities elsewhere in the town which use the town's motorway connections.

The main industry of Grangemouth and the wider Falkirk council area was focused on the Grangemouth Refinery which employed a significant workforce and was one of the largest of its kind in Europe until it was closed in spring 2025.

The Soap Works building which was used to manufacture soap and glycerine, and owned by the Scottish Co-operative 'Wholesale Society' was established in 1897. This was the largest works of its kind in Scotland and employed a considerable number of local people. It was demolished in November 2005 to make way for a new Whyte & Mackay blending and bottling plant.

Grangemouth has an Air Training Corps Squadron, 1333 (Grangemouth) Squadron (located at the TA Centre in Central Avenue), an Army Cadet Detachment (also in Central Avenue) and a Sea and Marine cadet corps at Grangemouth Docks.

The area is covered by NHS Forth Valley and with the recent downgrading of the Falkirk and Stirling Hospitals, all major services have been transferred to the Forth Valley Royal Hospital in nearby Larbert, opened 2010.

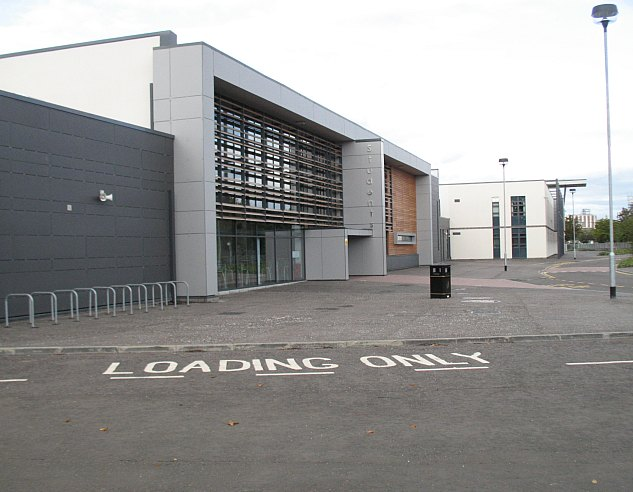
Grangemouth High School

== Education ==
Grangemouth has four primary schools: Bowhouse Primary School, Beancross Primary School, Moray Primary School and Sacred Heart R.C. Primary School. The former three are within the catchment area of Grangemouth High School and the latter is a catchment primary school for St. Mungo's High School. Grangemouth High School was recently rebuilt with new facilities such as an indoor swimming pool, dance studio, a gym, and an outdoor football pitch. For many years Grangemouth had a three-tier school system - the only area in Scotland to do so. This ended in 1988.

== Transport ==
Grangemouth has access to three nearby railway stations: Falkirk High, Falkirk Grahamston and Polmont.

== Culture ==
=== Recreation ===
Grangemouth has an international-standard sports stadium and sports centre. Grangemouth Stadium was built in 1966 for the citizens of Grangemouth, partly funded by BP. The stadium has been extended to host a 150-metre running track, physio room, and weight-lifting. The stadium is used as the National Indoor Sports Stadium and for the Football Referees' Fitness Test for Stirlingshire. It was announced in August 2014 that the temporary running track used at Hampden Park for the athletics programme at the 2014 Commonwealth Games would be installed at Grangemouth Stadium. The Games legacy programme also agreed to donate £30,000 worth of sports equipment to Falkirk Community Trust, which runs the stadium.

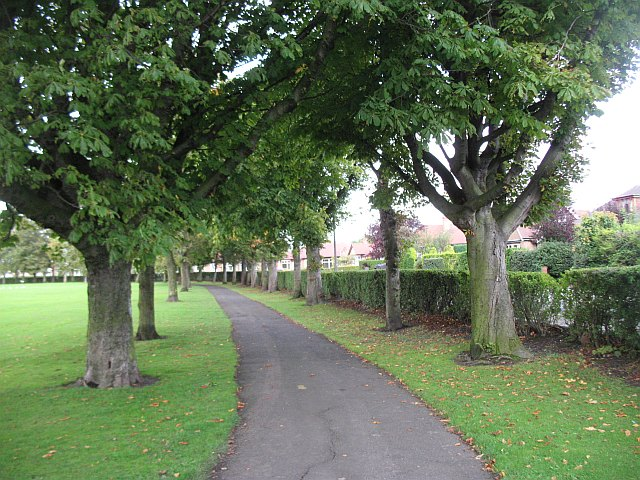
Zetland Park, off Abbotsgrange Road

A number of parks exist in the town which are used for sports and recreational activities. Inchyra Park, which is situated close to the stadium, Rannoch Park in the Bowhouse area which is situated at the point where the Grange Burn flows into the town, and Zetland Park in the centre of the town. Grangemouth Golf Club is actually located in the neighbouring village of Polmont.

=== Football ===
The town has many amateur football teams, including Zetland AFC and Bowhouse F.C.

Falkirk Juniors, who were established in 2011, played their home fixtures at the Grangemouth Stadium before folding in 2016. They competed in the Scottish Junior Football Association, East Region.

=== Religion ===
Many churches are located in Grangemouth: three Church of Scotland, two Catholic Churches, one Episcopal Church and several mission-type churches including a Kingdom Hall of Jehovah's Witnesses. The nearest Mosque is Falkirk Islamic Centre.

=== Attractions ===
The Kelpies and The Helix both stand between Grangemouth and Falkirk.

== Twin town ==
Grangemouth is twinned with:

- La Porte, Indiana, United States.

== Burials ==
Grangemouth Cemetery, officially called Grandsable Cemetery lies south of the town, closer to Polmont.

== Provosts of Grangemouth ==
- Charles Manson from 1917 to 1926.
- George Hearns from 1968 to 1971

== Notable people ==
- Kaye Adams (born 1962), TV presenter
- Robert Black (1947–2016), convicted serial killer, kidnapper and rapist
- Alan Davie (1920–2014), artist and musician
- Elizabeth Fraser (born 1963), vocalist, formerly of Cocteau Twins
- Steve Frew (born 1973), Scottish gymnast
- Robin Guthrie (born 1962), guitarist and music producer, formerly of Cocteau Twins
- Stuart Kennedy (born 1953), footballer for Falkirk, Aberdeen and Scotland
- Stuart Munro (born 1962), footballer for Rangers
- Sir John Ronald Peddie (1887–1979), linked to the Carnegie Trust
- Professor Gillian Reid (born 1964), President of the Royal Society of Chemistry.
- Isla St Clair (born 1952), singer, actress
- George Young (1922–1997), footballer, postwar captain of Rangers and Scotland

== See also ==
- List of places in Falkirk council area
