= Bellsdyke Hospital =

Former psychiatric hospital at Larbert, Falkirk from 1869 to 1997

- NHS Forth Valley
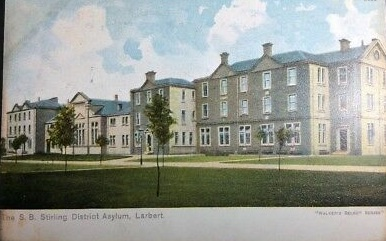
- Stirling District Asylum (latterly known as Bellsdyke Hospital)

- Shown in Falkirk

Geography
- Location: Larbert, Scotland
- Coordinates: 56.0352°N 3.8205°W

Organisation
- Care system: NHS Scotland
- Type: Specialist

Services
- Speciality: Psychiatric hospital

History
- Founded: June 1869
- Closed: 1997

Bellsdyke Hospital, also known as Stirling District Lunatic Asylum (SDLA) or Stirling District Asylum, is a former psychiatric hospital at Larbert, Falkirk council area, that was opened in June 1869 and largely closed in 1997. It was an asylum set up by the Stirling District Lunacy Board.

== History ==
=== Early history ===
Stirling District Lunacy Board formed in 1848: those on the board began to make plans to build another building to cope with the large number of inmates in the asylums in Stirlingshire and the counties that surround it. The Falkirk Poorhouse, which had been built in 1850, was unable to cope with the number of inmates it held, which had led to overcrowding and this, in turn, led to the decision of a new asylum being built.

The Lunacy (Scotland) Act 1857 required district asylums to be built and maintained by the authorities of the county, £25 per year was paid by the parish council for every patient sent by the parish to the asylum. The friends and relatives of the inmates often contributed to the costs of the stay in the asylum. However, even those from respectable homes were referred to as "pauper lunatics" due to their dependency on the state-run asylums.

The sum of £40,000 was set aside for the asylum, and the architect for the building was William Stirling III, whose previous works are also in the Falkirk area. The building was to be built on the Gowkhill Estate, with it being a mere coincidence that the old Scots word gowk means cuckoo. The estate was bought from Lieutenant-Colonel Thomas Dundas of Carron Hall, son of Thomas Dundas. The asylum would be adjacent to the newly opened Scottish Imbecile Institution, or as it was latterly known the Royal Scottish National Hospital.

During the building of the asylum, there were issues that delayed the asylum opening mainly due to problems with the water and gas on the site. William Stirling III never saw his work completed, as he died in February 1869, James Brown completed the building of the asylum and it was opened as the Stirling District Lunatic Asylum (usually known as Larbert Asylum) in June 1869. The asylum consisted of two large buildings that consisted of a chapel, male and female dormitories and a dining-room. The asylum was meant to house two hundred and fifty inmates, but issues with overcrowding meant that there were several additions to the original buildings. The inmates came from the counties of Clackmannan, Dumbarton, Stirlingshire and Linlithgow. The first superintendent of the asylum was Dr Frederick Skae of Morningside.

During the first few years of the asylum being open, it was mentioned in a debate in the House of Commons as an example of how an efficient asylum should be run. This reputation was due to the change in treatment that was happening at this point in history, which the SDLA implemented.

=== 1876–1883 ===
Dr James McLaren was appointed as superintendent in 1876; he continued to promote understanding of the inmate as a treatment rather than the use of force. The SDLA had no walled exercise as of 1879, when the female walled exercise court was turned into a drying green and the inmates enjoyed regular dances and concerts with those that were able working in the garden, laundry and farm on the asylums grounds. Physical activity was seen as a benefit to the inmates and many inmates helped at the laundry, gardens, and in the kitchens.

The Succursal block was built in 1882; the extra room was for convalescents with a limited number of places available for private patients who paid a fee for their place.

Dr MacLaren was the first to introduce a fully trained nurse to the SDLA in 1882.

=== 1889–1898 ===
Dr John Macpherson was appointed as superintendent in 1889; he disapproved of the inmates being thought of as state prisoners and began to push for the inmates to be referred to and be treated as a patient instead. Macpherson pushed for patients to have intensive medical treatment as they would at a hospital, which led to the expansion of the Chronic block that changed the shape of the original asylum. In 1891, it was noted that the works of the Falkirk and Larbert Water District had led to the Board to decide to update the plumbing of the SDLA, this was a favourable measure as previously there had not been enough water for the sanitary needs of the asylum. Toilets, bathrooms and water closets were all renovated or new ones installed, so that used water and sewage were not being pumped into the nearby stream. Instead, the used water and sewage were chemically treated and then filtered in sewage tanks. The old administrative section of the asylum was repurposed into a General Store, and a new administrative block was built. A new dairy and laundry were also built as the previous buildings were too small.

In 1892, the cost of a patient's admission went from £27 10s to £25, a bakery was added to the asylum which had the capability of producing 1000 loaves a day and the dining halls, in the main building, were extended to allow for the patients to all eat with one another.

Upon the day of the Chronic block opening on 26 July 1893, Dr Macpherson said in his speech that the SDLA was the first institution in the world that had adopted this attitude. Two English asylums were about to take on the same practices as the SDLA by 1894.

The Chronic block was built for acute cases. Also, kitchens were added, and a telephone system was installed throughout the asylum. Dr Macpherson's treatment focused on soothing colours, pleasant surroundings, and a dignified attitude towards clothing and hygiene helped towards the progress of the patients. Eighty patients were housed in the new block on 14 August 1893; however, nine months later the asylum was close to being at capacity once more. Renovation work was needed in parts of the hospital and patients had worked to create some of the roads around the asylum, and also a new cricket ground was made.

Overcrowding was still an issue, and a further extension was added to the Chronic block so that another one hundred and ninety patients could be housed. An officer was appointed to locate suitable outside boarding for those that were more tractable cases.

=== 1904–1933 ===
Dr George Robertson was appointed superintendent, he was an important figure in the field of mental health and brought the asylum closer to becoming a hospital. Robertson increased the practice of having fully trained nurses on the site that had previously been started by Dr McLaren. Dr Robertson did find it difficult to recruit young Victorian ladies into the nursing profession as it was not viewed as a respectable, to counter this view Dr Robertson provided the same extensive training that was applied to other branches of the medical profession. The structure of how the asylum was run changed when the appointment of a matron and six assistant matrons took place in 1905.

By 1906, nurses were required to train on a three-year course to gain a "Certificate for Proficiency in Mental Nursing". A sanatorium for males and a separate for females opened on 21 February 1906; the wards had their windows constantly opened to allow fresh air to circulate around the patients with consumption. After selling Kersebrock farm due to how far it was from the asylum, new land was purchased on South Inches farm which ran along the south-west border of the asylum.

In 1907, a new block was opened to house the large numbers of female nursing staff; the SDLA now had three blocks; the hospital block, the block for those that could do light work and the block for the "feeble and senile". There were over seven hundred patients by 1914, and the problem of overcrowding was an issue again as there were more cases requiring treatment than the admission rates allowed for. In 1915, a new block was built to house more patients.

In August 1908, Dr Robert Campbell took over the position as superintendent of the asylum. The patients regularly worked in the garden; the gardens were often expanded to allow for more of the patients to get involved, and more farmland was being sought by 1909 to allow for more patients to help on the farm also. The Asylum Officers' Superannuation Act 1909, was operational as of 15 May 1910. This act allowed those that were asylum officials and servants to retire at the age of 55 or 60 as long as they paid in weekly to the fund.

In 1911, the burgh of Falkirk proposed to extend its borders their proposal meant that the asylum would go from being in Stirling district to Falkirk district. The Board for the Asylum did not want this to happen as the taxes for the asylum would rise if they were to be incorporated into the Falkirk district. The greenhouses were replaced in 1911 and fire alarms were fitted throughout the asylum, the new piggery was also completed. The patients also performed in a concert, and theatrical performance was held in the winter of 1911.

In 1912, the burgh of Falkirk petitioned for the SDLA to be included in their burgh, but again they were denied. The profits from the Asylum shop were used to purchase a large magic lantern and cinematograph; this allowed the patients to have frequent cinematograph displays. As it was the Coronation year of George the Fifth, a special dinner was held on the day of the coronation for the patients, and the staff were all given one day off to go on a paid outing to Rothesay.

The First World War depleted the number of staff as many went off to fight, they were either replaced by inexperienced staff or were not replaced at all. The SDLA temporarily became a Naval War Hospital in 1918, with over 800 patients being moved to other asylums while the SDLA became a hospital. The patients of the SDLA were then returned in 1919 when its use as a temporary Naval War Hospital ended. Patients from the war were admitted to the SDLA well into the 1920s to deal with the trauma of what they had experienced.

In the 1930s, the Stirling District Mental Hospital Joint Committee took over the jurisdiction of Larbert and with it the SDLA. The implementation of electrical and hot baths treatment was put in place as was occupational therapy. The priority, however, was still to allow those that could work to lend a hand at the many farms of the SDLA.

=== 1939–1959 ===
Dr Spence was the superintendent during the Second World War, and during this time 55% of the staff were called up to go to war; however, Dr Spence was praised for operating the SDLA efficiently with the reduction of staff. The 1940s was when open wards and non-observation dormitories were introduced to the asylum. The asylum was transferred to the care of the NHS in 1948. Wooden huts were built alongside the Bellsdyke Road to allow for more patients and, these only began to be replaced in the 1960s.

=== 1959–1997 ===
The Mental Health (Scotland) Act 1960 saw the patients being re-classified as informal, the admission rate fell and instead there was a large number of patients voluntarily admitting themselves. The subject of mental health became less of a taboo subject and, the SDLA was re-classed as a hospital and, the name changed to Bellsdyke Hospital.

Nurse training increased as did the training of health visitors so that after-care treatment was improved. In April 1964, Cunningham House was opened, which was a new male psycho-neurotic block. Six new villas opened, Kinnaird and Stenhouse in 1967, Glenbervie, Dunmore, Carronhall and Torwood in 1968, they took over from the Succursal block as the villas allowed for a more personal treatment.

Although some services remained on site, the hospital effectively closed in 1997. Most of the buildings were demolished in the early 2000s.

== The Passing Hour ==
The Passing Hour was a magazine and chronicle of the SDLA in Larbert; the first issue was published in January 1901, and the final issue was published in 1917. The magazine was published every two months, with volumes containing poetry, correspondences, photographs of the SDLA patients and photographs from other asylums as well as short stories.
