= Forth Valley Royal Hospital =

Forth Valley Royal
- NHS Forth Valley
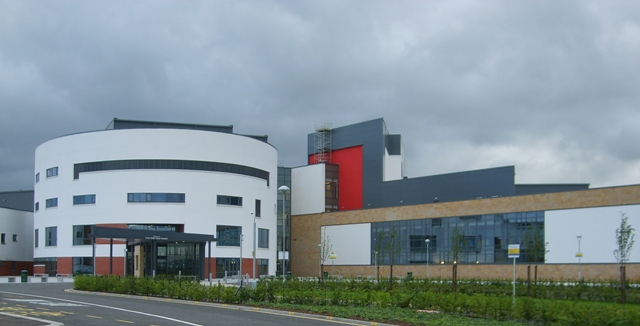
- Front entrance

- Location within Falkirk

Geography
- Location: Stirling Road, Larbert, Falkirk, Scotland
- Coordinates: 56.0254°N 3.8480°W

Organisation
- Care system: NHS Scotland
- Type: General

Services
- Emergency department: Yes
- Beds: 860

History
- Founded: 2010

Links
- Website: nhsforthvalley.com/hospitals/forth-valley-royal-hospital/
- Lists: Hospitals in Scotland

Forth Valley Royal Hospital is a hospital located in Larbert, Scotland. With 860 inpatient beds, 25 wards, and 16 operating theatres, it was Scotland's largest ever NHS construction project at the time but has been surpassed by the Queen Elizabeth University Hospital amongst others. Built at a cost of £300 million on the site of the old Royal Scottish National Hospital, it opened to its first patients in 2010. It is operated by NHS Forth Valley.

The hospital is the first in Scotland to have a Forestry Commission ranger on site, whose job is to encourage the use of the 70-acre (28 ha) grounds formerly belonging to the Larbert House estate. It has Scotland's first fully robotic pharmacy, in which robots dispense and label medicines. The hospital also employs robots to carry out tasks such as removing waste, delivering food to wards, and cleaning operating theatres.

== Background ==
The Forth Valley Royal Hospital was designed by Equion, a subsidiary of Laing O'Rourke, and Keppie Designs in cooperation with builders Laing O'Rourke. After a consultation process in 2003, involving 5,600 local residents, it was decided that a new acute hospital should be built to replace the ageing facilities at Stirling Royal Infirmary and Falkirk Royal Infirmary, which were to become community hospitals.

At the time of construction the hospital was Scotland's largest ever NHS construction project, cost £300 million to build, most of which was provided by a private finance initiative arrangement; it was built on the site of the old Royal Scottish National Hospital. Originally to be called Forth Valley Hospital, it was granted royal status by Queen Elizabeth II, becoming Forth Valley Royal Hospital. It was hoped the new hospital would be ready by 2009, but medical services did not start to be transferred until August 2010, when the first patients were admitted. The process was completed in June 2011, and the Queen officially opened the hospital on 6 July 2011.

== Facilities ==
Set in 70 acres (28 ha) of woodland, the hospital has 860 inpatient beds spread over four floors, 25 wards and 16 operating theatres. The wards contain a mixture of single rooms or a maximum of four beds per ward section, and each bed has access to a personal television screen free of charge. The hospital contains the region's only Accident and Emergency Department following the closure of the unit at Stirling Royal.

The hospital provides services for the 300,000 residents of the Forth Valley area, stretching from Killin in the north to Bo'ness in the south. Those services include:

- Cardiology
- Dermatology
- Diabetics
- Dietetics
- Ear, Nose and Throat
- Gynaecology and Maternity
- Mental Health
- Neurology
- Oral and Maxillofacial Surgery
- Orthopaedics
- Orthothotics
- Paediatrics
- Physiotherapy
- Respiratory
- Resuscitation Training
- Rheumatology
- Urology
- Wound Management

For the use of staff, patients, and visitors the hospital has several catering establishments including Starbucks, a Marks & Spencer Simply Food shop and cafe, and a full restaurant open seven days a week.

The hospital's design was criticised for not providing space for the storage of medical files. It was expected that all files would be stored electronically within five years. In the meantime, the paper medical files were transferred to the site of the old Falkirk Royal Infirmary. An old X-ray department at the hospital was decontaminated and converted into a storage department at a cost of £40,000, and a taxi company was contracted to move the records between sites.

== Radio Royal ==
Radio Royal is the hospital radio service for the Forth Valley, broadcasting from studios at the Forth Valley Royal Hospital. It operates three radio stations - Radio Royal, Royal 2 and Royal Gold - all 24 hours a day seven days a week, staffed by a team of around 40 volunteers. Founded in 1976, it originally broadcast from the old Royal Scottish National Hospital in Larbert. It was latterly based at Falkirk Royal Infirmary, before returning to Larbert on the opening of Forth Valley Royal.

== Famous Deaths ==
- Jonathan Gavin, was a world-class Scottish Judoka and 6th Dan Judo master who passed away at Forth Valley Royal Hospital on 5 February 2013 at the age of 46 after battling a rare Brain Tumour.
- Alan Longmuir passed away at the age of 70 on 2 July 2018 at Forth Valley Royal Hospital in Larbert, Scotland. As the founding bassist of the Bay City Rollers, his death marked the loss of a Scottish pop icon.
- Robbie Coltrane Scottish actor died at Forth Valley Royal Hospital in Larbert, Scotland, on 14 October 2022 at the age of 72. He had been in declining health and spent his final days under specialized care at the facility.

== Grounds ==
The hospital is set in the grounds of the Old Larbert House estate, which until 2002 housed the Royal Scottish National Hospital, a state mental hospital. The 70 acres of land contain a loch, walled garden and woodland areas. The grounds were transformed into a "green oasis" for the use of those using the hospital and the local community with the help of a £101,000 grant from the Forestry Commission Scotland. Forth Valley Royal is the first hospital in Scotland to have a Forestry Commission ranger on site.

Tunnels were discovered during the hospital's construction, thought to have been built to allow wealthy guests staying at Larbert House, built in 1822, to walk to the nearby loch unobserved.

== Transport ==
The hospital is accessible by public transport via bus services operating from the main local towns. A shuttle bus used to but no longer runs every 20 minutes from Larbert railway station, (it was free for passengers with a train ticket); the hospital is thus now a 25-minute walk away from Larbert train station.

A large car park with 1,500 spaces is provided, free with a maximum stay of four hours. Bicycle racks are provided for those cycling to the hospital.

== Robotics ==
Forth Valley Royal was the first hospital in the UK to use a system of robotic porters. A fleet of 13 robotic vehicles operates within the hospital, supplied and maintained by services company Serco, part of its 30-year contract to provide cleaning, catering, portering and maintenance services. The robots have their own corridor system and lifts underneath the hospital, and navigate using guidance lasers. They can be called up to wards by staff using a portable computer, and are used for tasks such as removing waste, delivering food to wards, and cleaning operating theatres. To avoid any risk of cross-contamination the fleet is divided into those robots performing "clean" tasks and those carrying out "dirty" tasks, each with their own network of corridors.

The hospital also has Scotland's first fully robotic pharmacy, where robots dispense and label medicines. It is estimated that in reducing the number of errors and requiring less staff time the system, which cost £400,000 to install, has cut the hospital's drug bill by £700,000. Instead of completing prescription forms, staff on the wards order drugs via computer terminals.
