= Bo'ness Hospital =

- NHS Forth Valley
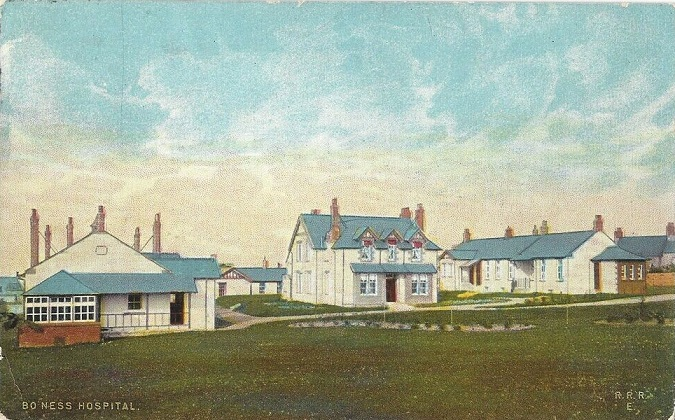
- Original buildings, Bo'ness Hospital

- Location within Falkirk

Geography
- Location: Dean Road, Bo'ness, Scotland
- Coordinates: 56.0115°N 3.6139°W

Organisation
- Care system: NHS Scotland
- Type: Specialist

Services
- Emergency department: No
- Speciality: Mental health

History
- Founded: 1910

Links
- Lists: Hospitals in Scotland

Bo'ness Hospital is a community hospital in Dean Road, Bo'ness, Scotland. It is managed by NHS Forth Valley.

== History ==
The facility was established as an infectious diseases hospital in 1910. It joined the National Health Service in 1948. A red brick health centre was built on the site in the 1970s. A modern community hospital, intended to provide psychiatry and services for elderly patients, was designed by Robert Paul and opened in 2004.
