= Grangemouth Municipal Buildings =

Judicial building in Grangemouth, Scotland

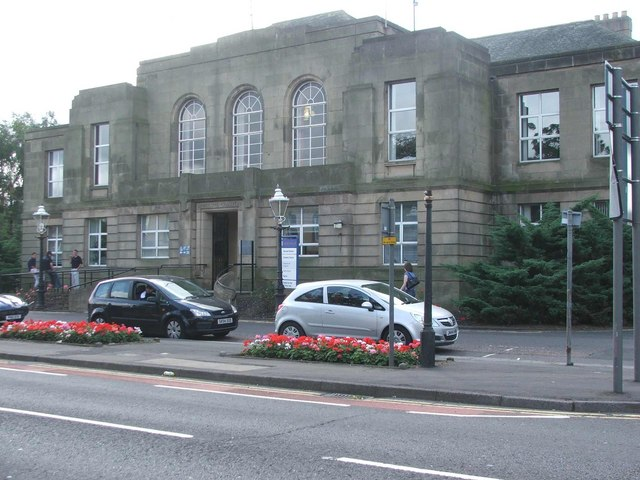
- The building in 2007

- Shown in Falkirk council area
- 56.0190°N 3.7213°W
- Location: Bo'ness Road, Grangemouth

History
- Built: 1937

Site notes
- Architect(s): Robert Wilson and David Tait
- Architectural style: Italianate style

Grangemouth Municipal Buildings, also known as Grangemouth Municipal Chambers, is a municipal structure in Bo'ness Road, Grangemouth, Scotland. The structure was the headquarters of Grangemouth Burgh Council.

== History ==
After the Grangemouth area was advanced to the status of small burgh in 1930, civic leaders, who had previously met in Grangemouth Town Hall, decided to commission dedicated municipal buildings for the council, while allowing the town hall to operate as an events venue. The site they selected was open land on the opposite side of the road to the town hall.

The new building was designed by Robert Wilson and David Tait in the Italianate style, built in ashlar stone and was officially opened on 30 October 1937. The design involved a symmetrical main frontage of nine bays facing onto Bo’ness Road. The central section of three bays, which was projected forward, featured a square-headed doorway, flanked by a pair of casement windows, which supported a balcony. There were three round headed windows facing out onto the balcony on the first floor. The bays flanking the central section, which were also projected forward, and the wings, of two bays each, were fenestrated by casement windows. At roof level, the central section was surmounted by a parapet and the bays flanking the central section were castellated. Internally, the principal room was the council chamber.

The glazier, Daneil O'May, was commissioned to design a stained-glass window for the staircase in the building. The window incorporated the coat of arms of the burgh which featured a depiction of the steamboat, Charlotte Dundas, which was built by shipbuilders, Alexander Hart, at Grangemouth, as well as depictions of the sailing ship, Lakeside and the motor ship, Eildon.

King George VI, accompanied by Queen Elizabeth, visited the municipal buildings in June 1946, and Queen Elizabeth II, accompanied by the Duke of Edinburgh, met with civic leaders at the municipal buildings in July 1955. The building ceased to be the local seat of government after Falkirk District Council was established in 1975. However, it continued to be used for the delivery of local services, and to accommodate the council's employment and training unit.
