= Carronvale House =

Country house in Stirlingshire, Scotland

Coordinates: 56.0173°N 3.8188°W

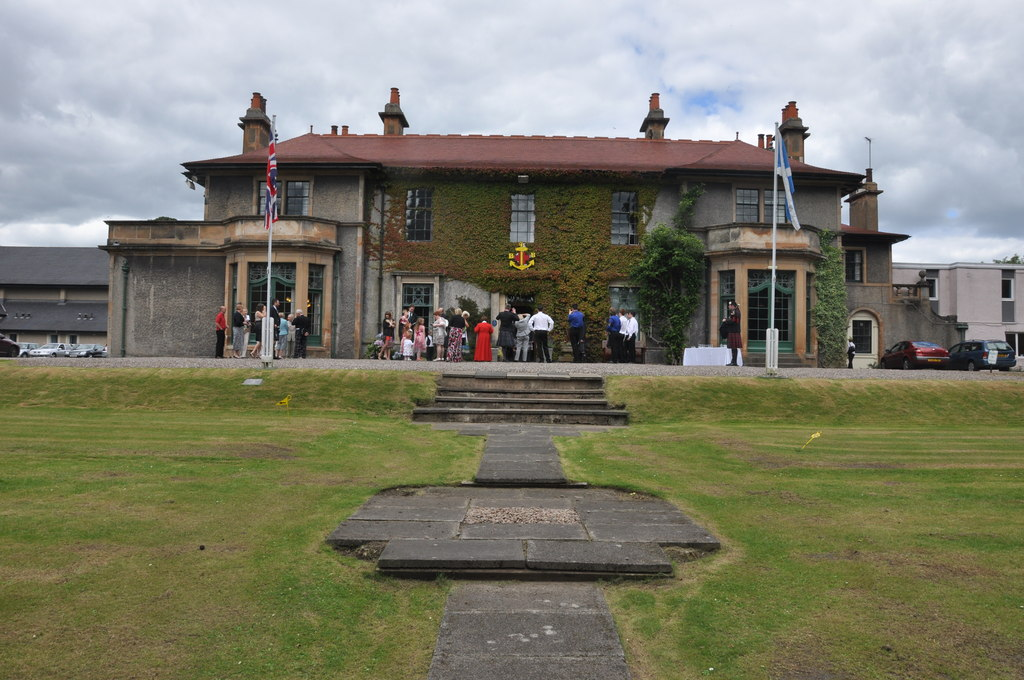

Carronvale House is a category A listed country house in Larbert, Stirlingshire, Scotland. It is a large two-storey house with neo-Georgian details. Its outer walls date from the 18th century, with two new wings added in the 1820s, and it was extensively remodelled in 1897 by architect Sir John Burnet.

It is home to the Boys' Brigade Scottish Headquarters, and is used as a training, conference and activity centre. The house is also utilised by health & local authorities, churches, charities, hospices, schools, other youth organisations and private groups.

== History ==
The name was originally Broomage or Brumeinche, meaning broom meadow or links. In 1452, King James II gave the lands to James Rutherford for faithful service. In 1476 they belonged to James, Lord Livingston, who had probably bought them. A century later they were sold to John, Lord Thirlestane. In 1644, they passed to John Burne, The land was sold in 1715 by Lodovick Callander (alias Willison of Dorrator) to Alex Brown. Mr Duncan Robertson of Roehill, Perthshire, bought the estate in 1819.

From this time the name of Carronvale was adopted. Dr Robertson planted trees, laid out a new drive and built a lodge. He also added two wings to the old house and lined the rooms with mahogany grown on his Jamaican estate. He died in 1824, leaving Carronvale to his eldest son, also Duncan, who had a commission in the Indian Army, where he met his future wife Miss Ogilvie, niece of the then Earl of Airlie. On the death of Duncan Robertson (the second) in 1856, the estate was sold to John Bell Sherriff. Upon his death in 1896, his son George inherited the estate and made extensive alterations to the house, but preserved the original structure. When George Sherriff died in 1908, one of his sons, Alick, inherited Carronvale.

During the First World War, officers of the 8th Scottish Rifles were billeted in the stables of the estate. During the Second World War the house was used for record storage by the Prudential Insurance Company.

It was sold to the Boys' Brigade in 1945 and it was officially opened for training on 14 June 1947 by Lord Home, the then Brigade President. It has been in constant use ever since as the National Training Centre for Scotland, with many Officers, Leaders and Boys attending courses and conferences annually. Lord Steel MSP opened the Recreation Centre on 6 May 2000. After the roof was refurbished in 2003 and ensuite facilities added to most of the bedrooms, a service of rededication was held in April 2004.
