= Grangemouth Town Hall =

Municipal building in Grangemouth, Scotland

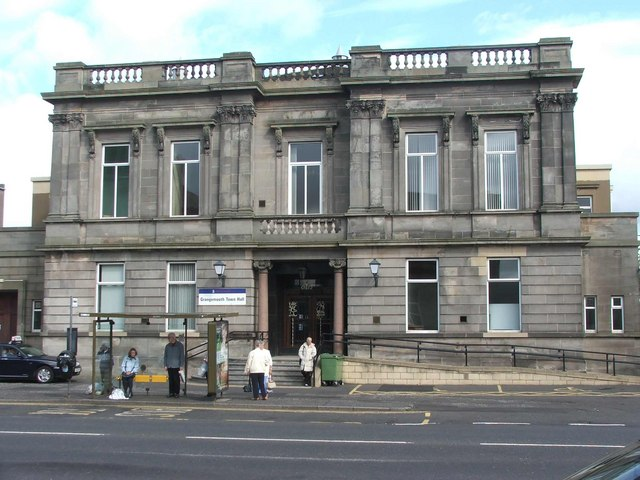
- Grangemouth Town Hall

- Shown in Falkirk council area
- 56.0197°N 3.7214°W
- Location: Bo'ness Road, Grangemouth

History
- Built: 1885

Site notes
- Architect: William Black
- Architectural style: Neoclassical style

Grangemouth Town Hall is a municipal structure in Bo'ness Road, Grangemouth, Scotland. The structure was the meeting place of Grangemouth Burgh Council until 1937 and remains the main events venue in the area.

== History ==
After Grangemouth became a police burgh in 1872, the burgh commissioners decided to procure a new civic building for the town: the site they chose for the town hall was open land which they acquired from the Caledonian Railway Company. A design competition was arranged and won by William Black whose design for a town hall in Newmarket Street in Falkirk had already been successfully executed. The Grangemouth building was designed in the neoclassical style, built in ashlar stone and was completed in 1885.

The design involved a symmetrical main frontage with five bays facing onto Bo'ness Road; the central bay, which was recessed, featured a flight of steps leading up to a doorway which was flanked by Ionic order columns supporting a entablature and a balustrade, behind which, on the first floor, there was a balcony and a French door. The side sections, which were enhanced by pairs of Ionic order pilasters on the first floor, were fenestrated by casement windows with brackets supporting canopies and, at roof level, there was a cornice and a balustrade. Internally, the principal room was the main assembly hall.

Black was also responsible for the design of the public library on the opposite side of the road which was financed by the Scottish-American industrialist and philanthropist, Andrew Carnegie: Carnegie travelled to the town hall from Glasgow to conduct the opening ceremony of the library personally on 31 January 1889. After the area was advanced to the status of small burgh in 1930, the council and their officers sought dedicated premises, and relocated to new municipal buildings on the opposite side of the road in 1937. The town hall continued to be used as an events venue and performers included the rock band, The Beatles, in 1960, the rock band, Them, led by Van Morrison, in 1964 and the new wave band, Ultravox, in 1978.

In 2011, the council started to look for a developer to support the regeneration of the complex.
