= William Wotherspoon Ireland =

Scottish physician

- Born: 27 October 1832; Edinburgh
- Died: 17 May 1909 (aged 76)
- Occupation: Physician

William Wotherspoon Ireland (27 October 1832 – 17 May 1909) was a Scottish physician. After serving as a physician in the East India Company, he became an expert in intellectual disabilities and medico-psychology. His book On Idiocy and Imbecility (late renamed Mental Affections of Children) is concerned to be the first substantial textbook about intellectual disabilities.

== Early life and education ==
William Wotherspoon Ireland was born in Edinburgh on 27 October 1832. His father was Thomas Ireland, a publisher. His mother was Mary Wotherspoon, whose father was a writer to the signet and the first manager and secretary of the Scottish Widows Life Assurance Society. Through his father, Ireland was a descendant of John Knox.

He studied medicine at the University of Edinburgh and also in Paris, graduating in 1855. In 1905, to celebrate the 50th anniversary of his graduation, he was presented with a jubilee gift from his friends and an illuminated address by Thomas Clouston.

== Career ==
Ireland began working as an assistant surgeon with the Bengal Horse Artillery of the East India Company shortly before the Indian Rebellion of 1857. He participated in the Battle of Badli-ki-Serai and the Battle of Najafgarh. During the Siege of Delhi, he treated the wounds of Frederick Roberts, 1st Earl Roberts. Ireland was shot in the head eight months into his service: the bullet entered through his eye, destroying it entirely, exited behind his ear. He was blind in this eye for the rest of his life. He was also shot in the shoulder, the bullet becoming lodged in his back. It was originally wrongly reported that he had been killed.

The injuries qualified Ireland for an enhanced pension and prevented him from working for ten years. During this period, he lived in Madeira and throughout Europe, and he wrote three books: History of the Siege of Delhi, Studies of a Wandering Observer and Randolph Methyl.

From 1869 to 1879, Ireland was Medical Superintendent of the Larbert Institution for Imbecile Children. His superintendency emphasised the importance of education, which faced opposition from the institution's board of directors who favoured a custodial approach to care. It was this disagreement with the board of directors that led Ireland to resign from his position. Following this, he established three private schools in Stirling, Prestonpans and Polton respectively. He also worked as the medical officer at Miss Murray's Institution for Girls in Prestonpans.

Ireland was a prolific writer. In 1877, he published Idiocy and Imbecility, which was republished in 1900 with the title Mental Affections of Children. It has been theorised that this book may contain the earliest depiction of a person with Fragile-X Syndrome. In Blot on the Brain and Through the Ivory Gate, Ireland considered biological inheritance by examining significant historical figures. Having knowledge of French, German, Italian Spanish, Norse and Hindustani, he also translated articles for publications including the Journal of Mental Science.

He was a member of the Psychiatric Society of St. Petersburg, the New York Medico-Legal Society and the Società Freniatrica Italiana.

== Personal life and death ==
In 1861, Ireland married Margaret Patterson. They had one son (Thomas Ireland, a doctor with the West India Medical Services) and one daughter.

On 17 May 1909, Ireland died in his home Victoria Terrace in Musselburgh.
