= NHS Forth Valley =

Healthcare board based in Stirling, Scotland

- Type: NHS board
- Established: 2004
- Headquarters: Castle Business Park; Stirling; FK9 4SW
- Region served: Clackmannanshire; Falkirk; Stirling
- Hospitals: Bellsdyke Hospital; Bo'ness Hospital; Falkirk Community Hospital; Forth Valley Royal Hospital; Stirling Health and Care Village
- Staff: 5,419 (2018/19)
- Website: www.nhsforthvalley.com

NHS Forth Valley is one of the fourteen regions of NHS Scotland. It provides healthcare services in the Clackmannanshire, Falkirk and Stirling area. NHS Forth Valley is headquartered in Castle Business Park, Stirling.

== Hospitals ==
NHS Forth Valley is one of 14 regional health boards and serves a population of around 306,000 in a diverse geographical area which covers the heart of Scotland. The Health Board controls an annual budget of £570 million, and employs around 8000 staff. Forth Valley Royal Hospital in Larbert is supported by a network of four community facilities, 57 health centres, day centres providing care and support for patients with mental illness and learning disabilities and a wide range of community based services.

=== Forth Valley ===
Clackmannanshire, Falkirk and Stirling

==== Falkirk ====
- Falkirk Community Hospital

===== Outwith Falkirk =====
- Bellsdyke Hospital, Larbert
- Bo'ness Hospital
- Forth Valley Royal Hospital, Larbert

==== Stirling ====
- Stirling Health and Care Village
