= Stirling Health and Care Village =

- NHS Forth Valley
- Shown in Stirling

Geography
- Location: Livilands Gate, Stirling, Scotland
- Coordinates: 56.1070°N 3.9357°W

Organisation
- Care system: NHS Scotland
- Type: General

Services
- Emergency department: No

History
- Founded: 1830

Links
- Lists: Hospitals in Scotland

Stirling Health and Care Village is a health and care facility at Livilands Gate in Stirling, Scotland. It is managed by NHS Forth Valley as well as Stirling and Clackmannanshire's HSCP. It was formerly known as Stirling Community Hospital.

== History ==
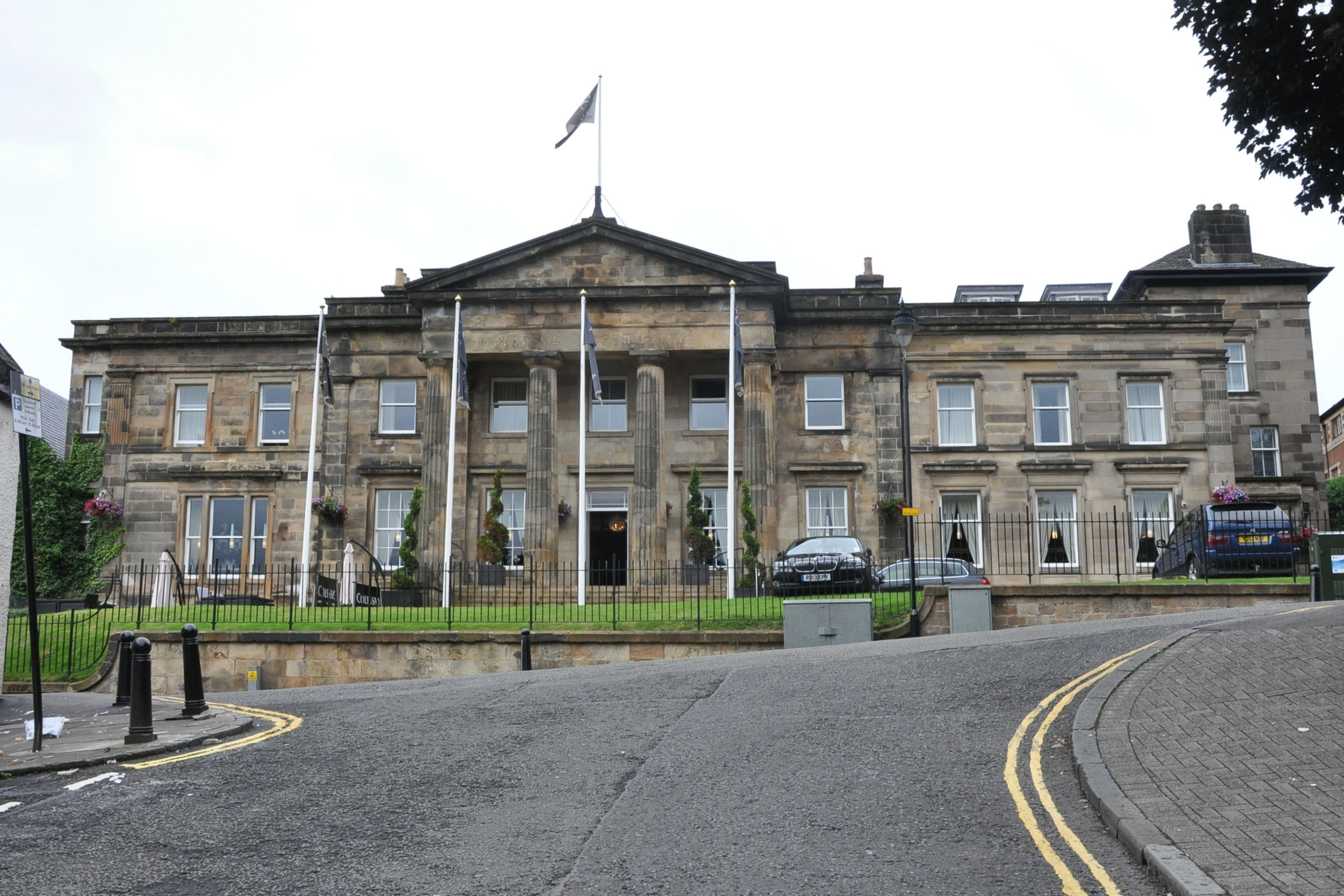
The old infirmary in Spittal Street

The facility had its origins in a public dispensary established in 1830. It moved to the former Commercial Bank building in Spittal Street as the Stirling Royal Infirmary in June 1874. A children's ward and a staff accommodation block were added in 1913.

A new purpose-built facility at Livilands Gate designed by James Miller (1860–1947) was built and officially opened by the Duke and Duchess of York in August 1928. Emergency medical scheme huts were built on the site during the Second World War. It joined the National Health Service in 1948 and subsequent additions included a chest unit and pharmacy in 1955 and a new maternity hospital in 1969.

After many of the services transferred to the Forth Valley Royal Hospital in 2010, the Stirling Royal Infirmary was downgraded to the status of a community hospital. The site has since been redeveloped as the Stirling Health and Care Village.
