= Royal Scottish National Hospital =

- Forth Valley Health Board
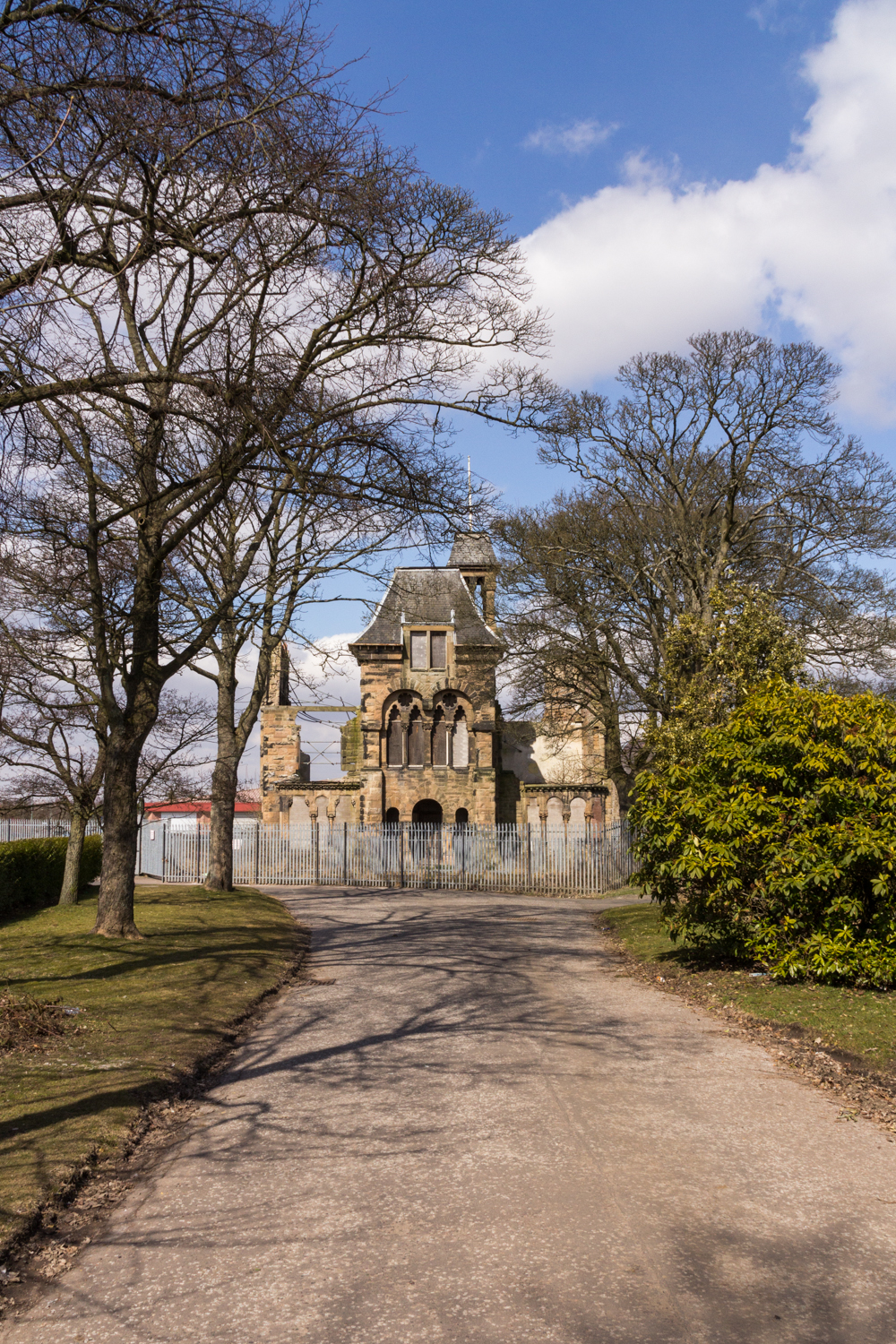
- Principal Block of the hospital

- Shown in Falkirk

Geography
- Location: Larbert, Scotland
- Coordinates: 56.0278°N 3.8456°W

Organisation
- Care system: NHS Scotland
- Type: Specialist

Services
- Speciality: Psychiatric hospital

History
- Founded: 23 May 1863
- Closed: 1991
- Demolished: 2015

The Royal Scottish National Hospital was a psychiatric institution situated in Larbert (today in Falkirk council area), Scotland. It was first founded as the Scottish National Institution for the Education of Imbecile Children in 1862, with the building being officially opened on 23 May 1863.

== History ==
=== The early history of the building ===
The building initially used for the institution was in Gayfield Square, Edinburgh in 1855 and administered by 'The Society for the Education of the Imbecile Youth of Scotland'. Dr. and Mrs. Brodie educated the children during the time in Edinburgh, however; the building was too small for all the pupils and staff which meant the committee had to look for another site for the institution. It was necessary to find bigger premises for the institution, five acres near Larbert railway station were obtained to build a property and this was founded as the 'Home for Imbecile and Invalid Children' in 1863. The architect for the original building was Frederick Thomas Pilkington, his own house Egremont was started after the building at Larbert was completed, both were the High Victorian Gothic revival style that Pilkington favoured. Pilkington travelled to England to look at the designs of leading institutions there, he drew up plans and estimated the cost of erecting the building to be £1,800. The funds for the building were partly raised by a Ladies' Auxiliary Committee in Edinburgh, who managed to raise £1,350 through mainly small donations.

The first part of the building opened in 1863, and there was an official opening ceremony on the 23 May with the building costing £1,969 in total. There was still an issue of space however and plans to extend the building were estimated at £2,000; the committee held a Bazaar in the Music Hall, Edinburgh to help raise funds for the extension. Dr. Brodie was appointed as the medical superintendent of the institution.

The importance of furnishing the institution to feel like a home for the children that would stay there, and also the focus on their education were the main priorities of the committee. The Constitution for the institution was confirmed by the committee in 1864, and the first election for the committee happened on 10 July 1863. Twenty-two children resided in the building by 1864, in January of that year, there had been a small fire in an outbuilding of the institution. By 1865 the institution was drawing up plans to double the sleeping quarters for the patients. Forty patients were staying at the institution by 1866, the extension plans had been drawn up and estimated at the cost of £10,000 which would allow for 200 patients to stay at the institution. Dr. Brodie resigned from the institution in 1867, Dr. Adam Addison took on the role of medical superintendent after having six years experience in the Royal Lunatic Asylum, Montrose.

The new buildings had started to be built in 1869, 59 pupils resided at the institution in this year. On 30 October 1869, Queen Victoria gave the institution a generous donation of £100; she continued to donate throughout her reign. The new buildings were completed in 1870, and this gave more room for the teaching of lessons. As well as lessons the patients were employed to learn skills with the boys being taught by the gardener, joiner and shoe-maker and the girls being taught by the domestic servants. The patients that were girls had also been taught needlework, knitting and fancy work, during the year of 1869-1870 they had managed to knit and sew handkerchiefs, shirts, pinafores, sheets, stockings and towels. Cricket and croquet were played during the summer months and dances were held during the winter months.

=== William Ireland ===
At the end of 1870, Dr. Addison resigned from his post and was replaced by William Wotherspoon Ireland. In 1872 there were 86 patients at the institute, a new cooker had to be fitted so that all the patients could be fed and a new drying green was installed for all the extra washing. The boys' studies in employable skills had been extended to include sack sewing, mat making and brush making and in the period of one year, the boys had managed to make 270 brushes, 30 doormats and 72 grain sacks. The need for a hospital building for the institute had become pressing after two epidemics had hit the institute over the last three years, the cost of construction was estimated at £1,600 of which funding for a large part of it had been acquired by 1873. A kitchen-garden had been opened in 1874 to provide the institute with more vegetables for their meals. Over two hundred patients had stayed in the institution by 1874; however, there was a limit to how long a patient could stay which was five years.

In 1875 the need for another extension had become apparent, the expansion would allow for a further 120 patients to live in the institution, the cost had been estimated at £12,000. By 1877 most of the new building had been completed, and patients had begun to live in the portion of the building that had been completed. The gymnasium and the rest of the new building were completed by 1878; patients families had been requesting to have accommodation to stay with younger patients during their time at the institution which the committee was to meet and discuss. By 1881 the grounds had been fenced, and new sewage pipes had been fitted.

=== Mr. Skene ===
Dr. Ireland resigned in 1882 and was replaced in the role by Mr. Alexander Skene, for medical knowledge Dr. Hamilton became the medical officer to work alongside Mr. Skene in the running of the institution. Mr. Skene worked to show the positive points of having patients working on a task where they could see the difference they were making, boys worked hard in the garden and fields if they were fit enough to do so and girls enjoyed helping in the garden as well as their knitting and needlework. Mr. Skene had all the day-rooms and dormitories freshly decorated to promote a cheerful environment for all the patients that lived in the institution. Mr. Skene received a commendation from the Commissioners of Lunacy in 1883, Dr. Hamilton died in 1882 and was replaced by Dr. Leslie.

In 1883 Mr. Skene continued to have the institution decorated so that the institution felt more home-like, this was achieved through mirrors, open fires in the fireplaces instead of the use of only heaters, statuettes, the number of toilets and bathrooms being increased and re-structuring the layout of the buildings to allow for another school room for the patients. By 1884 the number of patients at the institution was 178 and stayed around this number over the next few years. Mr. Skene required that part of the building be re-structured to allow for a shop to train the patients the importance of money and also practical skills. As well as dances that were held over the winter months, magic lantern shows were also provided for the patients by Colonel Nimmo. A new isolation building had to be provided to stop the spread of infectious diseases; this was finished in 1886. Mr. Skene pushed for a gate lodge to be built so that married male workers did not have to walk for miles to get to their place of work. It also meant that if there was a fire or an emergency the men were close by to help. The gate lodge was completed in 1868.

By 1890 the numbers of patients had risen to 194, by 1891 it had increased further to 204. Mr. Skene continued his improvements throughout the institution including a new conservatory for flowers throughout the rooms, new pipes for water and new pipelines for gas to improve the quantity to be received at the institution. The flow of water was significantly enhanced through the change to the Falkirk and Larbert Water Trust. A new laundry was fitted in 1892, with the old laundry being converted into classrooms and the previous classrooms being re-purposed as dormitories. In 1894 a licence was granted to the institution which allowed for 230 patients to be housed at the institution, in the same year 227 were living at the institution. The institution was connected to the sewage works in 1895; the superintendent was housed in a new building so that his apartment could be re-purposed to accommodate more patients. The number of patients had risen to 242, with one patient coming from Brazil and another from France, a telephone was connected to the institution, and the fruit and flower gardens were moved to make more room for a playground.

In 1899 patient numbers had risen to 274, this had made necessary many parts of the buildings to be re-structured to make room for the addition of more children this included extending the dining room. The patients that were admitted in 1899 were mostly Scottish; however, one patient arrived from China and another from South Africa. The institution benefited from the opening of a covered playground in 1900; this allowed patients to exercise no matter the weather outside. In 1901 a mortuary was erected on the grounds of the institution.

Mr. Skene continued to make changes to the institution and resigned as Superintendent after thirty years in the position in 1912, Dr. R. Clarkson took over the job. During Mr. Skene's time at the institution, the numbers of patients had gone from 124 to over 350; his focus had always been on the welfare of those residing in the institution.

=== The Royal Scottish National Institution ===
By 1913 the furniture in the school rooms was changed to suit the requirements of the class size, much consideration was given to the Mental Deficiency Bill and what would happen if it was passed. In 1914 the home was renamed the Scottish National Institution, Larbert, this was due to the original Mental Deficiency Act becoming law. A water tank was installed in 1914 in case of a fire; also the buildings that could be were roofed with lead and flat roofs were re-roofed in zinc. By 1915 the institution had over 400 patients residing inside it, this meant that many buildings were in need of extension, the most important of which was the sanatorium. World War I meant that the expansion of buildings was delayed due to the scarcity of materials and of men that could complete the work for the institution.

In 1917 the institution was granted the honour of using the suffix of Royal in its title by King George the V, it was now known as The Royal Scottish National Institution. In 1918 the institution was granted a licence that would allow 500 patients to become residents, new beds had to be provided as the numbers of patients had already risen to 468. The new Nurses home was completed in 1919; it housed eighty members of the nursing staff and this gave more room in other buildings to allow for the rise in patients to the institution. By 1920 the institution had 500 patients throughout the year which meant there had to be a serious consideration of how the institution would house more patients.

By 1922 the institution was the largest of its kind in Scotland and had a waiting list of over one hundred and twenty names. The buildings of the institution needed repairs and alterations and in 1922 William J. Gibson, O.B.E. submitted plans for the works that were to take place. The work began in August 1922 and continued until 1925, parts of the first building had to be reconstructed entirely as they were in such poor repair. The Duchess of Montrose visited the institution in 1925 and spoke positively of the work that was being achieved in Larbert.

In 1926 the Board were able to acquire Larbert House and Estate, this was prompted by a need to expand how many occupants could be treated at the hospital. Included in the sale was two farms that were leased for the next five years but once the leases were finished, they would be used to allow older students to learn the skills of labouring on a farm. The Scottish Council of Women Citizens' Associations gave £10,000 to go towards the colony being established on the grounds of Larbert Estate.

The boys' football team began in 1931 with the girls' hockey team being formed the next again year. In 1932, the five villas at the colony were completed, each villa held fifty patients each with Larbert House having thirty-six places available inside of it. Househill farm was converted into a dairy farm and the boys of the institution that could help work the land. This meant that much of the produce was grown by the Institute for those that lived at the institute, including potatoes, oatmeal, roots and green vegetables. In 1934 a poultry farm was added which allowed for fresh eggs for the institution; also a psychologist joined the staff at the institute.

Dr. Clarkson retired in 1935 after working at the institution since 1894; he was replaced by Dr. Thomas Spence. A wireless radio and speakers were wired up in the gymnasium in 1936, to allow for the children to listen to more music and dance if they wanted to. The numbers of patients at the institution had risen to over seven hundred by 1936. In 1936 a paddling pool was added beside the playground, six new swings and a see-saw were also added. In 1937 each child that was a patient at the institute was given a commemorative souvenir for the coronation of King George VI. In 1938, instead of the annual excursion of a seaside picnic, two hundred pupils went on a trip to the Empire Exhibition at Bellahouston. The Park which had previously been the superintendent's house was converted to house 30 private female patients; also a Girl Guides group (1st Torwood) was started in 1939.

=== The Institutions Ethos ===
The object of the institution was always to educate the patients in their care; education was not limited to the classroom but also included assisting the children to grow up with good behaviour and the skills to help themselves. By including training in employable skills the hope was that the children would gain enough experience to obtain employment when they left the institution, and where this may not be possible, then the aim was to teach the children to become useful at home, as much for themselves as well as for their family. Those in charge of the institution wanted the buildings to feel like a home, there was no uniform, and the children were formed into groups so that they could look out for one another.

The ethos of the Colony was similar to that of the institutes, the committee and staff had realised that there was an issue of educating patients until they were twenty-one, or until they were released to their parents upon request before their eighteenth. The patients still needed to be cared for but no place catered for the care that the ex-patients of the institute needed, that is when the idea of an industrial colony began.

=== The Colony ===
The committee for the institution and a few of the superintendents of the institution had previously voiced their concerns that only being able to look after the children was a small portion of what could be achieved. The adults that they sent out into the world sometimes struggled to get jobs after their care and education; the institution knew that those brought up in their walls could achieve more than what the community outside the institution was able to do. The idea of an industrial colony was a dream, the land that the institution had was too small to allow for a farm and bigger workshops, however when the sale for Larbert House and Estate came up for sale in 1926, the committee bought the Estate.

The industrial colony was estimated to cost around £70,000; this would be raised through public donations. Larbert House was repurposed so that 36 adults with mental health problems could live on the Estate; the committee looked to extend this through building villas on the land so that more patients could be housed. At first two villas were to be erected but this increased to five villas, due to the demand for places in the Colony. The villas were completed in 1932 which allowed for two hundred and fifty more patients to be housed, Househill farm on the Larbert Estate was converted into a dairy farm for the institution.

An appeal was made to the public to help fund the building of villas and ancillary premises, and due to the generous response, the Colony was able to open on 12 September 1935. The opening of the Colony expanded the institutes capacity to 750 patients. In 1936 privileges for the boys included passes which allowed them to leave the institution to go to football matches and the pictures, these were only available to those that were commended for their excellent behaviour. By 1937 the Colony was fully occupied, and two more villas were proposed to keep up with the demand for places, six more beds were added to Larbert House. By the autumn of 1937, the two new villas were completed which allowed for another one hundred patients to be housed at the institution. The Hostel for Colony attendants was finished in 1939, this housed twelve attendants and freed up beds in the villas for patients.

The Colony accepted a further one hundred patients in 1940 due to another institution having to evacuate their patients; this meant that the hospital had to be made into an eighth villa and day rooms were lost to house everyone. The Colony boys replanted the woods, in 1941, that had been felled at the outbreak of war.

=== Second World War ===
The outbreak of World War II meant that the plans to build seven villas for the institute to house the patients were put on hold, the villas were to be similar to the ones that currently stood at the Colony. The male staff at both the institution and the Colony were significantly reduced because of enlistment. Every window was blacked out, and the gardens were ploughed to allow for more produce to be planted, the pigs and lambs that once fed the patients and staff were no longer allowed to be killed for food for the institute and Colony.

By the end of 1940, over nine hundred patients were staying at the institute, the level of staff kept falling due to men being called up to enlist and nurses going to help in the war. The animals at the farm were raised to be killed, and the produce was taken away, none of the meat was given to the institute, by 1942 the oatmeal that was grown on the property was also taken to be used elsewhere. In the early 1940s the 4th Larbert, Boys' Brigade was started.

By the start of 1944, the Gogarburn Hospital evacuees had been returned which meant that the institute's numbers returned to under eight hundred, the staffing levels were elevated due to more staff being acquired. Dunipace House and Estate of around six hundred acres were purchased in 1946; this was to increase the size of farmland and also allow for more patients to be housed at the institute. In 1946, a proposed trunk road to run through both estates threatened how the Colony worked as adult patients could move animals and machinery between field unaided, if the trunk road were to go ahead it would cut off the best farmland from the Colony buildings.

In 1948, the National Health Service Scotland Act meant that the institution was taken over by the State The institute had run for 87 years and was handed over to the NHS on the 5th of July 1948, 1,400 acres and 850 patients against the 5 acres and 28 patients they had at the start.

=== The NHS ===
The Western Regional Board took over the care of the buildings and patients at the institute; more land was purchased so that more patients could be housed at the site. The target for patient numbers was 1,300 patients through the expansion of current buildings; this was to cost £1 million and be completed by 1959. The old villas once held only fifty patients, but this was to rise to between fifty-eight and sixty-two.

The Mental Health (Scotland) Act 1960 (8 & 9 Eliz. 2. c. 61) meant that the Mental Welfare Commission replaced the Board of Control. A large number of patients meant that there were inadequate numbers of toilets and washing facilities for all the patients, there was also too few staff to look after all the patients and keeping staff was difficult. Inj the early 1970s the institute changed to become a hospital, the ward numbers that had previously been used were altered to become the names of lochs and rivers at the Colony and island names for the site for the children.

The site was taken over by The Forth Valley Health Board in April 1974, and patient numbers remained around 1,300 into the 1980s. The general opinion had changed from taking care of those with mental health issues, instead of sending them away patients should be cared for in the community and by their own family. The original site of the institute was left without patients as they were settled elsewhere. A small part of the Colony site near to Larbert Cross was used for the Lochview development which was to take over from the Royal Scottish National Hospital. The last few patients left the original sites in 1991, with Lochview opening in September 1992, the five original villas and administrative block built in the Colony site were demolished a few months after Lochview was opened.
