= Falkirk Community Hospital =

- NHS Forth Valley
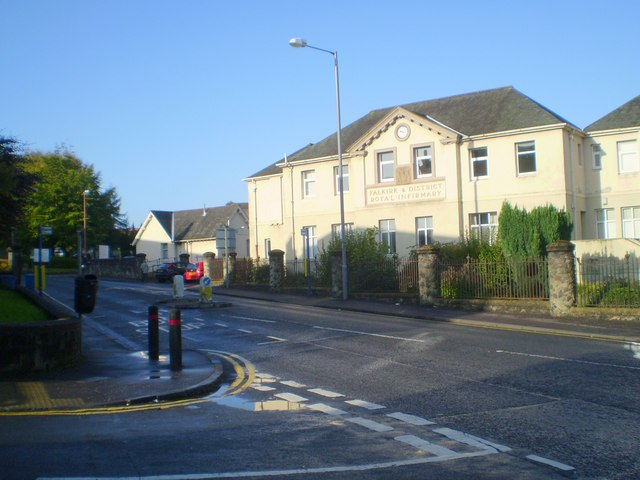
- Original building, Falkirk Royal Infirmary

- Location within Falkirk

Geography
- Location: Falkirk, Scotland
- Coordinates: 55.9977°N 3.7917°W

Organisation
- Care system: NHS Scotland
- Type: Public hospital

Services
- Emergency department: No

History
- Founded: 1882

Links
- Lists: Hospitals in Scotland

Falkirk Community Hospital is a community hospital in Falkirk, Scotland. It is managed by NHS Forth Valley.

== History ==
The hospital has its origins in a cottage hospital completed in 1882. A new hospital designed by William John Smith Gibson was built and opened by Prince George, Duke of Kent as the Falkirk Royal Infirmary in 1932. Emergency medical scheme huts were built on the site during the Second World War. Additions included the Falkirk Ward completed in 1966 and the Windsor Unit completed in the late 1980s. After many of the services were transferred to the Forth Valley Royal Hospital, the Falkirk Royal Infirmary was downgraded to the status of community hospital in 2010. The minor injury unit, which treated emergency cases of a non life-threatening nature, closed in July 2011.
