= Larbert =

Town in Falkirk, Scotland

Coordinates: 56.02291°N 3.82602°W

Larbert: Scottish Gaelic: Leth-Pheairt; Scots: Lairbert
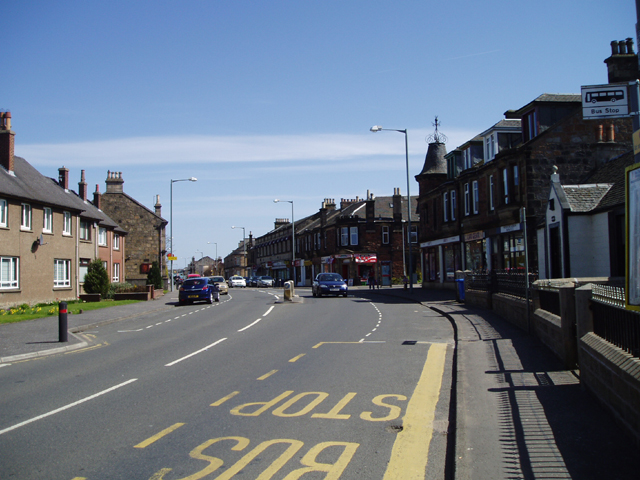
- The Main Street of Larbert

- Location within the Falkirk council area
- Area: 1.5 sq mi (3.9 km^{2})
- Population: 12,180 (2020)
  - Density: 4,283/sq mi (1,654/km^{2})
- OS grid reference: NS8650082500
- Council area: Falkirk
- Lieutenancy area: Stirling and Falkirk
- Country: Scotland
- Sovereign state: United Kingdom
- Post town: Larbert
- Postcode district: FK5
- Dialling code: 01324
- Police: Scotland
- Fire: Scottish
- Ambulance: Scottish
- UK Parliament: Falkirk
- Scottish Parliament: Falkirk West

Larbert (Scottish Gaelic: Leth-Pheairt, Scots: Lairbert) is a town in the Falkirk council area of Scotland. The town lies in the Forth Valley above the River Carron which flows from the west. Larbert is three miles (five kilometres) from the shoreline of the Firth of Forth and 2 1/2 miles (4 kilometres) northwest of Falkirk. Stenhousemuir lies directly east of Larbert, with both settlements being contiguous and sharing certain public amenities with one another.

In medieval times, the Larbert area was heavily forested, but this was cleared and gave rise to much of the agricultural land which surrounds the town. The coming of industry and especially the arrival in the 1840s of the Scottish Central Railway, which passes through the village, provided a base for economic growth. From the late 18th century until the mid-20th century heavy industry, such as boilermaking, casting and manufacturing underpinned the economy of Larbert. The Victorian era also saw the opening of the Stirling District Lunatic Asylum at Bellsdyke and Scottish National Institution for Children on the Stenhouse Estate. This made Larbert central in providing care, both locally and nationally.

Although the traditional economic base of Larbert dwindled with the decline of heavy industry, it has latterly experienced considerable growth as a commuter town. Many residents work in the nearby towns of Falkirk and Stirling, as well as the cities of Edinburgh and Glasgow. Scotland's Census of 2011 reveals that the population of Larbert has increased to 9,143 from the 2001 Census figure of 6,425 and it continues to grow with large-scale housing development on the northern periphery of the town as well as on brownfield sites.

== History ==
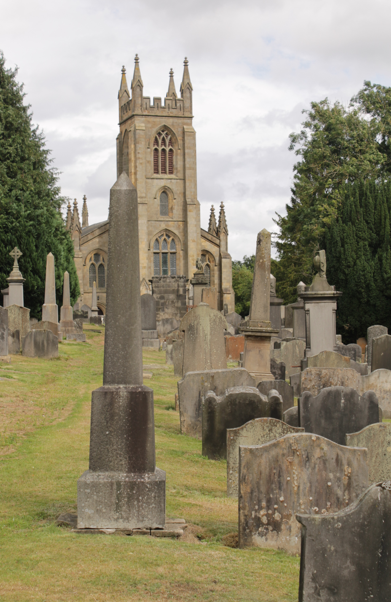
Larbert Parish Church and churchyard

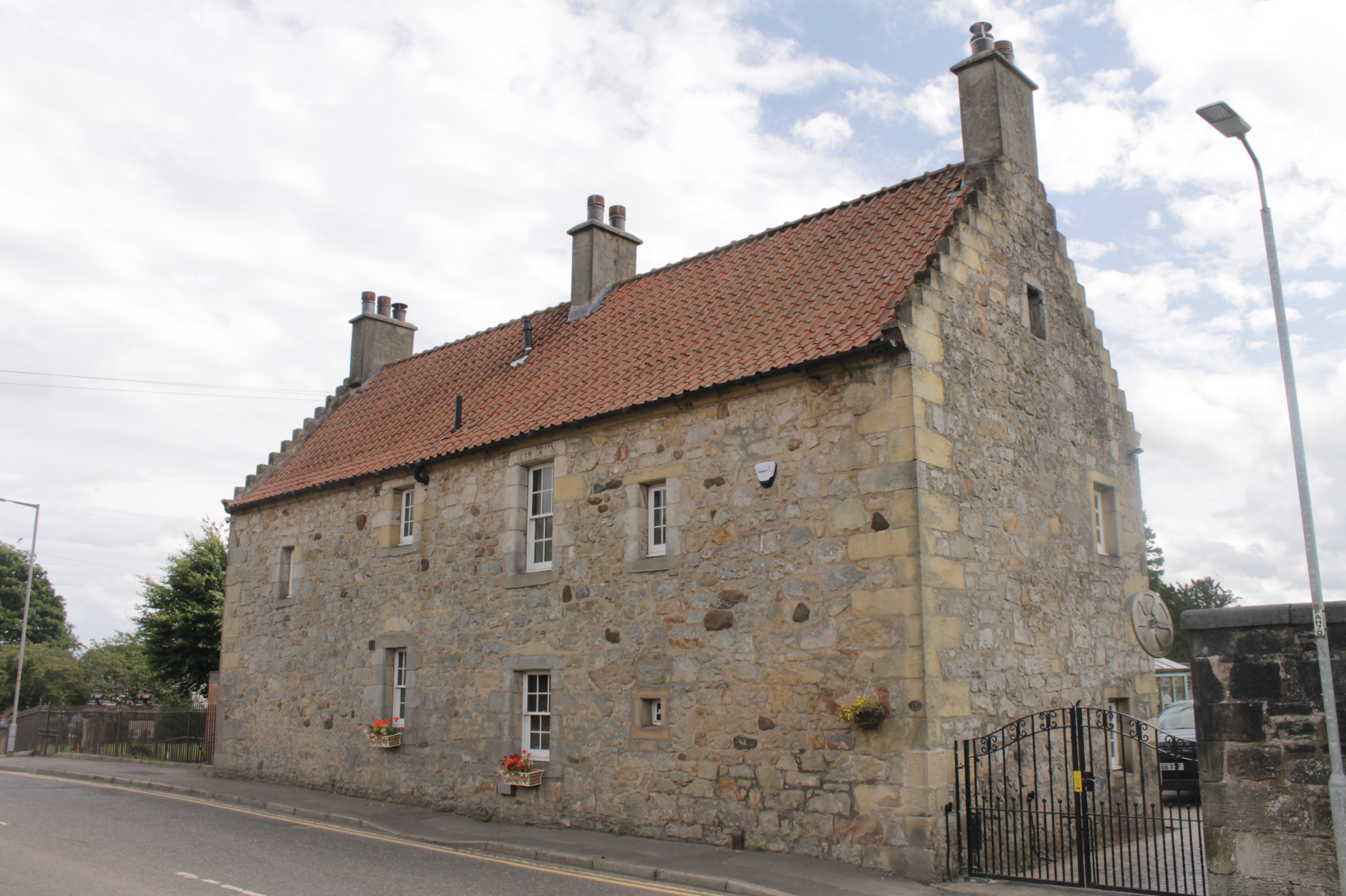
Old Larbert manse 1639

=== Origins ===
The origins of the name Larbert are uncertain. Historically, the name was variously written as Lairbert scheills or Laithbert scheills which signifies the scheills, or huts, of a man named Lairbert or Laithbert.

Historians believe that the origin of Larbert dates back to the Middle Ages when Scotland was beginning to emerge as a nation. The area in which Larbert lies was heavily forested at this time.

The lands to the south of Larbert and Camelon, in the area traversed by the Antonine Wall, were strategically important to the Romans. The crossing point on the River Carron at Larbert was an important transportation route for the Romans on the road they constructed from Watling Lodge on the Antonine Wall to Stirling. Early Ordnance Survey maps showed Larbert located on an old Roman Road between Camelon and Stirling, with the site of a Roman camp close by. An early Christian community, with a chapel, is believed to have existed close to the crossing point on the Carron around 1160.

=== 18th century ===
By the 1750s, Larbert constituted a small settlement on the main road between Falkirk and Stirling, which was turnpiked by an Act of Parliament in 1752. At this time, Larbert had at three mills powered by water from the nearby River Carron. These mills shut down in the 1980s and since then salmon and sea trout have returned in good numbers. The surrounding population, largely scattered, engaged in agriculture and took part in the important Falkirk Tryst (cattle market) held annually in nearby Stenhousemuir. In the 1950s, archaeological excavations to the north of present-day Larbert uncovered remains of a substantial pottery works with eight kilns dating from the 15th or 16th centuries (Hall and Hunter 2001).

Larbert's later growth is tied to the industrial development in the village itself as well as the wider parish. The pivotal event was the opening of the Carron Iron Works to the east of Stenhousemuir, in 1759, which produced a range of cast-iron goods and the Carronade, a naval cannon. The development of the iron works shifted the centre of the parish eastwards as people moved to closer to the Carron Ironworks for employment.

=== 19th century ===
Fortunes changed in the 1840s with the building of the Scottish Central Railway which was a catalyst for economic expansion in Larbert itself. Improved transportation led to Dobbie, Forbes and Company establishing a foundry in Larbert in 1872 which manufactured stoves, ranges and light castings. Three years later, James Jones, a local businessman, opened a sawmill on land adjacent to the Dobbie Forbes and Company foundry, which grew rapidly manufacturing timber frames. By the turn of the 20th century, Dobbie Forbes had a payroll of more than 200 employees. In 1888, a joint venture between Jones and the cashier of Dobbie, Forbes and Company, Dermont Campbell, produced the Jones and Campbell foundry on land close to the railway, which further cemented Larbert's position as a centre of heavy industry. By 1891, the parish of Larbert had a population of 900.

The 19th century also witnessed the establishment of the Scottish National Institution for the Education of Imbecile Children on land to the north of present-day Larbert. The institution, opened in 1863 at a cost of £13,000, provided care for minors between the age of 5 and 21. In 1948 the facility became known as the Royal Scottish National Hospital (RSNH). On adjacent land, the Stirling District Lunatic Asylum, opened in 1869 at a cost of £20,000, engaged in the treatment of those with mental illness. The asylum later became known as Bellsdyke Hospital.

The arrival of the tram in October 1905 improved transport between Larbert and many of its surrounding neighbours. The service followed a circular route through Larbert, Stenhousemuir, past the Carron Iron Works, through Bainsford and to Falkirk. Larbert's new closeness to surrounding communities raised concerns about the loss of village independence. A consortium of local industrialists and residents, fearing higher burgh rates, successfully resisted a 1912 proposal to incorporate nearby villages such as Larbert and Stenhousemuir into the larger town of Falkirk.

== Politics ==
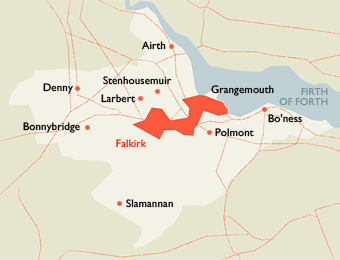
A map showing the boundaries of the Falkirk Council area, one of the 32 Unitary authorities of Scotland. Larbert sits to the north of the council area.

From 1891 Larbert was contained within the county of Stirlingshire and from 1894 until 1930 constituted its own civil parish. Larbert was located in the Falkirk district of the Central Regional Council area from 1975 to 1996. Since local government reorganisation in 1996, Larbert has been part of the Falkirk council area, which is one of Scotland's 32 local authorities. For registration purposes, Larbert remains a part of Stirlingshire and is part of the Stirling and Falkirk lieutenancy area.

For the purposes of local government, Larbert is located in the 'Bonnybridge and Larbert' ward of Falkirk Council, which elects three councillors under the single transferable vote system. Following the 2017 elections, the Bonnybridge and Larbert ward returned one councillor each for the Scottish National Party, Scottish Conservatives and one Independent. Larbert, Stenhousemuir and Torwood comprise one of Falkirk's community councils, which have a role in communicating local opinion to local and central government. Larbert combined with Stenhousemuir also forms one of the six Falkirk Council Area Forums, which represent aggregations of both council wards and community council areas. Forums are normally held every eight weeks, and their membership consists of all councillors representing the area, a representative from the community council, the local unit commander from Central Scotland Police and nominees from other local community groups.

Larbert is in the Falkirk West Scottish Parliament constituency. Since the May 2007 Scottish general election, the seat has been held by the SNP. The Member of the Scottish Parliament (MSP) for the constituency is Michael Matheson. In the Parliament of the United Kingdom, Larbert is part of the Falkirk constituency, which elects one member to the House of Commons. The current MP is Euan Stainbank of the Scottish Labour Party who has represented the Falkirk constituency since the 2024 United Kingdom general election.

== Geography ==
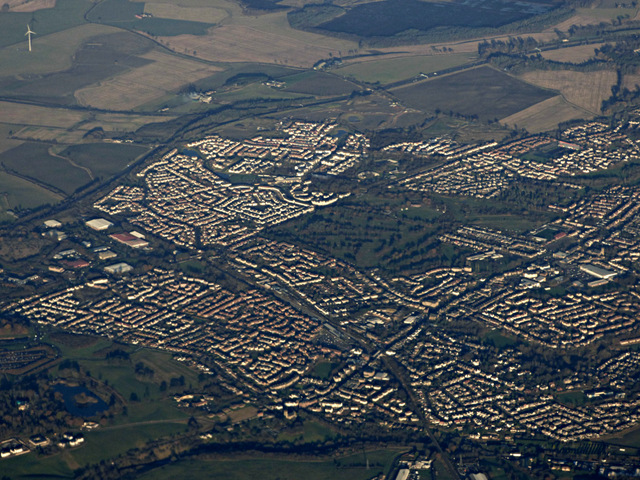
Larbert and Stenhousemuir

Larbert lies at an elevation of 30 metres (100 feet) above sea level. The settlement sits on a shelf of land overlooking the River Carron, which flows to the west. The river has its source in the Campsie Fells north of Glasgow, flowing into the Carron Valley Reservoir and past the town of Denny. After passing Larbert, the river flows through Falkirk before emptying into the Firth of Forth at Glensburgh, near Grangemouth.

Larbert has an area of 1 1/2 sq mi (4 km^{2}) and is contiguous with the town of Stenhousemuir to the east. Historically, Larbert and Stenhousemuir were united into one parish and consequently shared public amenities. Commonly, Larbert and Stenhousemuir are referred to as being part of the same locality.

The underlying geology of Larbert is primarily characterised by glacial deposits. Elevations above 10 metres (33 feet) are covered by a mixture of glacial till and boulder clay with low-lying areas covered by sandy soils and loams. The origins of much of the unsorted glacial rubble found in the area are eroded debris from the Campsie Fells and Kilsyth Hills to the west.

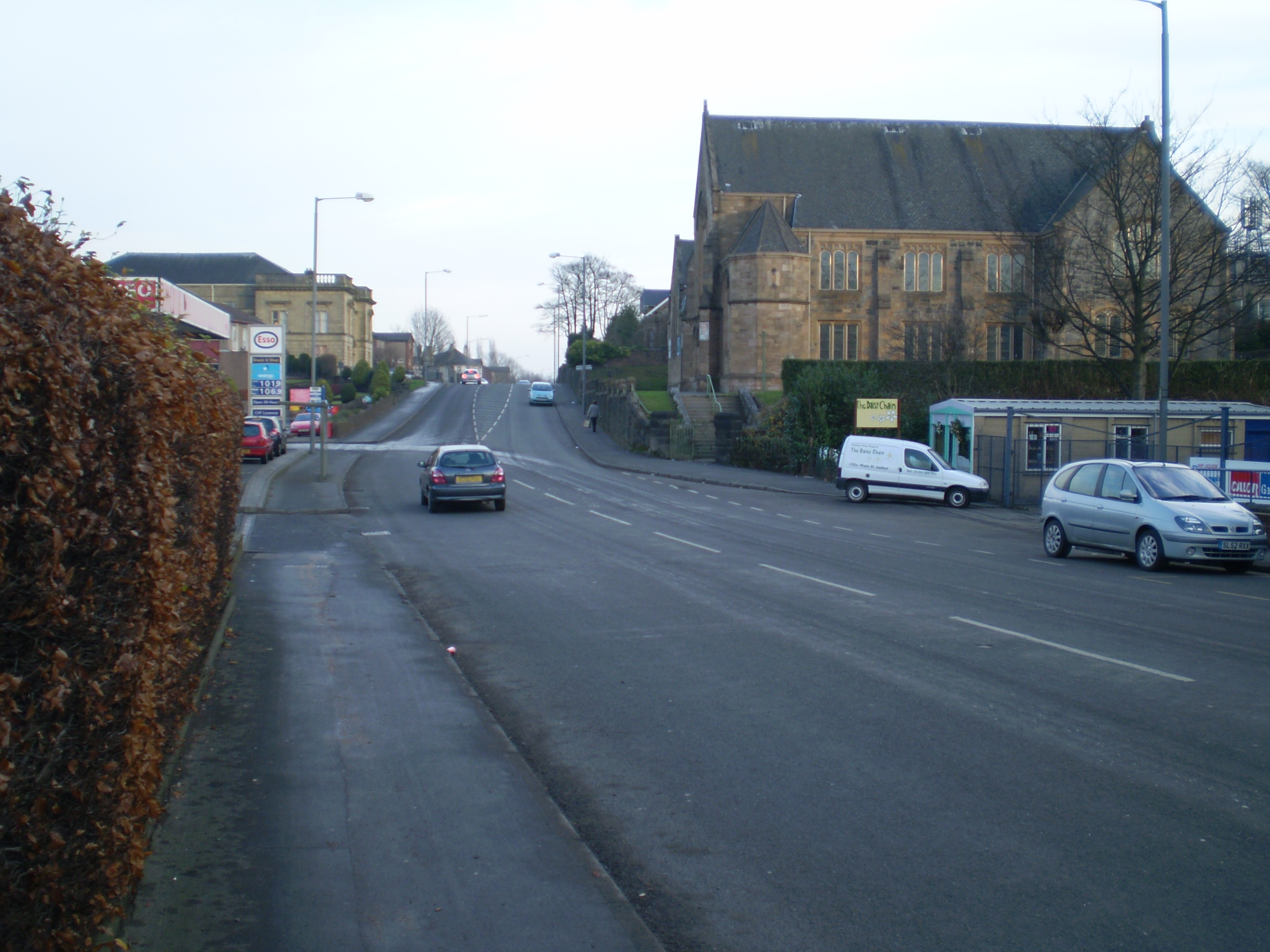
The point at which Larbert merges into Stenhousemuir is known as "The Brae". The photograph is taken looking east into Stenhousemuir, with Larbert West Church in the foreground.

In places, stratified till and boulder clay give rise to features of glacial deposition such as eskers, and drumlins that are predominant over much of the area north and east of Larbert and provide natural transportation routes. As Larbert is not far from the coast, post-glacial features akin to raised beaches are particularly prevalent south and west of the settlement, and this gives rise to differing elevations surrounding the town.

Beneath the surface layer of unsorted glacial till are strata of sandstone and ironstone which weathering and erosion have exposed above the surface in areas. Deposits of coal are found east of Larbert.

Like much of the rest of southern Scotland, Larbert experiences a temperate, maritime climate with mild winters, cool summers and evenly distributed rainfall. The prevailing wind direction is south-westerly, which brings warm, wet and unstable air associated with the North Atlantic Drift.

The predominant land use in Larbert is suburban. The urban environment of Larbert is a mix of housing styles ranging from 19th- and 20th-century developments to large detached villas built of stone in Victorian times for Larbert's industrialists. Much new housing development in Larbert is on brownfield sites, such as those west of the railway line, on reclaimed foundry land. As a result, little industrial land remains in the village itself. Larbert's surroundings are much more rural in character with scattered farmsteads on land between Larbert and the M9 motorway and between Larbert and the village of Plean. Parkland on the northwest side of Larbert has been given over to the development of a new hospital. The site of the former RSNH and Bellsdyke Hospital is slated for joint residential and commercial development and will be known as Kinnaird Village. There is open parkland south of Larbert.

== Demography ==
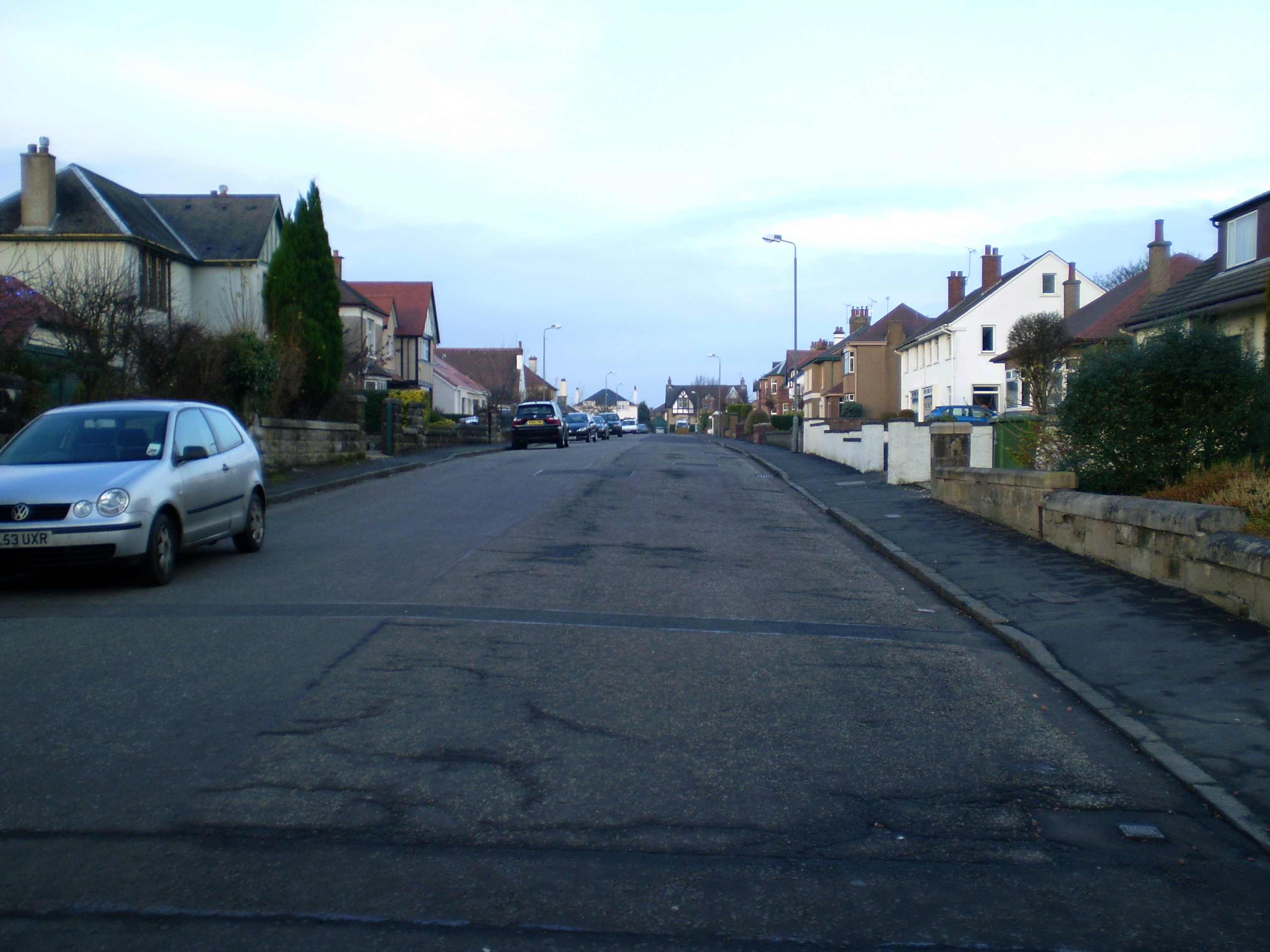
A street in the South Broomage area of Larbert with a mix of housing types

On Census night 2001, Larbert had a total resident population of 6,425, which has risen to 7,235 according to 2005 estimates. For statistical and census purposes, Larbert is normally combined with adjoining Stenhousemuir into one wider locality. In 2001, the Larbert and Stenhousemuir locality had a total population of 16,311, of whom 12,969 were aged 16 or over.

Disaggregated 2001 census data showed that Larbert proper had a higher proportion of those under age 15 than the Falkirk council area and Scottish average and a lower proportion of those over age 75. The census figures also showed that 1.7 percent of those who are economically active, were unemployed, lower than the Falkirk area average of 3.6 percent and the Scottish average of 3.9 percent.

In 2001, there were 2,542 dwellings in Larbert of which 76.8 percent were owner-occupied, a higher than average proportion compared to the surrounding area. Homes rented directly from the council or tenants associations, comprised 20.7 percent of the total housing stock in Larbert, with privately rented, or rent-free dwellings making up the remaining 2.5 percent.

Average house prices in Larbert have been among the fastest growing in Scotland and the UK. In 2005, the average house price in Larbert was £145,716, making it the ninth most expensive place in Scotland to buy property.

== Economy ==
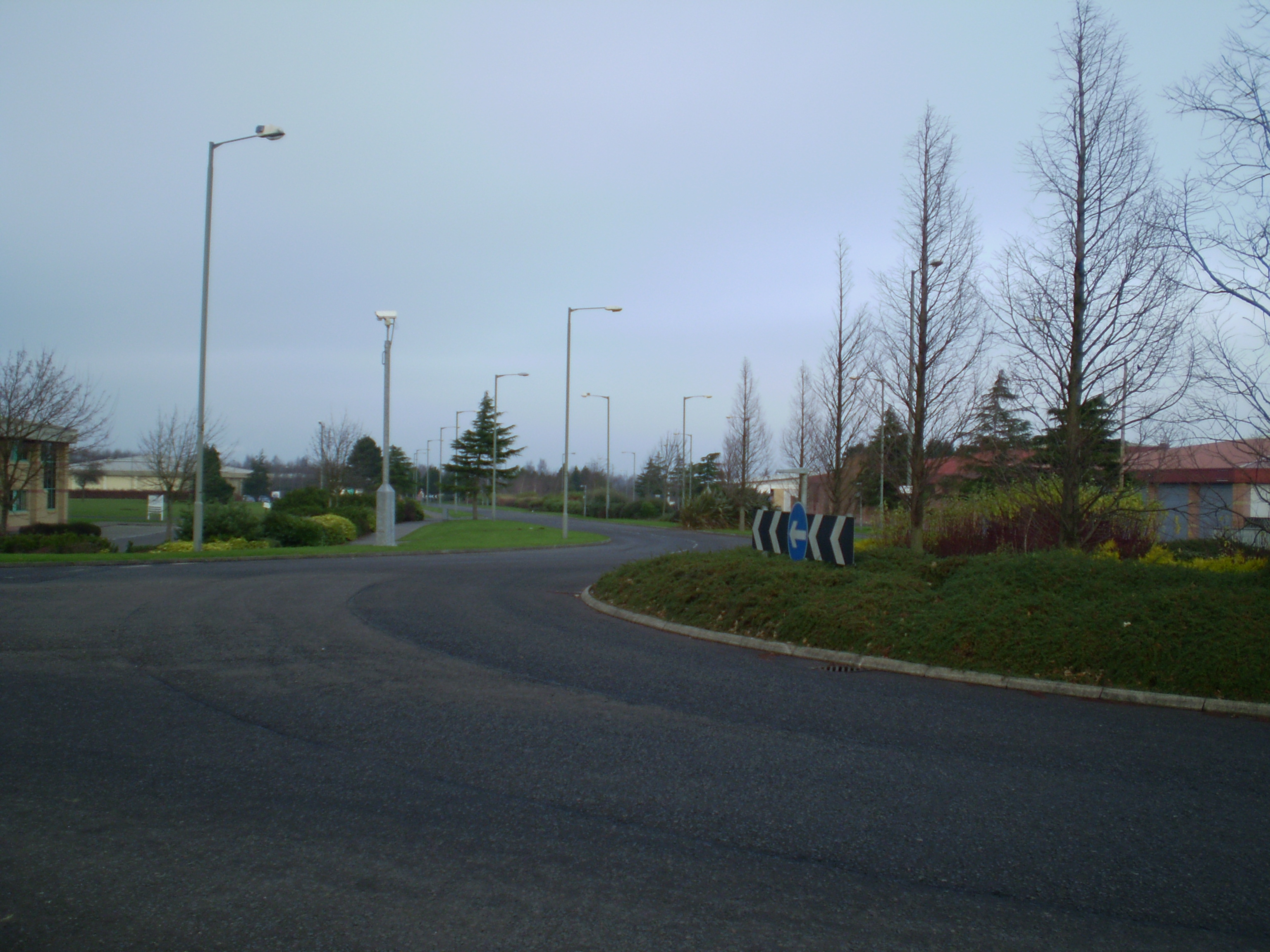
Central Business Park is home to a range of light service industries.

Today, Larbert is home to a range of light service industries. In 1992, 19 hectares (190,000 m^{2}) of the former RSNH site, on the northern flank of Larbert close to the A88 road, was developed into a business park. The site became known as 'Central Park'. Its first occupant was the US-based data storage corporation Exabyte, which opened in late 1992 and employed 80 workers. Towards the end of the following year, three more high tech firms arrived, which gave Central Park a combined floorspace of 14,000 square metres (150,000 sq ft).

Central Park was boosted further in 2000 with the creation of 700 jobs by the multi-client Telecom Service Centre (TSC) facility. Other occupants of the park include the travel firm Thomas Cook and the central Scotland baker Mathiesons, which has consolidated all operations onto one site. Glenbervie Business Park was developed next to Central Park with the help of local government and EU structural aid. The 28-hectare (280,000 m^{2}) site is suitable for a range of light industries. Larbert lacks a supermarket, but the main street of the town is home to small retail outlets and a post office.

The Lochlands Industrial area sits south of Larbert. One of the main tenants of the industrial park is Dowding and Mills, an electrical contractor, which opened a factory in 1979.

Most residents of Larbert work outside the town. Historically, the Carron Company, which developed east of Stenhousemuir, was a major employer. More recently, the bus builder Alexander Dennis, which has a large works at Camelon, has employed Larbert residents. Larbert sits in the travel to work area for both Edinburgh and Glasgow, with many residents commuting to work there daily.

== Transport ==
=== Train ===
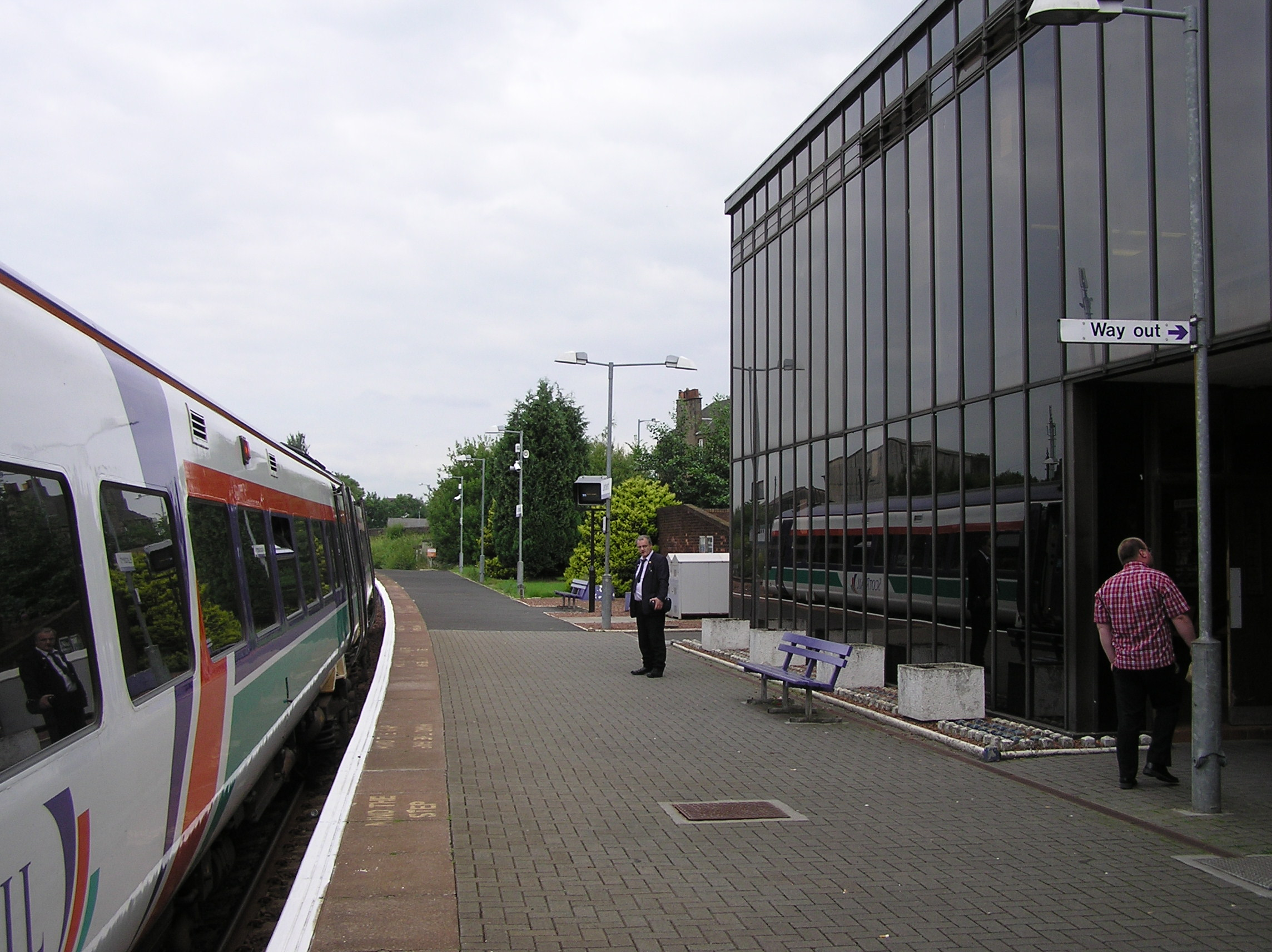
The southbound platform of Larbert railway station showing the main station building, which dates from 1976

Larbert railway station opened on 22 May 1848, when the Scottish Central Railway built its line through the village and narrowly survived the Beeching cuts of the 1960s. Larbert station lies north of one of the major rail junctions in central Scotland, where the line from Stirling and Perth splits into one branch heading to Glasgow and the other to Edinburgh. The station is on the Edinburgh to Dunblane and Croy Lines. Like most stations in Scotland, Larbert, which has two platforms, is owned by Network Rail and operated by ScotRail on their behalf. During the day, trains are half-hourly to Glasgow and Edinburgh and take 35 minutes and 45 minutes respectively to reach their destinations. There are four trains per hour to Stirling, which is a journey of 10 minutes. In 2005–06 there were 468,849 passenger journeys from the station, a rise of 9.6 percent on the previous year.

=== Road ===
As late as the 1970s, through traffic from Falkirk and Glasgow passed the outskirts of Larbert. Motorway construction in the area from 1980 onwards ran Central Scotland's important trunk roads close to Larbert. The nearest motorway is the M876, of which Junction 2 is the interchange for Larbert. The motorway connects with the M80, the principal route into Glasgow. The M9, the main route into Edinburgh, passes east of Larbert. The motorway's Junction 7 (Kincardine Bridge) is the nearest interchange for Larbert.

=== Bus ===
McGill's Midland Bluebird provide local bus services in Larbert and surrounding communities. Included is the local 'Circular' bus service, which connects Larbert with Stenhousemuir, Camelon, Bainsford and Falkirk. The nearest bus station to Larbert is in Falkirk.

== Public amenities ==
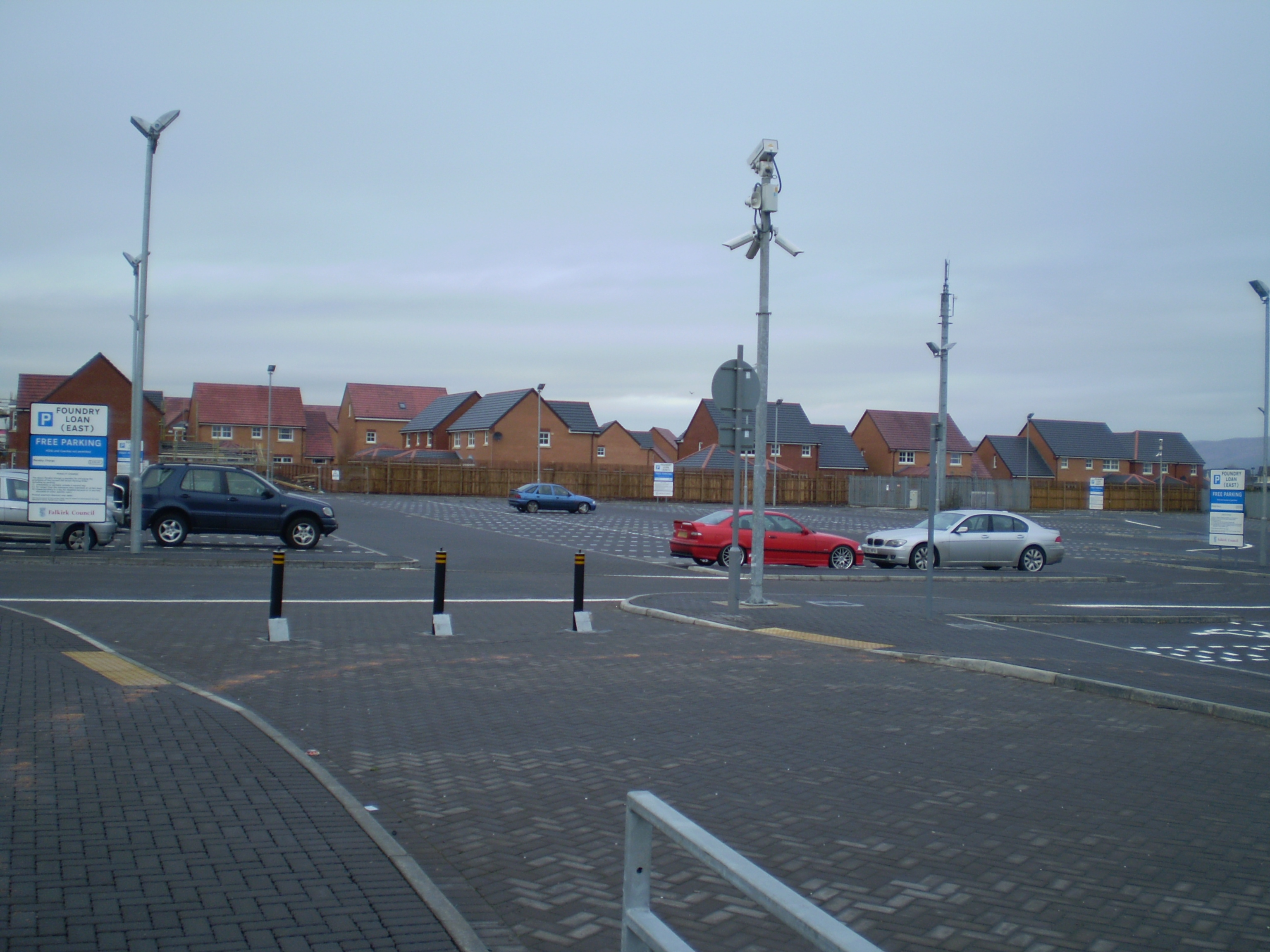
Public Transport hub in the centre of Larbert, close to the railway station, showing new brownfield housing development in the background

While having its own identity, Larbert is contiguous with the neighbouring settlement of Stenhousemuir, which borders its eastern side and has a larger population. As a result, the local centre of commercial gravity is located in Stenhousemuir, where most shops, the nearest health centre, high school and local government offices are found.

There are currently three primary schools in Larbert itself. Larbert Village Primary School dates from 1891 and has 270 pupils. Ladeside Primary School dates from 1970 and has a roll of 400 nursery and primary pupils. Additionally, pupils who live in the eastern portion of Larbert and live in the catchment area for Stenhousemuir Primary School attend there. A new purpose built 434-pupil primary school, Kinnaird Primary School, opened in January 2008 in North Larbert. Most secondary pupils attend Larbert High School, which historically was the main school for the whole of Larbert parish and serves secondary level pupils from the surrounding area and outlying villages such as Airth and Skinflats. Despite its name, Larbert High School lies entirely in Stenhousemuir.

The large Forth Valley Royal Hospital lies in Larbert. A small portion of the Bellsdyke Hospital complex, located on the outskirts of the town, still exists and provides psychiatric care only for patients in the Forth Valley health board area. In May 2007, construction began on a new 860-bed hospital for the Stirling and Falkirk on the site of the former RSNH in Larbert. the Forth Valley Royal Hospital (FVRH) will replace and combine existing facilities at both Falkirk and Stirling on a new site. The construction phase of the project was expected to be completed by December 2009.

The Falkirk Council local authority provides all waste management services, with recycling facilities at Roughmute near Denny and at Kinneil Kerse in Bo'ness.

There are three 18-hole golf courses close to Larbert. Falkirk Tryst Golf Club, on the boundary between Larbert and Stenhousemuir, is a parkland-style course with a length of 6,053 yards (5,535 m). Falkirk Golf Club, is located on the outskirts of Larbert, between the town and Camelon. About one mile (two kilometres) north is the Glenbervie Golf Club. Larbert also has its own lawn bowls club.

There is a cricket club in Stenhousemuir, which adjoins Larbert. Stenhousemuir Cricket Club based on part of the old Trysting grounds at Tryst Road. As a club it has been in existence for over 135 years and many international cricketers came from within its ranks.

== Buildings and landmarks ==
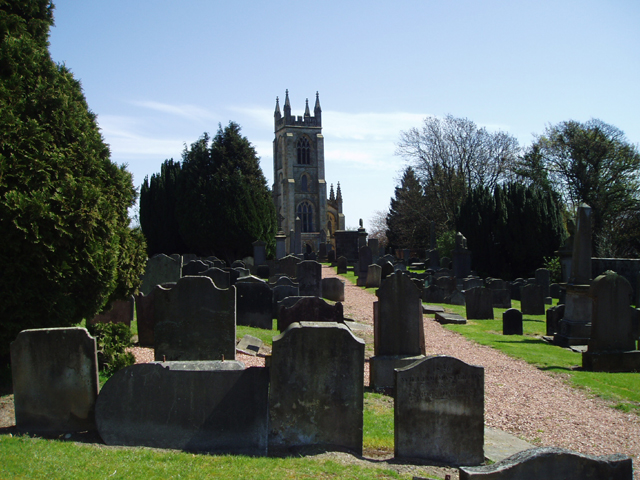
Larbert Old Parish Church, built in 1820, stands above the River Carron on Larbert Cross.

Larbert Old Parish Church stands on the western approaches to Larbert, above the River Carron. The church, designed by the Scottish architect David Hamilton, was built in 1820 at a cost of £3,000 using sandstone from a local quarry. The church was built at a time of population growth and increasing prosperity in Larbert and its parish, which necessitated the construction of a more modern place of worship. As Larbert grew during the 19th century, the church again became too small. Major alterations to the building were carried out in the 1880s. An early chapel under the domain of the Abbot of Cambuskenneth is believed to have stood in the vicinity of the present-day church. The church is now under threat of closure as of June 2016

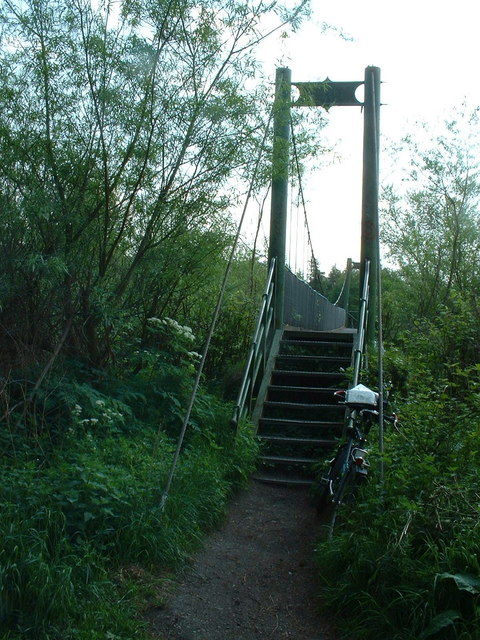
Dorrator Iron Bridge was built in 1893.

At the southern tip of the village, the Dorrator Iron Bridge used to span a meander in the River Carron until it was dismantled and replaced with a new bridge adjacent to the surviving pillar on the west side of the river, connecting Larbert with the neighbouring settlement of Camelon. The bridge was constructed in 1893 on the site of a ford, which could rarely be used when the river was in full flow. The bridge is reached via a footpath leading from the bottom of Carronvale Road in Larbert.

Larbert Bridge was the original crossing over the Carron and was built in the 17th century. A toll was collected in the 18th century, payable to the Earl of Callendar and Linlithgow and levied at " ...four pennies Scots for each cart, two pennies for each loaded horse and twelve pennies Scots for each score of droves of cows that shall pass along the said bridge." A later, more modern crossing built next to Larbert Bridge carries the main A9 road from Larbert to Falkirk. Nearby, a 19th-century viaduct, built outside Larbert, carries the railway into town. The main A9 road passes underneath.

The Station Hotel, close to Larbert's railway station, has been a central focal point of Larbert for many years. An inn or public house has stood on the spot of the current hotel for as long as the railway has passed through Larbert.

The Victorian Gothic structures of the Royal Scottish National Hospital (RSNH) and Bellsdyke Hospital existed in a dilapidated state until their eventual and very controversial demolition in 2015, most of the grounds are being used for new housing development. Carronvale House is an 18th-century category A listed building, now home to the Scottish Headquarters of the Boys' Brigade.

== Notable people ==
Robert Bruce of Kinnaird, early church leader.

Arthur Mitchell, based at Larbert Hospital, and his son, Sydney Mitchell the eminent British Arts and Crafts architect, who was born in Larbert.

The Abyssinian explorer James Bruce was born at Kinnaird, just outside Larbert in 1730 and is buried in the graveyard of Larbert Old Parish Church. Bruce travelled through much of Africa and in the process traced the origins of the Blue Nile. It was said that Bruce was fluent in 13 languages and stood over 6 feet 4 inches (1.93 m) tall.

Thomas Hardy, parliamentary reformer and co-founder of the London Corresponding Society, was born in Larbert in 1752 and ran a boot-making business there. He moved to London, where he continued boot-making until he became involved in parliamentary reform.

John Baildon, a pioneer in metallurgy, was born in Larbert in 1772. Baildon was involved in pioneering industrial undertakings such as the construction of the first blast furnaces fired by coke in continental Europe.

The Scottish-American actor Jimmy Finlayson was born in Larbert in 1887. Finlayson worked in silent movies as well as sound movies and starred opposite Stan Laurel and Oliver Hardy.

Actor Robbie Coltrane died in Larbert at the age of 72.
