= Lord Elibank =

Lordship of Elibank
- Blazon: Quarterly: 1st and 4th, Or a Fetterlock Azure on a chief of the second three Mullets Argent (Murray of Blackbarony); 2nd and 3rd, Azure three Mullets within a Double Tressure flory counterflory Argent in the centre a Martlet Or (Murray of Elibank)
- Creation date: 18 March 1643
- Peerage: Peerage of Scotland
- First holder: Patrick Murray, 1st Lord Elibank
- Present holder: Robert Francis Alan Erskine-Murray, 15th Lord Elibank
- Heir presumptive: The Hon. Timothy Alexander Elibank Erskine-Murray
- Subsidiary titles: Baronet of Elibank
- Seat: The Coach House
- Motto: Virtute Fideque (By virtue and faith)

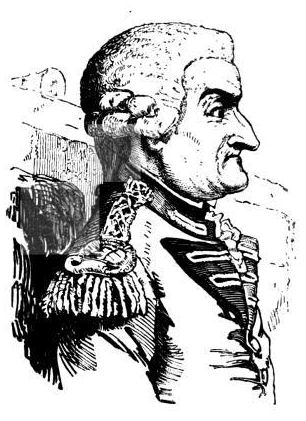
Patrick Murray, 5th Lord Elibank

Lord Elibank, of Ettrick Forest in the County of Selkirk, is a title in the Peerage of Scotland. It was created in 1643 for Sir Patrick Murray, 1st Baronet, with remainder to his heirs male whatsoever. He had already been created a Baronet, of Elibank, in the Baronetage of Nova Scotia in 1628.

== History ==
The first Lord's great-great-grandson, the fifth Lord, was an author and economist. He was succeeded by his younger brother, the sixth Lord, who was an admiral in the Royal Navy. On his death the titles passed to his nephew, the seventh Lord. He represented Peeblesshire in the House of Commons and also served as Lord Lieutenant of Peeblesshire.

His great-grandson, the tenth Lord, was also Lord Lieutenant of Peeblesshire. In 1911 he was created Viscount Elibank, of Elibank in the County of Selkirk, in the Peerage of the United Kingdom. His eldest son and heir apparent, Alexander Murray, Master of Elibank, was a Liberal politician and was created Baron Murray of Elibank in 1912. However, he predeceased his father and the Viscount was succeeded by his younger son, the second Viscount. He sat as Member of Parliament for Glasgow St Rollox and served as Lord Lieutenant of Peeblesshire. On his death the titles passed to his younger brother, the third Viscount. He represented Kincardineshire in Parliament as a Liberal.

However, on his death in 1962 the viscountcy became extinct while he was succeeded in the baronetcy and lordship by his third cousin, the thirteenth Lord. He was the great-grandson of the Hon. James Murray, fourth son of the seventh Lord. He was succeeded his first cousin, the fourteenth Lord. He was the son of Robert Alan Erskine-Murray, uncle of the thirteenth Lord. As of 2017 the titles are held by his son, the fifteenth Lord, who succeeded his father in that year.

The Honourable Alexander Murray of Elibank, fourth son of the fourth Lord, played a significant role in an abortive Jacobite conspiracy, in 1752, thereafter known as the Elibank Plot. He afterwards retired to France, where for some years he was, as "Count Murray", the representative of the Jacobite claimant "James III and VIII", known as the "Old Pretender", who created him Earl of Westminster (Letters Patent, August 12, 1759) in the Jacobite Peerage, with remainder to heirs male of the body of his father, the fourth Lord Elibank.

== Family seat ==
The family seat was Elibank Castle on the River Tweed just east of Walkerburn in the Scottish Borders but is now The Coach House, near Sunningdale, Berkshire.

== Ancestors of the Lords Elibank ==
- John Murray (died 1477)
- ? Murray
- John Murray (killed at the Battle of Flodden in 1513)
- Sir Andrew Murray of Blackbarony (died 1572)
- Sir Gideon Murray, Lord Elibank (died 1621), commissioner of the Borders between 1605 and 1617.
- General James Murray, son of 4th Lord Elibank

== Lords Elibank (1643) ==
- Patrick Murray, 1st Lord Elibank (died 1649)
- Patrick Murray, 2nd Lord Elibank (died 1671)
- Patrick Murray, 3rd Lord Elibank (died 1687)
- Alexander Murray, 4th Lord Elibank (1677–1736)
- Patrick Murray, 5th Lord Elibank (1703–1778)
- George Murray, 6th Lord Elibank (1706–1785)
- Alexander Murray, 7th Lord Elibank (1747–1820)
- Alexander Murray, 8th Lord Elibank (1780–1830)
- Alexander Oliphant-Murray, 9th Lord Elibank (1804–1871)
- Montolieu Fox Oliphant-Murray, 10th Lord Elibank (1840–1927) (created Viscount Elibank in 1910)

== Viscount Elibank (1911) ==
- Montolieu Fox Oliphant-Murray, 1st Viscount Elibank (1840–1927)
  - Alexander William Charles Oliphant Murray, 1st Baron Murray of Elibank (1870–1920)
- Gideon Oliphant-Murray, 2nd Viscount Elibank (1877–1951)
- Arthur Cecil Murray, 3rd Viscount Elibank (1879–1962)

== Lords Elibank (1643; Reverted) ==
- James Alastair Frederick Campbell Erskine-Murray, 13th Lord Elibank (1902–1973)
- Alan D'Ardis Erskine-Murray, 14th Lord Elibank (1923–2017)
- Robert Francis Alan Erskine-Murray, 15th Lord Elibank (b. 1964)

The heir presumptive is the present holder's brother, Hon. Timothy Alexander Elibank Erskine-Murray (b. 1967)
The heir presumptive's heir apparent is his son, Alexander Alan John Erskine-Murray (b. 2003)

== Attribution ==
- Hesilrige, Arthur G. M. (1921). Debrett's Peerage and Titles of courtesy. 160A Fleet Street, London, UK: Dean & Son. p. 338.
- Kidd, Charles & Williamson, David (editors). Debrett's Peerage and Baronetage (1990 edition). New York: St Martin's Press, 1990,
- Leigh Rayment's Peerage Pages
- Ruvigny and Raineval, Marquis of, "The Jacobite Peerage", Edinburgh, 1904,
- Douglas, Robert, Sir (1764). The peerage of Scotland : containing an historical and genealogical account of the nobility of that kingdom, ... Collected from the public records and ancient chartularies of this nation, ... Illustrated with copper-plates. printed for John Donaldson, London, Edinburgh. Pages 240 - 242
