= Alan D'Ardis Erskine-Murray, 14th Lord Elibank =

Scottish nobleman

Alan D'Ardis Erskine-Murray
- Born: 31 December 1923
- Died: 30 November 2017 (aged 93)
- Occupation: Nobleman

Alan D'Ardis Erskine-Murray, 14th Lord Elibank (31 December 1923 – 30 November 2017) was a Scottish nobleman and a descendant of Patrick Murray, 1st Lord Elibank of the Lords Elibank of Ettrick Forest in the County of Selkirk.

== Biography ==
The eldest son of Robert Alan Erskine-Murray, Alan D'Ardis Erskine-Murray, 14th Lord Elibank was born on 31 December 1923 and educated at Bedford School and at Peterhouse, Cambridge. He was commissioned a second lieutenant in the Royal Engineers in May 1943, and served with them during the Second World War. He was admitted by Middle Temple as a barrister in 1949. He succeeded to the title of 14th Baronet Murray of Etrick Forest and 14th Lord Elibank of Etrick Forest upon the death of James Alastair Frederick Campbell Erskine-Murray, 13th Lord Elibank, on 2 June 1973. He is also the 11th titular Earl of Westminster in the Jacobite Peerage, under the terms of the Letters Patent of 12 August 1759, issued by "King James VIII and III", known as the Old Pretender, to the Honourable Alexander Murray of Elibank, fourth son of the fourth Lord Elibank, who played a significant role in an abortive Jacobite conspiracy, in 1752, thereafter known as the Elibank Plot.

He died on 30 November 2017 at the age of 93.

Peerage of Scotland
Preceded by James Alastair Frederick Campbell Erskine-Murray	Lord Elibank; 1973–2017	Succeeded by Robert Francis Alan Erskine-Murray
