= Elibank Castle =

Ruined fortified house in the Scottish Borders

Coordinates: 55.6167°N 2.9590°W

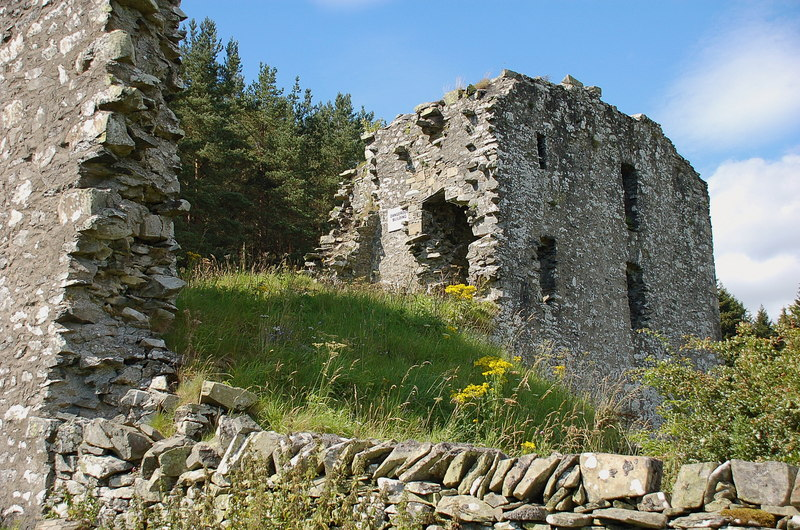
Elibank Castle near Walkerburn

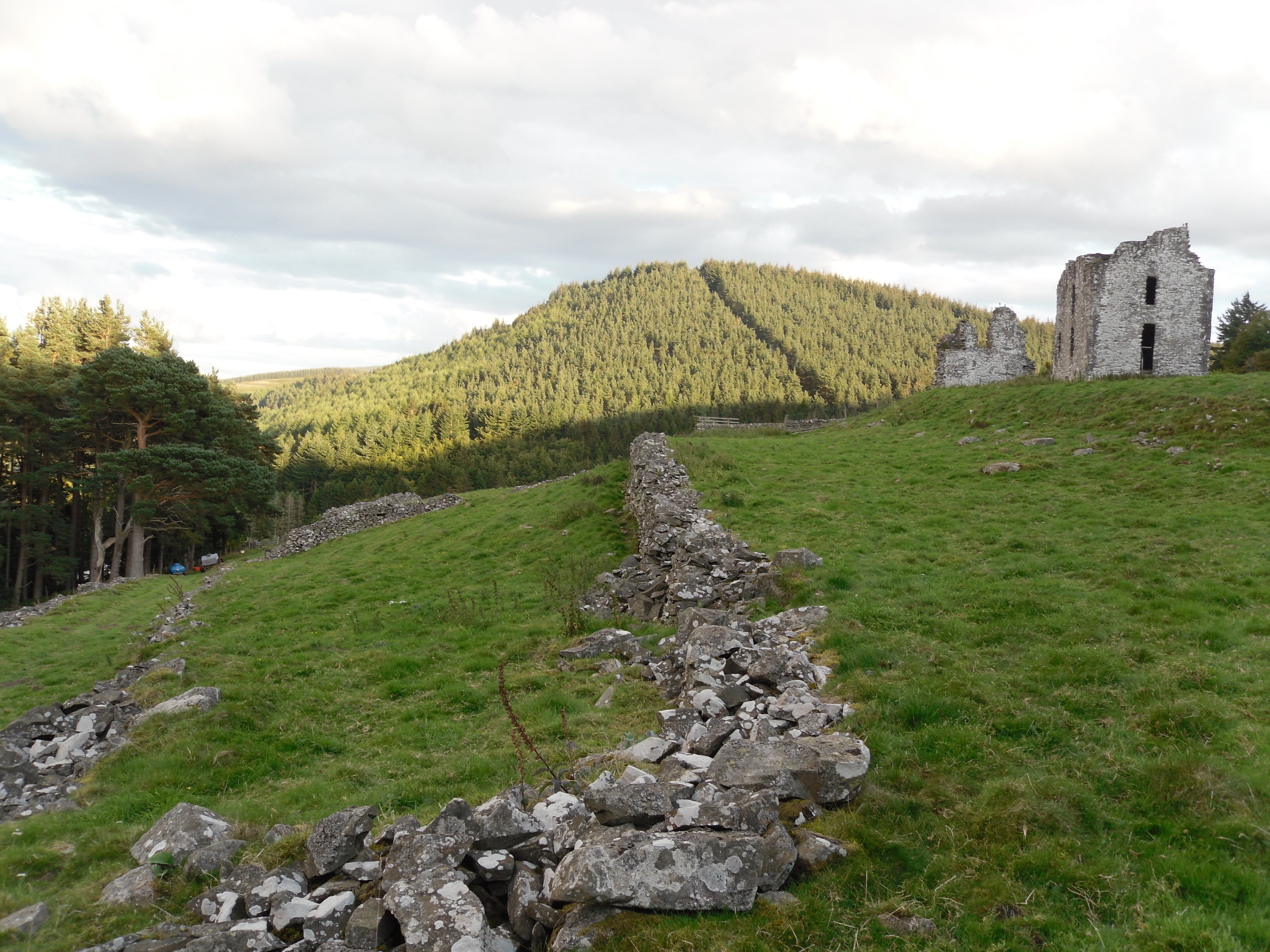
Garden terraces at Elibank Castle

Elibank Castle is a ruined fortified house dating from the late 16th century. It stands south of the River Tweed and the A72, around 3km east of Walkerburn in the Scottish Borders. The ruins are a scheduled monument.

== History ==
In 1511 King James IV granted a charter to Catherine Douglas, widow of John Liddale, and her son John Liddale, of farmland and forests at Aleburn or Eliburn, on provision that the family built a stone house, barn, doocot and cattlesheds on the land to secure it. In 1594 the house passed to Gideon Murray of Glenpoit (the neighbouring estate) who built a castle there around 1595 giving it the name Elibank. From him, the house passed to a series of Lord Elibank. The building was ruinous by 1722.

== Gardens ==
At the Union of the Crowns in 1603, a number of courtiers and administrators improved their gardens in Scotland following European models. As such, Gideon Murray, who was depute-treasurer in Scotland, constructed an Italianate series of terraces on three sides of the Castle, amongst the grandest in Scotland.
