= Walkerburn railway station =

Disused railway station in Walkerburn, Scottish Borders

Walkerburn
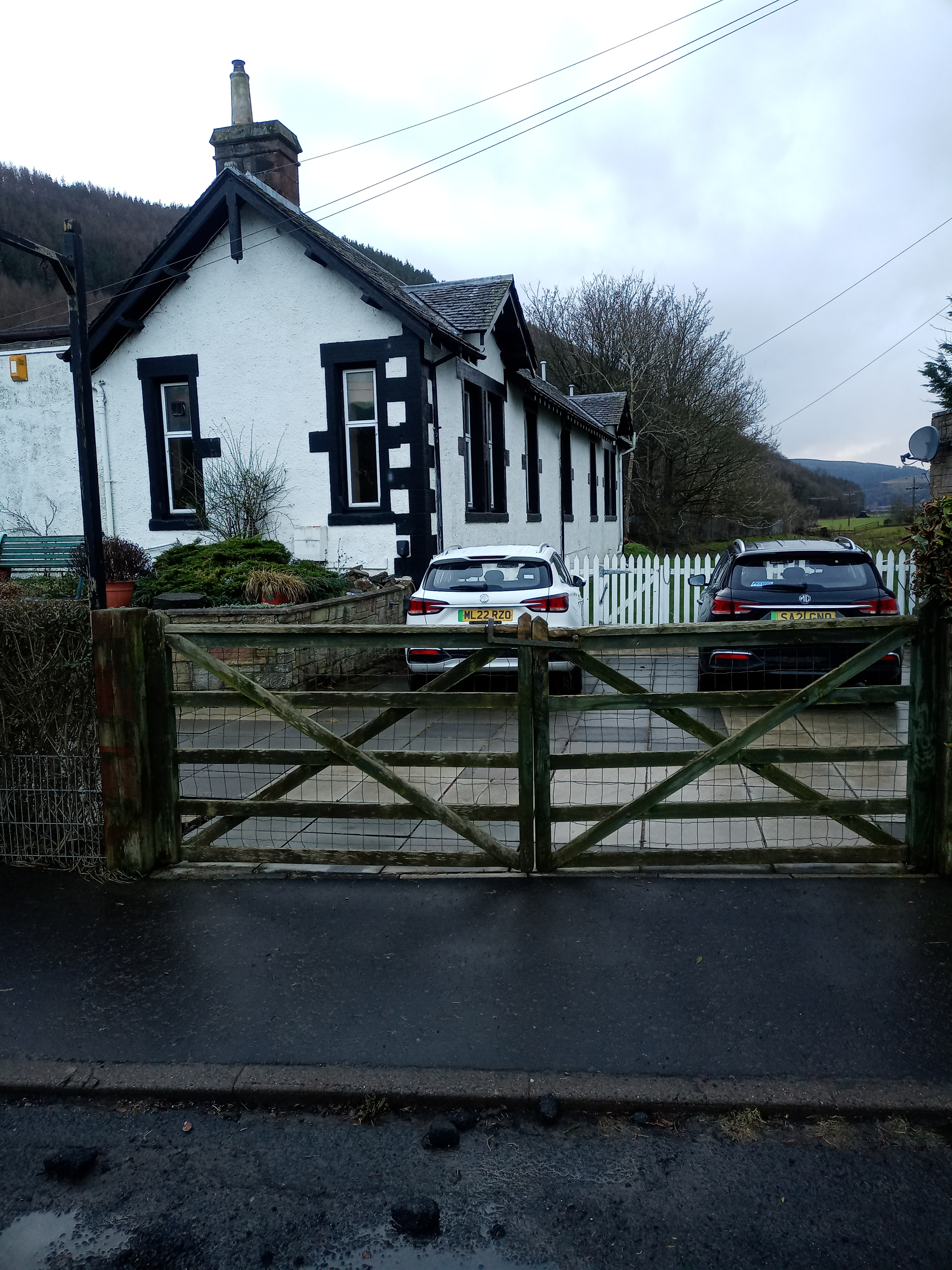
- in 2023

General information
- Location: Walkerburn, Scottish Borders; Scotland
- Coordinates: 55.6206°N 3.0166°W
- Grid reference: NT360368
- Platforms: 1

Other information
- Status: Disused

History
- Original company: Peebles Railway
- Pre-grouping: North British Railway
- Post-grouping: LNER; British Rail (Scottish Region)

Key dates
- 15 January 1867: Opened
- 5 February 1962: Closed
Location

Walkerburn railway station served the village of Walkerburn, Scottish Borders, Scotland from 1867 to 1962 on the Peebles Railway.

== History ==
The station opened on 15 January 1867 by the Peebles Railway. It was situated on the west side of an unnamed minor road running on from Cabberston Road. The station was not ready when the line to Galashiels was extended on 18 June 1866; it opened 6 months later. The yard consisted of two sidings, both of which were loops giving access from both directions. The siding closer to the main line passed through a stone-built goods shed with a canopy on one side to protect goods vehicles while they were unloading. The station closed to passengers and goods traffic on 5 February 1962.

Preceding station	Disused railways	Following station
Innerleithen; Line and station closed	North British Railway; Peebles Railway	Thornielee; Line and station closed
