= Clovenfords railway station =

Disused railway station in Scottish Borders, Scotland

Clovenfords
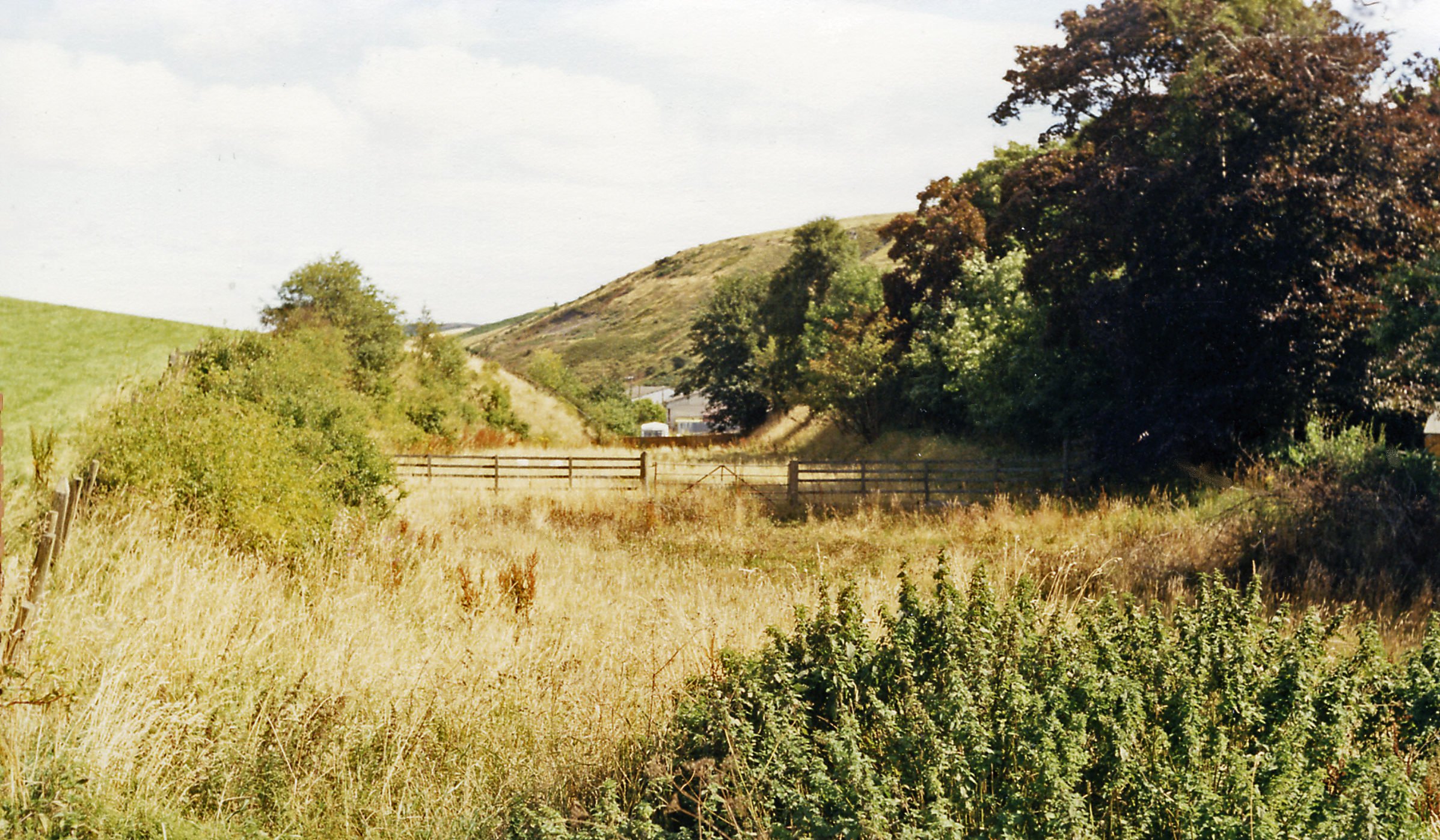
- Site of the former station in 1988

General information
- Location: Clovenfords, Scottish Borders; Scotland
- Coordinates: 55.6203°N 2.8732°W
- Grid reference: NT451366
- Platforms: 1

Other information
- Status: Disused

History
- Original company: Peebles Railway
- Pre-grouping: North British Railway
- Post-grouping: LNER; British Rail (Scottish Region)

Key dates
- 18 June 1866: Opened
- 5 February 1962: Closed
Location

Clovenfords railway station served the village of Clovenfords, Scottish Borders, Scotland, from 1866 to 1962 on the Peebles Railway.

== History ==
The station opened on 18 June 1866 by the Peebles Railway. It was situated on the north side of Station Yard. In 1880, the map shows a small station building and no goods yard but by the late 19th century the building had been enlarged and a small goods yard was provided. The goods yard consisted of a loop giving access from both sides and passed a cattle dock. At the south end of the dock, a siding left the loop and split; one road leading to a timber goods shed and the other going behind it. The station closed to passengers and goods traffic on 5 February 1962.

Preceding station	Disused railways	Following station
Angling Club Cottage Platform; Line and station closed	North British Railway; Peebles Railway	Galashiels; Line and station closed
