= Thornielee railway station =

Disused railway station in Thornielee, Scottish Borders

Thornielee

General information
- Location: Thornielee, Scottish Borders; Scotland
- Coordinates: 55.6156°N 2.935°W
- Grid reference: NT412361
- Platforms: 1

Other information
- Status: Disused

History
- Original company: Peebles Railway
- Pre-grouping: North British Railway
- Post-grouping: LNER; British Railways (Scottish Region)

Key dates
- 18 June 1866: Opened as Thornilee
- March 1872: Name corrected to Thornielee
- 6 November 1950: Closed
Location

Thornielee railway station served the smallholding of Thornielee, Scottish Borders, Scotland from 1866 to 1950 on the Peebles Railway.

== History ==
The station opened on 18 June 1866 by the Peebles Railway. The station was situated south of the A72 and was accessed from a drive from the level crossing to the west. The station was called Thornilee but it was corrected to Thornielee in March 1872. There was no signal box but there was a small goods yard on the up side to the west. It consisted of a single siding accessed from the east with a loop. The station was never busy and closed to both passengers and goods traffic on 6 November 1950.

Preceding station	Disused railways	Following station
Walkerburn; Line and station closed	North British Railway; Peebles Railway	Angling Club Cottage Platform; Line and station closed
