= Angling Club Cottage Platform railway station =

Disused railway station in Selkirk, Scottish Borders

Angling Club Cottage Platform

General information
- Location: Selkirk, Scottish Borders; Scotland
- Coordinates: 55.6092°N 2.9031°W
- Grid reference: NT432354
- Platforms: 1

Other information
- Status: Disused

History
- Original company: North British Railway
- Pre-grouping: North British Railway
- Post-grouping: LNER British Railways (Scottish Region)

Key dates
- 1898: Opened
- Late 1940s: Closed
Location

Angling Club Cottage Platform served the Edinburgh Angling Club in Selkirk, Scottish Borders, Scotland from 1898 to the late 1940s.

== History ==
The station opened in 1898 by the North British Railway. The station was situated behind 'the nest' and on the north side of the A72. This was a private halt for the members of the Edinburgh Angling Club who were using the club's cottage 'The Nest'. Passengers who wanted a train to stop at the halt had to notify the stationmaster at Thornielee or Clovenfords and passengers wanting to be picked up had to give prior notice. Members of the Edinburgh Angling Club could get special tickets to/from the station but regular passengers had to buy a ticket from the previous/next station. Tickets would be collected at the previous station and passengers would have to buy a ticket in advance. The station closed to passengers and goods traffic in the late 1940s, although the actual date of closure is not recorded.

Preceding station	Disused railways	Following station
Thornielee; Line and station closed	North British Railway; Peebles Railway	Clovenfords; Line and station closed
