= Gideon Murray =

Scottish administrator

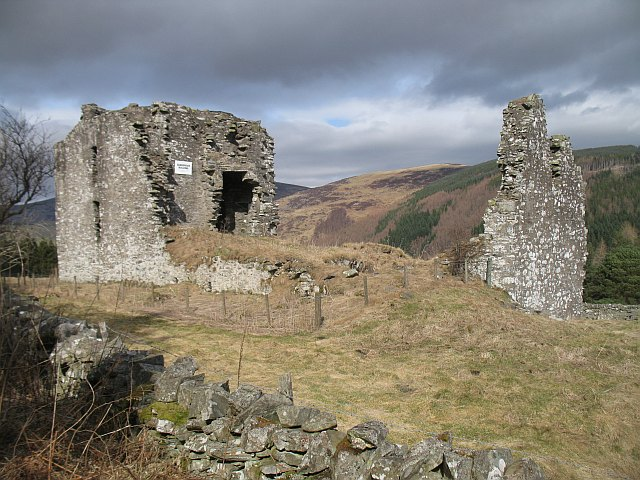
Elibank Castle

Sir Gideon Murray of Elibank (died 1621), was a Scottish courtier and landowner, who served as Treasurer-Depute of Scotland and Keeper of the Honours of Scotland.

== Family ==
Gideon Murray was the third son of Sir Andrew Murray of Black Barony (died 1572), and Grisel Beaton, a daughter of Sir John Beaton of Creich, Fife. Regent Arran paid a dowry for her of £133. Gideon was a grandson of Isobel Hoppar.

In July 1595 his sister Margaret Murray married Robert Halkett, Laird of Pitfirrane, and there was a banquet in Edinburgh attended by Anne of Denmark. Their son James married the writer, Anne Murray, Lady Halkett.

== Career ==
He was educated at the University of Glasgow.

He was a prisoner in Edinburgh Castle in October 1585, and released with a caution of £5,000 Scots from his brother, James Murray of Blackbarony, to remain in Edinburgh.

In July 1592 Murray was commanded to demolish the towers of Harden and Dryhope, belonging to Walter Scott of Harden, because Scott had taken part in the assault on Falkland Palace led by Francis Stewart, 5th Earl of Bothwell in June.

Murray was appointed a Commissioner of Borders in 1603, and was knighted for this service in 1605. He became a member of the Privy Council of Scotland in 1610 and as a Commissioner to the Exchequer received a pension of £1200 per annum. In August 1610 his son was challenged by the second son of Lord Cranstoun to fight a duel, which the Privy Council was anxious to prevent. Cranstoun's son James was imprisoned in Blackness Castle, young Murray in Edinburgh Castle for concealing the meeting. Lord Cranstoun was questioned by the Council on suspicion that he had encouraged his son for personal advantage. James Cranstoun was banished.

In 1612 he was made a Lord of Session as Lord Elibank. In the same year as Shire Commissioner for Selkirkshire he obtained a seat in the Houses of Parliament.

Gideon Murray was the uncle of Sir Robert Kerr, Lord Rochester and Earl of Somerset, the favourite of King James. Somerset's influence led to the appointment of Murray as Treasurer Depute of Scotland. The role involved management of the repairs to the royal castles and palaces in Scotland, as well as work on Glasgow Cathedral in 1620.

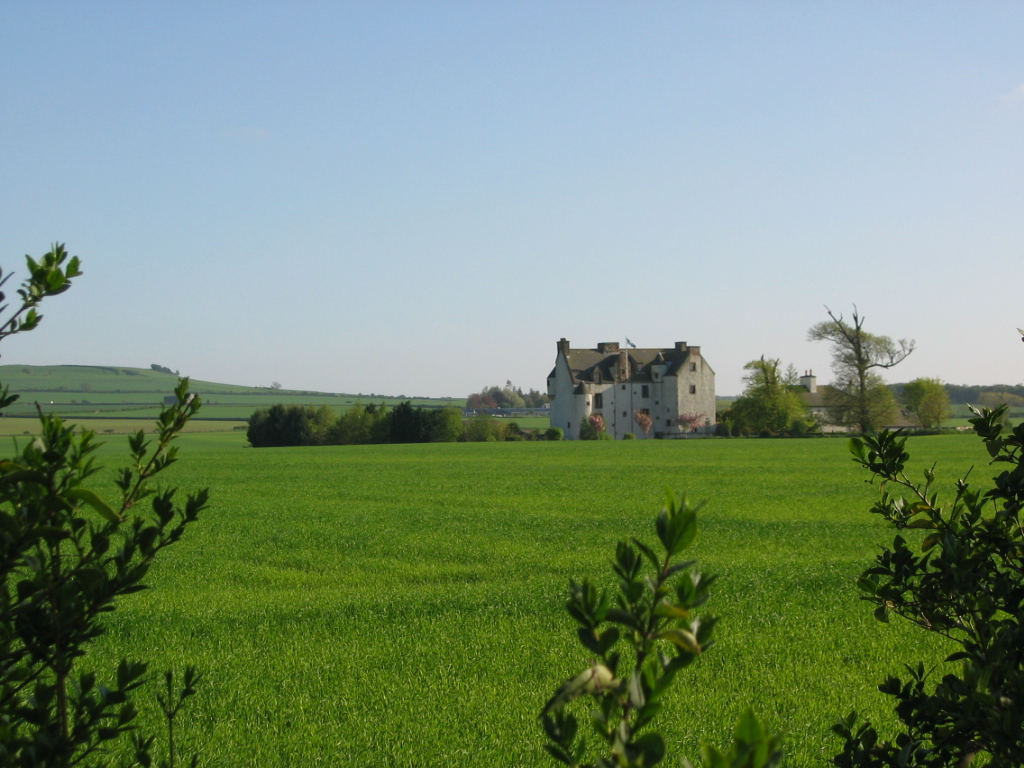
Ballencrieff Castle, Gideon Murray's East Lothian home

In June 1614 he wrote to the king about silver mines in Scotland at Hilderston which were now yielding metal. In March 1615 he was made keeper of the Scottish crown jewels, known as the Honours of Scotland, which he received from John Arnot of Birswick, Provost of Edinburgh. The condition of the crown and sword were recorded.

To help finance the visit of King James to Scotland in 1617, Murray borrowed money from William Dick, a merchant burgess of Edinburgh, and the advocate Alexander Morrison. He repaid them through tax receipts. A further sum was sent from England, including some money from the privy purse. Preparations for the royal visit included repairs at Linlithgow Palace, the palace block at Edinburgh Castle, works at Stirling Castle, and fireworks at Edinburgh Castle and the masque and morris dance at Holyrood Palace on the king's birthday, 19 June. King James gave particular instructions for the chapel in Holyroodhouse, and encouraged Gideon Murray to contract the London stonemason Nicholas Stone to design and supervise the decoration.

In 1618 King James gave a gold basin which the burgh of Edinburgh had given to him the year before, with two gilt cups, one in the form of a salmon, from the burgh of Glasgow, a gold cup presented by Carlisle, with some valuable musk and ambergris, and an iron chest that had belonged to the Earl of Gowrie.

In June 1620 he explained how a ban on the circulation of foreign coins in Scotland had damaged the economy.

In 1621 James Stewart, Lord Ochiltree accused Murray of misusing public money, and this brought about a nervous breakdown and his death on 28 June 1621.

He was buried at Holyrood Abbey in Edinburgh. After his death the crown, sceptre and sword of state, known collectively as the Honours of Scotland, and formerly in his keeping, with the silver plate and dornick and damask table linen used in 1617, were examined by the Privy Council at the royal mint in Edinburgh and found to be in good order.

== Castles, towers, and gardens ==
Murray owned the estate of Glenpoit east of Walkerburn on the River Tweed, and in 1594 he acquired the adjacent estate of Elibank from the Douglas family and constructed a fortified house on the site. Elibank Tower was sited on the Eliburn stream near Walkerburn. The L-shaped building had two towers and two terraced gardens to the south and west, described as Italianate in inspiration. Murray also had a lodging in Edinburgh and another border home at Langshaw where there was another terraced garden. Other courtiers who remained as officers in the administration of Scotland after 1603 also made substantial gardens, including Alexander Seton at Pinkie and Fyvie, and George Foulis at Ravelston.

At Ballencreiff in East Lothian, the hall ceiling had plaster ciphers of "SGM" and "DMP" for Sir Gideon Murray and his wife Dame Margaret Pentland, and the fetterlock and stars (mullets) from his heraldry.

The satirist Anthony Weldon listed Murray as a Scottish courtier who deservedly received rewards from King James, among "private gentlemen; as Gideon Murray, John Achmoty, James Baily, John Gib, and Barnard Lindley, got some pretty estate, not worth either the naming or enjoying; old servants should get some moderate estate to leave to posterity".

== Marriage and children ==
The children of Gideon Murray and Margaret Pentland included:

- Patrick Murray, Lord Elibank, who married in 1617 Elizabeth Dundas, a daughter of James Dundas of Arniston.
- Agnes Murray, who married Sir Walter Scott of Harden in 1611. She became known as Muckle Mouthed Meg.
- Walter Murray of Livingstone (d. 1659), who married Elizabeth Pringle.
- William Murray, who was made Commissioner of the Customs in Scotland on 23 October 1618, at the same time his father was given silver plate previously gifted to the king.
