= Patrick Murray, 1st Lord Elibank =

Scottish peer

Patrick Murray, 1st Lord Elibank (? - 12 November 1649) was a Scottish peer.

== Career ==
Murray was a son of Sir Gideon Murray of Elibank and Margaret Pentland. In 1628, he was created a Baronet, of Elibank in the County of Selkirk, in the Baronetage of Nova Scotia, and, in 1643, he was created Lord Elibank, of Ettrick Forest in Selkirkshire, in the Peerage of Scotland, with remainder to his heirs male whatsoever. Lord Elibank was one of the six peers who opposed the extradition of King Charles I to the English Parliament. The family, although originally from Peeblesshire, resided at Livingston Peel near Livingston Village.

Murray died on 12 November 1649.

== Marriages ==
His first wife was Margaret Hamilton, a daughter of Alexander Hamilton of Innerwick. His second wife was Elizabeth Dundas, a daughter of James Dundas of Arniston. Their children included his heir, Patrick Murray, 2nd Lord Elibank (see below). His third wife was Helen Lindsay, a daughter of Bernard Lindsay of King's Wark, Creig, and Lochhill. His fourth wife was Agnes Nicolson, a daughter of Thomas Nicolson of Cockburnspath.

== Patrick Murray, 2nd Lord Elibank ==
Patrick Murray (1632–1671) married Elizabeth Stewart, daughter of John Stewart, 1st Earl of Traquair.

He was a pioneer of botany and a good friend of Scotland's premier botanist and physician, Sir Robert Sibbald and Sir Andrew Balfour. His garden was known as "the curious garden" and contained over 1000 plants assembled from his travels across Scotland and from seeds posted to him from foreign contacts. It was said to be an Italian style water garden fed by the waters of the nearby Folly Burn.

Inspired by the descriptions of his well-travelled friends Sibbald and Balfour he began a grand tour on 2 September 1668. He visited many gardens, waterways and canals including The King's Garden in Paris which he described as "the most complete that is in the world".

Sadly he never returned to put his new ideas to the test. En route to Italy he died in Avignon, France in early September 1671.

Balfour and Sibbald on hearing of his death travelled to Livingston Peel and organised transportation of the huge plant collection to Edinburgh, to a site now occupied by Waverley Station and shortly, in 1763, to a new site on Leith Walk.

== Notes ==
Peerage of Scotland
New creation	Lord Elibank; 1643–1649	Succeeded by Patrick Murray
Baronetage of Nova Scotia
New creation	Baronet (of Elibank); 1628–1649	Succeeded by Patrick Murray
