= Walkerburn =

Coordinates: 55.633333°N 3.016667°W

Walkerburn: Scottish Gaelic: Allt an Fhùcadair
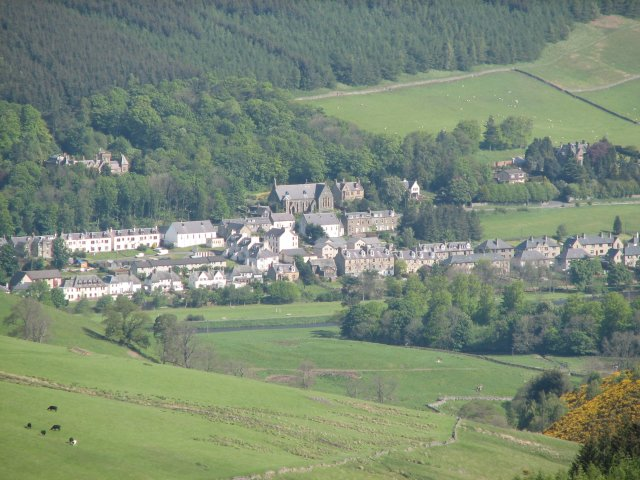
- Walkerburn, seen from Minch Moor

- Location within the Scottish Borders
- Population: 740 (2020)
- Council area: Scottish Borders
- Country: Scotland
- Sovereign state: United Kingdom
- Post town: WALKERBURN
- Postcode district: EH43
- Dialling code: 01896
- Police: Scotland
- Fire: Scottish
- Ambulance: Scottish

Walkerburn (Scottish Gaelic: Allt an Fhùcadair) is a small village in the Scottish Borders area of Scotland, on the A72 about 8 miles (13 km) from Peebles and 10 miles (16 km) from Galashiels.

It was founded in 1854 to house the workers for the tweed mills owned by the Ballantyne family. It is the home of the Ballantyne Memorial Institute.

The village also unusually houses a small number of science-based industries and many successful small enterprises. It boasts Scotland's first hydro electric scheme.

Walkerburn has a population of around 740.

== History ==
=== Early history ===
There is evidence of settlers around the Walker Burn as far back as the Bronze Age because burnt mounds have been identified at Glenmead and on the Plora Burn to the south of the village. The mounds are evidence that people once heated stones in these areas that were then used to heat water.

The remains of an Iron Age Hill Fort can be seen on Bold Rig and it is easy to see why this spot was picked for a defensive position with its excellent views over the valley to the north. This fort measured approx 220 ft by around 140 ft.

Although the Romans conquered Tweeddale, they do not appear to have settled it and there are no great Roman roads or buildings in the area. Vestiges of Roman camps exist near Lyne Church, west of Peebles, and at Innerleithen. On Tower Knowe there are the remains of what is thought to be the Roman road that led from Newstead to Peebles. This would tie in with the Roman Camp outside Innerleithen and there might be some connection with the terraces on Purvis Hill. Maybe there was a settlement of Romanised Britons around the Walker Burn or at least local people who settled and farmed perhaps to feed the legionaries in the camp at Innerleithen. The terraces themselves are something of a mystery. It is not certain whether they were cultivation terraces or built as a form of theatre seating up the hillside. There has never been an excavation in this area so little is known about the people who built the terraces, whether from Roman times or Anglo Saxons. Towards Galashiels, at Kill Brae, there are more terraces and signs of an old settlement.

During the 9th century, the Britons of Tweeddale, in common with those of Strathclyde, felt severe pressures from the Irish Scots on the west, and the Saxons on the east. After the kingdom of Cambria was overthrown by the Scottish king in 974, many Irish Scots settled in this area followed by settlers from Northumbria as the Saxons gained ascendancy.

To the north of the village, past the steading of the ‘new’ Caberston Farm lies the ruined cottage at Priesthope. Old records suggest that there was a substantial farm in this area but where the name came from is still a mystery. Hollewell, which became Holylee, the estate and house to the east of the village, is another name which suggests a religious connection, perhaps to a holy well. This name appears in records back to 1455 and refers to land reserved for the King's sport. James IV leased the land for £26 per year from the Crichton family and may have had the first house built, probably further up hill than the current house.

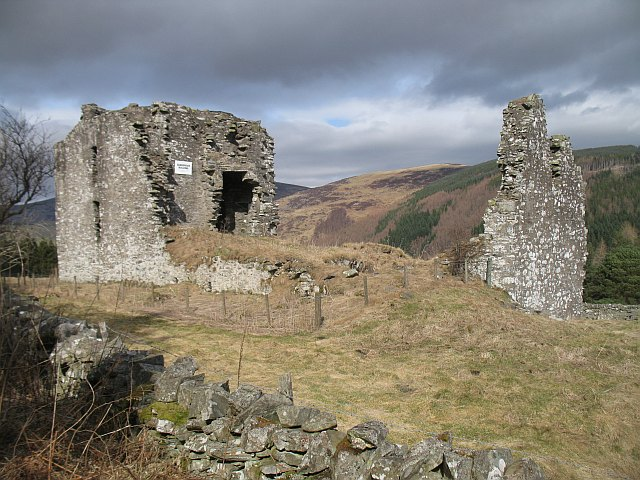
Elibank Tower

The remains of a peel house can still be seen on the hill above the Tweed at Elibank. This tower would have signalled to one at Holylee, which in turn would signal to Scrogbank, to Caberston, to Bold and to Purvis Hill before the signal went on to a similar chain at Innerleithen.

Elibank was the manor of the Murray family, of whom Sir Walter Scott was a descendant. The manor is mentioned in a poem by the Border poet James Hogg called the ‘Fray of Elibank’. Elibank is known for the Elibank forest field archery course which attracts archers from all over the world.

Before the woollen industry expanded in this area during the 1800s the pattern of settlement was that of small farms belonging to large estates, often with absentee landlords. Market gardens supplying the rapidly growing city of Edinburgh abounded and both sheep and cattle farming were profitable.

=== Middle Ages to Great War ===
All through the Middle Ages the production of cloth was a cottage industry in the Tweed valley. The crofter-weaver ran his own sheep, usually on common land, the whole community helped with shearing, the women carded and span the wool and the weaver himself warped and mounted his web and wove it in his handloom. The cloth was afterwards washed and ‘waulked’ or milled and beaten in a burn. Such dyes as were used came from local plants but for the most part the wool was undyed.

Along the banks of the Tweed, especially where burns ran down the hillsides, small groups of these crofter-weavers would be established and it may be that the name ‘Walker Burn’ simply referred to the burn where weavers ‘waulked’ the wool.

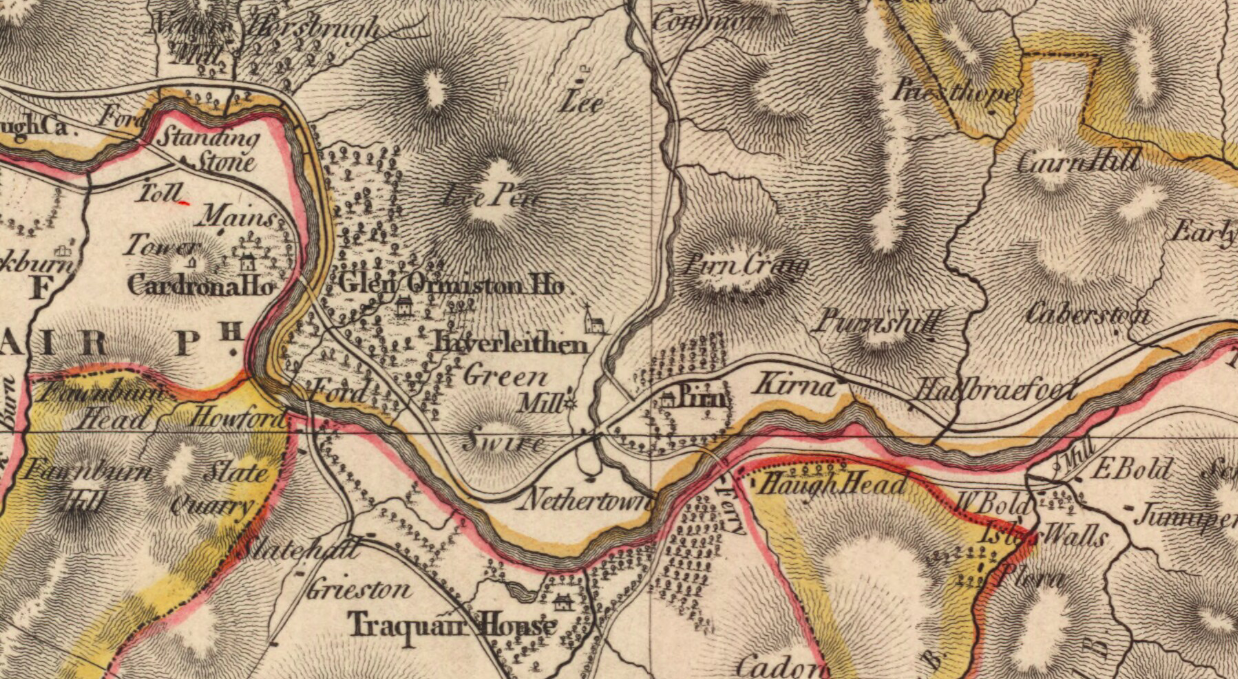
1821 Map of Innerleithen area

The Ballantyne family first appears as landowners and yeoman farmers of Bellenden Farm on the upper Ale Water with the name spelt Bellendaine, then Ballantin and eventually Ballantyne. Later, in 1666, a small colony of weavers in the village of Galashiels had as a member one William Ballantin and in 1672 the birth of his son Walter is the first entry in the baptism record of Galashiels Parish Church. Eventually, a descendant of William and Walter, Henry Ballantyne (1802-1865) rose to prominence as one of the most skillful developers of Tweed cloth. In 1846/7, looking around for a site for a new mill, Henry saw the possibilities of the site where the Walker Burn ran into the Tweed. He entered into negotiations with Thomas Horsburgh to buy a site around the Walker Burn on which to establish a mill to take advantage of a bend on the nearby River Tweed which would make it easy to build a mill lade taking water into the mill controlled by two sluice gates. The only buildings in the area on that side of the Tweed were Caberston farm and steading and 4 farm cottages. On the south side of the Tweed, West Bold Farm was much older and in other ownership – there was no bridge at this point.

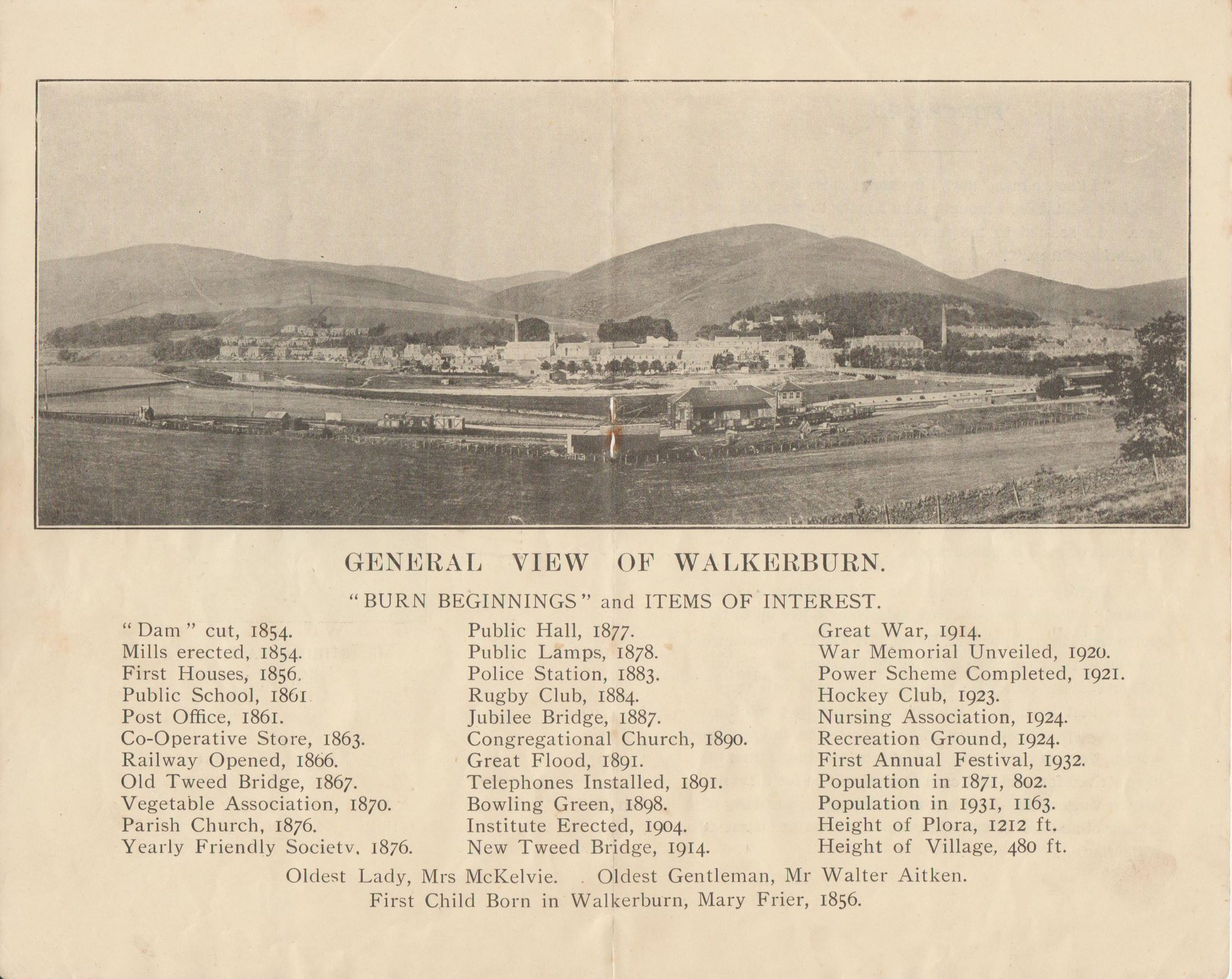
Burn Beginnings & Items of Interest

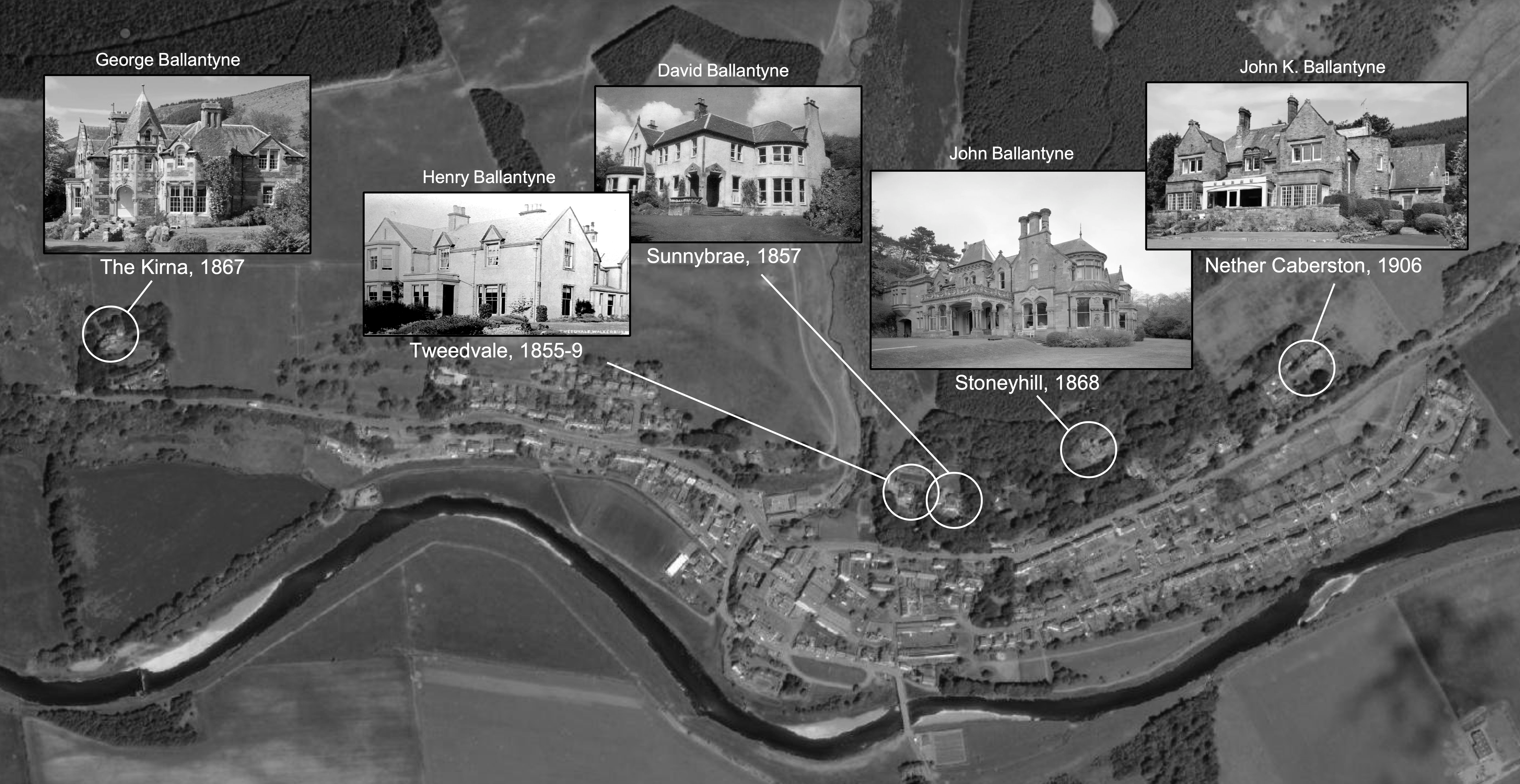
OS Map showing locations of Ballantyne Villas

Work began on the mill and Frederick Thomas Pilkington was retained to design and build villas for the Ballantyne family and 115 houses for mill workers who initially came mainly from Galashiels, walking to and from work – and the working day was typically 14 hours. The blocks of flats at Plora Terrace were the first workers’ home to be built. In 1854 the village was christened Walkerburn after the Waulker Burn which runs from the hills above Priesthope into the Tweed.

The first child was born in the new village in 1856 and the first shops opened in 1858.

Gradually, more and more workers’ houses were built and by 1861 there were enough children to support an elementary school. The arrival of the railway and the opening of a Post Office in 1866 put Walkerburn firmly on the Peeblesshire map as an expanding, energetic mill village. The railway closed in 1962 but the Post Office is still in the original building.

The Parish Church, built in 1875, was followed by a Methodist Chapel and then a Congregational Church in 1890, both now private houses. The Church of Scotland was built in 1883 and the Rugby Club founded in 1884, as the 25th member of the Scottish Rugby Union. And in 1877 the Good Templar Movement built the Public Hall which subsequently passed into community ownership in 1908. The Hall is now maintained as a charitable trust. A French style ‘pissoir’ was installed as a public toilet on the A72 beside the bridge over the Walker Burn. It is no longer in use.

By 1878, when the first gas street lamps were installed, the population of the village was 1028, growing to 1500 by the turn of the century, and in 1882 the village got its own police station at the foot of Hall Street, which remained in use until a new police house was built opposite the mill gates. Both it and the original police station remain in use, though not by the police. In December 1883 there was the first meeting of the Walkerburn Co-operative Society, which played an active role in village retailing until it merged with the Innerleithen Society in 1966 and then with the Borders Society in 1969.

There is still a co-operative store in Innerleithen but the Walkerburn store closed in 1987. Until the 1960s, in addition to the Post Office, Walkerburn had a grocery store, a butcher, baker and greengrocer, a chemist, a jeweler, a tailor, a haberdasher, a general clothes shop and a knitwear and dressmaking shop, two fish and chip shops, two hairdressers, a library, a boot repair shop, several sweetie shops, and numerous small shops run in people's front rooms.

The first foot bridge was built across the Tweed, where the bridge is today, in 1867. Until that time, passengers for the new station had to be ferried across for a year. This was replaced by a girder bridge in 1914. This new bridge was something of a revolution in Walkerburn as it carried not only foot passengers but also vehicles. So a journey with a horse and cart or motor vehicle did not have to go via Innerleithen (where there was a bridge) or over the Bold Ford, which was sometimes impassable due to flooding of the Tweed.

In 1904 David Ballantyne built the Henry Ballantyne Memorial Institute in memory of his father. The Institute was built in red Dumfriesshire sandstone, next to the Tweed Bridge, to provide education and entertainment for mill workers and their families. The Institute was endowed with £32,000 and its management handed over to a committee of local men. It remained in the trust of the Ballantyne family until 2000 when it was donated to the village. Known to villagers as the ‘HB Club’, it is still in existence providing a bar and entertainment for the community.

By the outbreak of The Great War, the population of the village had risen to 1279 and two Ballantyne mills were in operation. Scotch Tweed had established itself worldwide.

=== 1914-1918, The Great War, Tartan, Khaki and Flannel ===
The young men joined the Army, the old men and women ran the mill producing 10,000 yards of tartan per week plus khaki flannel for the Army. Walkerburn had the highest casualty rate as a percentage of its population of any settlement in Scotland but the mill owners and the community looked after the many widows and children. Post war, the textile trade boomed and in 1920 a hostel was built on Park Avenue to house female workers recruited from outside the village. This is now single persons’ flats.

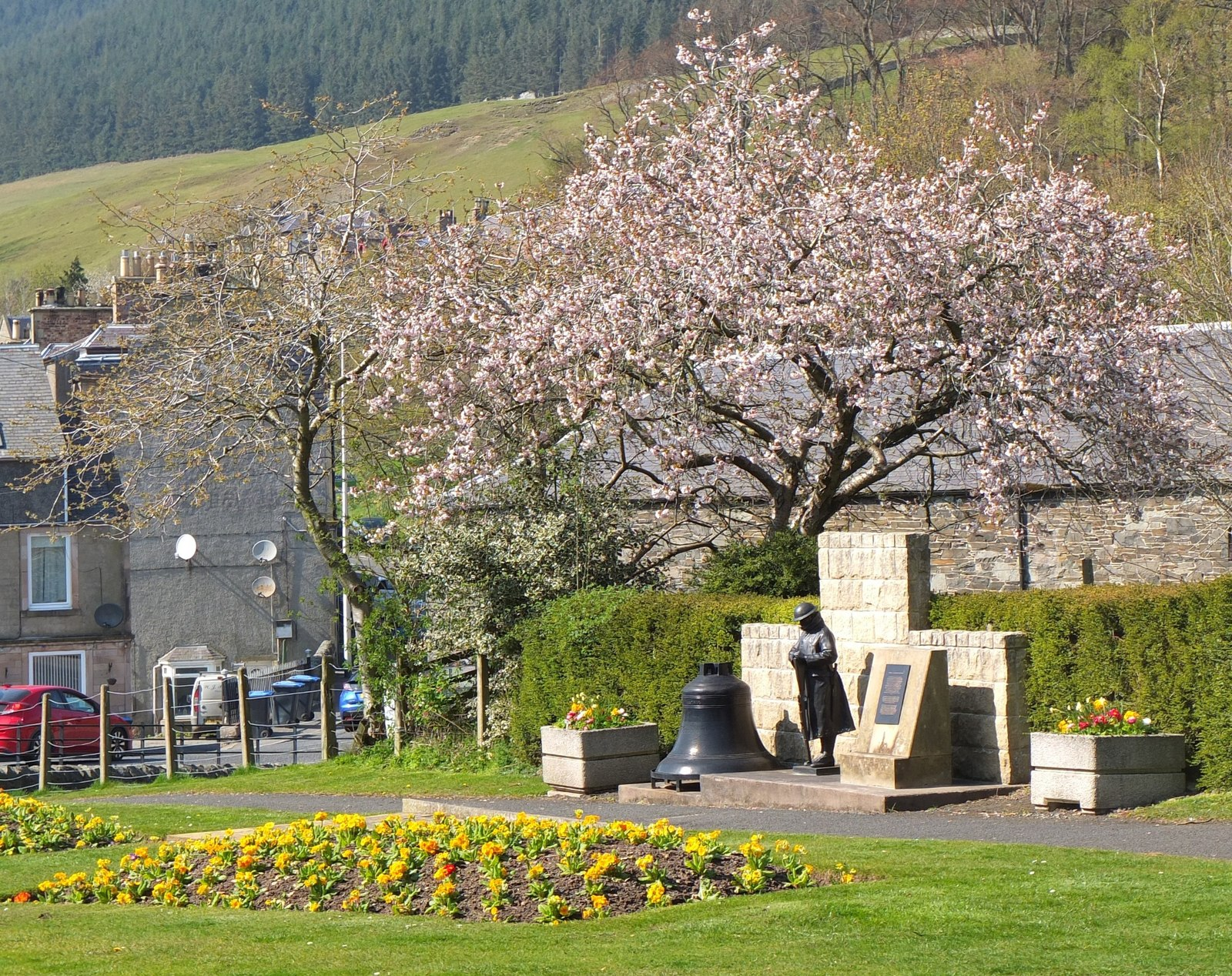
War Memorial, Walkerburn

In 1920 the War Memorial was built by public subscription. A full sized figure was planned but lack of funds led to a cut down figure being sculpted. In August 1998 the statue was stolen, perhaps to order, and another fund raising effort was made to replace it. Enough money was raised for a full size figure, produced by Beltane Studios in Peebles, which was installed in at a service on 20 September 1999, held in heavy rain in the presence of the Princess Royal. In 2000 two policemen spotted the old statue beside a cut in the perimeter fence at Edinburgh Airport. After much discussion, the old statue was placed alongside the Mill bell in a small garden opposite the site of the main mill buildings on the A72.

=== 1920-1921, The Hydro Electric Scheme ===
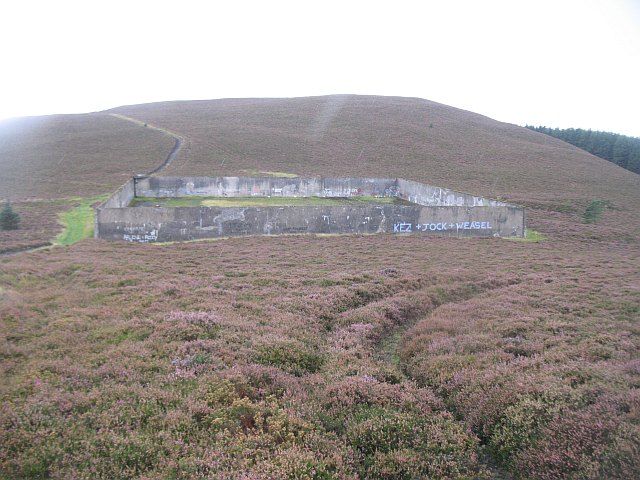
Reservoir at Kirnie Law

Initially the mill lade produced enough power for the mills but as production expanded more cheap energy was needed. In 1920 Messrs Boving & Co of London were asked to examine the possibility of setting up a better system of using water power from the Tweed to supply the mills.

The first step was to make the lade more effective, and this was done by creating a greater and deeper fall, but this wasn't enough. Also, at night, the lade system produced power which was wasted. The revolutionary solution was to build a huge reservoir in the hills and to use the surplus power to pump water from the Tweed up to the reservoir. The next stage was to bring the water back down to drive a Pelton turbine to produce more power.

A ferro-concrete reservoir was built on Kirnie Law connected to the power house by a 9" pipe. A funicular railway was built from the A72 up to the reservoir site to haul up all the materials used in construction – a total weight of 3,650 tons was carried on the railway.

As production in the mills declined, less power was required. The system was dismantled and all that is left is the old reservoir.

=== 1920s and 1930s, The Boom and Bust Years, Charleston and Jitterbug ===
The school leaving age was raised to 14 – no more children going to work in the Mill at 11, or even younger. The Depression hit the wool trade and there were bleak years when only one loom ran but then there were also boom years when all 98 looms worked flat out. Wages rose and fell accordingly. There was a cinema in the Public Hall where silent films were shown to the tinkling of a piano and the serial was very popular. Sometimes, the projectionist went to the George Hotel in the interval and the films were then shown upside down. Dances and the Club Balls were well attended and always started with the Grand March.

Walkerburn wages were never high but the work was dependable from age 14 to retirement and the Mill owners paternalistic, looking after workers who were sick and providing more and more recreation activities as working hours were slowly cut and leisure time increased. In a new park beside the river there were two tennis courts, a swing park and a putting green. Only the swing park survives! And in 1929 the local authority began to provide public housing in Walkerburn as more and more families sought a higher level of accommodation.

In 1932 the first village Summer Festival for the children was held with a football match against Innerleithen school for the ‘Paul Cup’. The festival still takes place over the last week of the school year in June and the Paul Cup is as hotly contested as ever.

=== 1939-1945, Another War, More Tartan ===
Twelve Walkerburn men lost their lives in the service of their country in World War 2. Soldiers were billeted in the old wool store in Park Avenue (the new houses), in the Hostel in Park Avenue (the block of flats) and with families. The young men came from Glasgow in 157 Field Ambulance and from Yorkshire in 68 Field Regiment. And several new brides eventually left the village!

The officers lived in Stoneyhill throughout the war, the soldiers’ canteen was run by the ladies of the village in the old darning shed. Sandy Russell, the chemist, won the Irish Sweepstake and threw a magnificent ball in Innerleithen for all the troops in the area and in 1941 the local Home Guard and Fire Service turned out as the Mill Wool Store burned down.

The British Restaurant run in the Mill canteen provided food for the poor of the village as well as mill workers. Those with cars, and petrol, ran a ‘get you home’ service for village men in the Forces coming home on leave and met them off trains and buses in Edinburgh and Symington. The Women's Voluntary Service established a unit in the village and ran not only the canteen but also many events to keep everyone entertained and help the war effort.

=== 1950s, You’ve never had it so good… ===
Walkerburn Mill employed some of the large numbers of Poles, Ukrainians and other Eastern European displaced persons who came to work here in the 1940s. And another type of ‘refugee’ arrived – people displaced from Glasgow as the slums were cleared. The culture shock of moving to a mill village from the big city was too much for some but many stayed. New houses were built along Tweedholm Avenue. New clubs sprang up. Car ownership began slowly to spread and 1954 saw great celebrations for the 100th anniversary of the village.

And around the area the new Forestry Commission was buying up land and block planting Sitka spruce. The ‘Swedish’ houses at Glenbenna were built to house forestry workers and forest work became an alternative to employment in the mill. Over the next 30 years the landscape was transformed by the dark coniferous forest but eventually changes in forest practice led to a reappraisal of the planting policy which should mean that as the dark forest is harvested new planting will be mixed close to roads and habitations.

=== 1960s and 1970s, The Slow Decline ===
By 1961, when the railway closed, the population had dropped to 863, shops were beginning to struggle and close and although local people could still depend on the mill for jobs, wages were not keeping pace with inflation. Ballantyne's amalgamated into Scottish Worsteds & Woollens in 1968 and then in 1980, the remaining mill was bought by Dawson International. At first Walkerburn reaped the benefit of mill closures elsewhere in the Borders but in 1988 Dawson pulled out and the last mill closed. That was the end of Walkerburn as a mill village. New industries such as Rathburn Chemicals (1975) started up and expanded. It took time, as the village struggled with high unemployment and depressed house prices, but Walkerburn slowly regenerated.

=== Into the 21st Century ===
With help from the European Union, Scottish Enterprise and Scottish Borders Council, villagers formed the WAVE Group bringing together all the village clubs, societies and individuals to look at future regeneration. Burning Issues was founded as a monthly village newsletter and the Walkerburn and Innerleithen Partnership was formed to make the most of European regeneration funding. The Community Council was reinvigorated and a new Community Development Trust took shape. The Pathway Group re-built Alexandra Park with new equipment in the swing park, a wildlife hedge, tree planting and walkways. The Public Hall was renovated and extended just in time to provide a home for a village Healthy Living initiative which provides exercise and dance classes and healthy cooking classes for all ages.

The Development Trust started to look at the feasibility of further extending the walking, riding and biking trails around the village, developing Walkerburn as a new focal point for tourism in the Tweed Valley. Over 80 households in the village signed up to a home composting scheme, village clean-ups and community events were again well supported, house prices started to rise and new homes were built on gap sites.

== Other ==
=== The Myth of Muckle Mou'd Meg ===
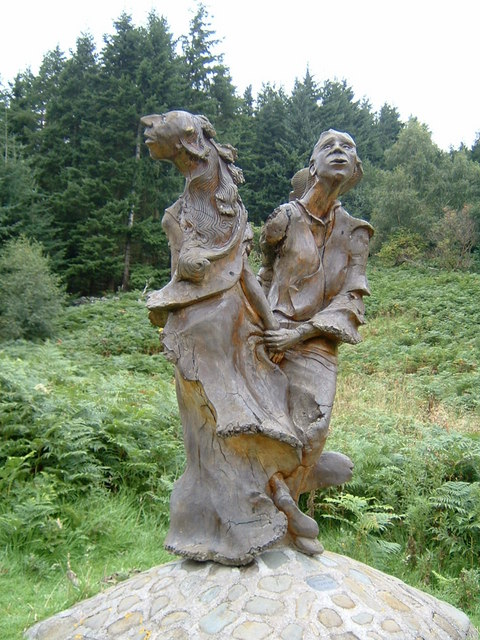
Muckle Mou'd Meg

The Scotts and Murrays were ancient enemies; and as their lands were adjoining at many points, they had many opportunities of exercising their enmity "according to the custom of the Marches." In the seventeenth century much of the property lying upon the river Ettrick belonged to Scott of Harden, who made his principal residence at Oakwood Tower, a Border house of strength still remaining upon that river. William Scott (afterwards Sir William), son of the head of this family, undertook an expedition against the Murrays of Elibank, whose property was a few miles distant. He found his enemy upon their guard, was defeated, and made prisoner in the act of driving off the cattle he had collected for that purpose.

Sir Gideon Murray conducted his prisoner to the castle, upon enquiry from his wife as to the fate of his prisoner, he is reputed to have said: "The gallows, to the gallows with the marauder." "Hout, na, Sir Gideon," answered the considerate matron, in her vernacular idiom; "would you hang the winsome young laird of Harden when you have three ill-favoured daughters to marry?" "Right," answered the baron, "he shall marry our daughter, Muckle-mouthed Meg, or strap for it." Upon this alternative being proposed to the prisoner, he upon the first view of the case stoutly preferred the gibbet to "Muckle-mouthed Meg," whose real name was Agnes. But at length, when he was literally led forth to execution, and saw no other chance of escape, he retracted his ungallant resolution, and preferred the typical noose of matrimony to the literal cord of hemp. Such is the tradition established in both families, and often jocularly referred to upon the Borders. It may be necessary to add that Muckle-mouthed Meg and her husband were a happy and loving pair, and had a large family.’

In truth, the marriage contract, which is still in existence, shows that ‘the marriage of young Harden and Agnes Murray, instead of being a hurried business, was arranged very leisurely, and with great care, calmness, and deliberation by all the parties interested, including the two principals, the bridegroom and bride, and the parents on either side. Instead of one contract, as is usual in such cases, there were two separate and successive contracts, made at an interval of several months, before the marriage was finally arranged.’ The first contract bears date at Edinburgh, 18 February 1611. In it young Harden and Agnes Murray agree to solemnise their marriage in the face of Christ's Kirk, within two months and a half after the date of the contract. Stipulations are made in the document for the infeftment, by Walter Scott, of his son and his promised spouse, and their heirs male, in the lands of Harden and other lands belonging to Walter and William Scott; and Sir Gideon Murray on his part becomes bound to pay to William Scott the sum of seven thousand merks as tocher with his daughter. The contract is subscribed by Sir Gideon Murray, William Scott, and ‘Agnes Murray,’ all good signatures. But as Auld Wat of Harden could not write, his subscription is thus given: ‘Walter Scott of Harden, with my hand at the pen, led be the notaries underwritten at my command, becus I can not wryt.’

The marriage however did not take place at the time specified in the contract, a failure which is not accounted for, and a second contract was made at the Provost's Place of Creichtoun, on 14 July 1611, in terms similar to those of the original contract.

The existence and the terms of these two contracts no doubt show that the marriage of young Harden and Agnes Murray was not a hastily settled affair, regulated by a contract ‘executed instantly on the parchment of a drum;’ but it is difficult to believe that a story so minute and circumstantial in its details could have been entirely fictitious. Myths are of slow growth, and have always some fact as a foundation. Sir William Scott died in 1655. The eldest son of ‘Little Sir William’ survived till 1707, and his second son lived three years longer. Sir Walter Scott was born in 1771, and the story must have been in circulation and universally credited long before his day.

Is it not possible and probable that Sir William Scott was ‘handfasted’ to Agnes Murray in some such circumstances as are narrated by his descendant, the poet? And may not the delay in solemnizing the marriage, necessitating the formation of a second contract, have been caused by the reluctance of ‘the handsomest man of his time’ to marry an ill-favoured bride?

Sir William Scott had by Agnes Murray five sons and three daughters. The eldest son, called ‘Little Sir William,’ was knighted by Charles II. immediately after the Restoration. The second was Sir Gideon of Highchester, whose posterity carried on the line of the family. Walter, the third son, called ‘Watty Wudspurs’ (or Mad-spurs), figures characteristically in the ballad of ‘Jamie Telfer.’ He was the ancestor of the Scotts of Raeburn. The fourth son was James of Thirlestaine; and from John of Woll, the fifth son, the family of Woll are descended.

=== Ancient Stones ===
==== The Coot Stone ====
The Coot Stone is a large wedge-shaped rock, with large natural "cup" marks on the upper surface, located a few metres from the south bank of the River Tweed opposite Holylee to the east of Walkerburn. The stone is actually in the river bed and may have marked a crossing point to the Holy Well. The origins of the name are unclear.

==== The Basin Stone ====
This large stone slab measures less than 1.00m square, is about 0.30m thick and can be found at the top of Thornylee Forest, an area of woodland managed by Forest Enterprise. The stone has a distinct hollow or basin in the centre and appears to have been deliberately propped underneath by smaller stones. There is an old Scottish remedy for warts where the afflicted wash the warts in water that has collected in natural stone basins. After washing the warts would disappear. It may be that this was the purpose of the stone.

==== The Cheese Well ====
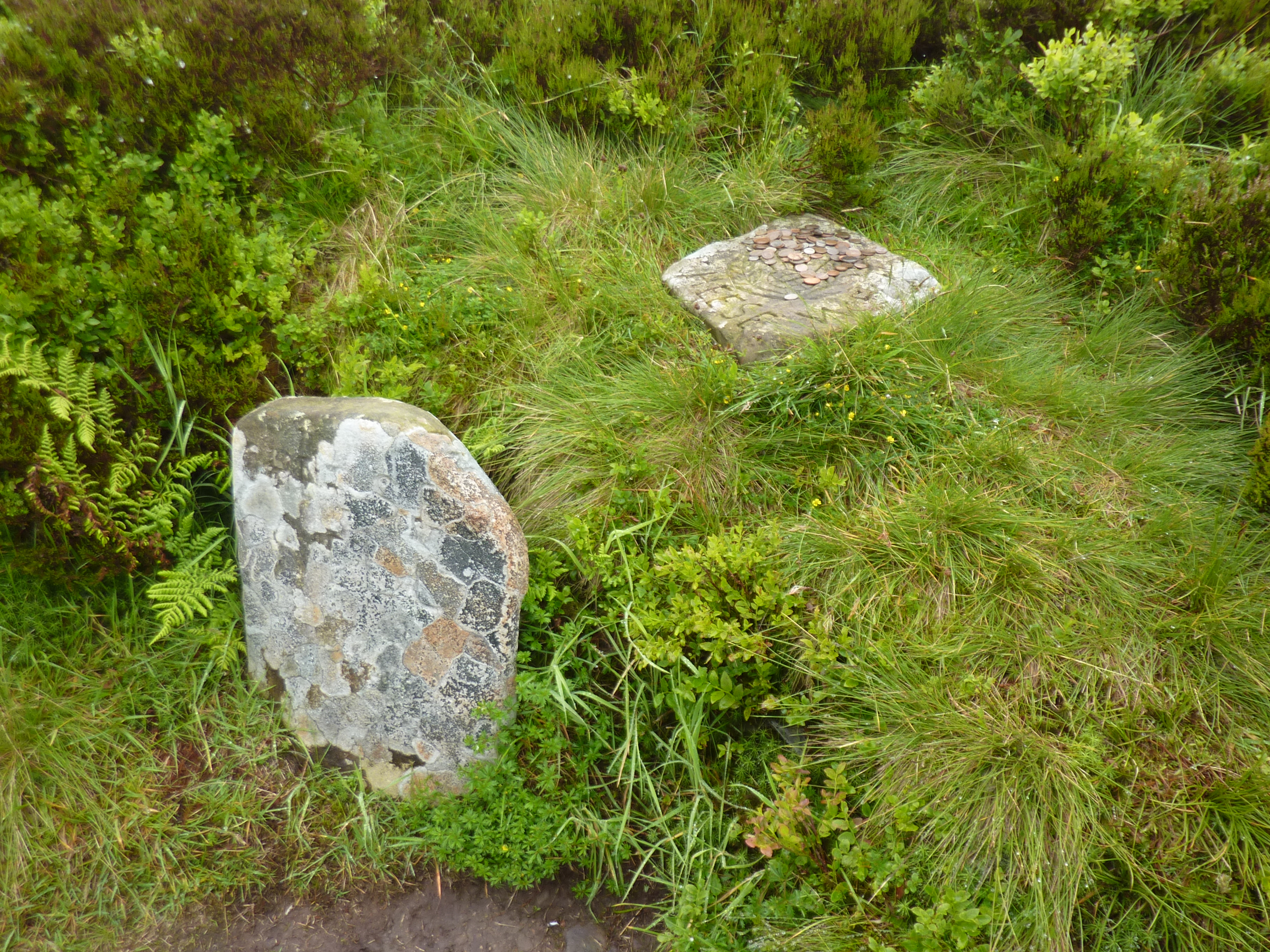
The Cheese Well

Above Walkerburn, on the Southern Upland Way, lies the Cheese Well. Two dressed but well weathered stones mark a small freshwater spring on the old drove road across the Minchmoor between Traquair and Selkirk. One stone, older than the other bears the inscription "Cheese Well". The second stone also bears the same name and is dated 1966. It is said that if you pass the well you should leave an offering, usually cheese, to the Fairies or "Wee Folk" who are supposed to haunt the area. This would ensure a safe and successful journey. The Cheese Well may have been a pagan shrine in the past, whose veneration has fallen to superstition.

=== Flood History ===
Since it was founded, Walkerburn has suffered major flooding of the Tweed river at least ten times, most notably in 2015 on the 5th and 30 December when properties like the Rugby Club, Bowling Club and fishing hut were inundated. The Bowling Club's clubhouse and the newly completed pétanque pitch were under almost 3 feet of water, causing a great deal of damage to the clubhouse, its grass cutting equipment and other contents.

Flash-flooding around the Walker Burn is common. Historical flood records of the Tweed river suggest that flood levels of 17 feet or less generally mean that residential properties in the town are not substantially impacted.

== Gallery ==
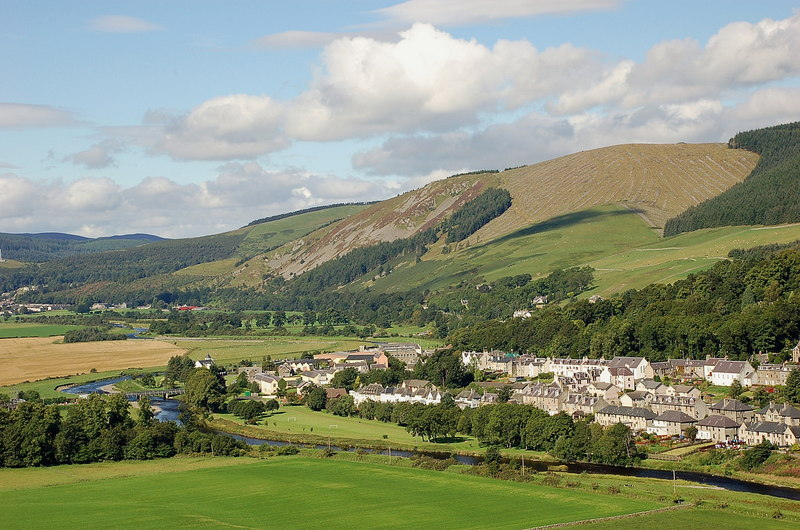
Walkerburn and the Tweed

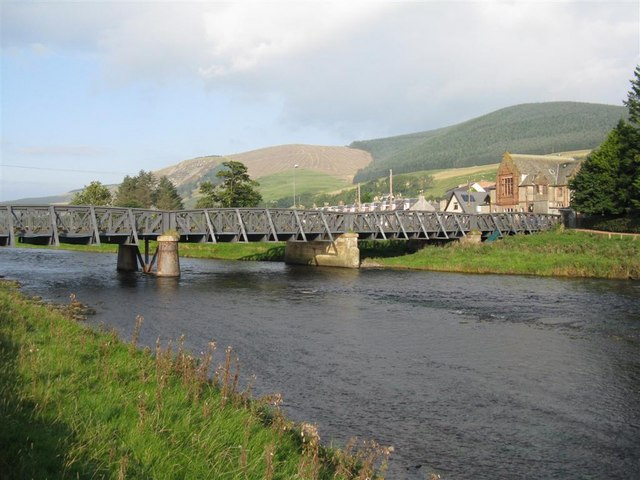
Road bridge over the Tweed and Henry Ballantyne Memorial Institute

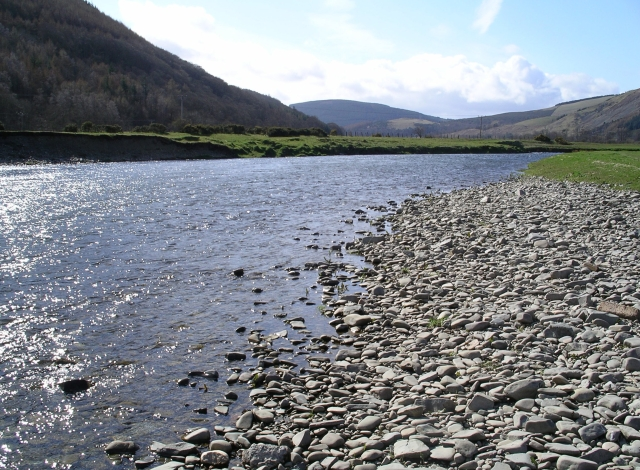
River Tweed, near Walkerburn

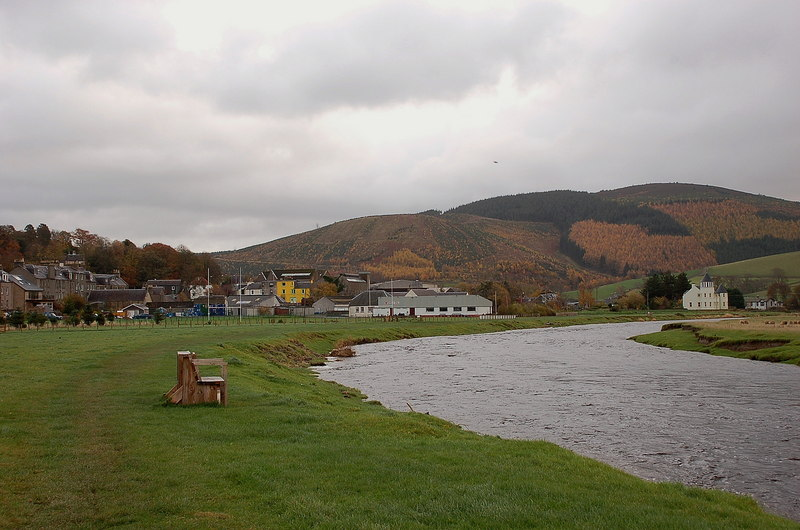
Walkerburn from the west

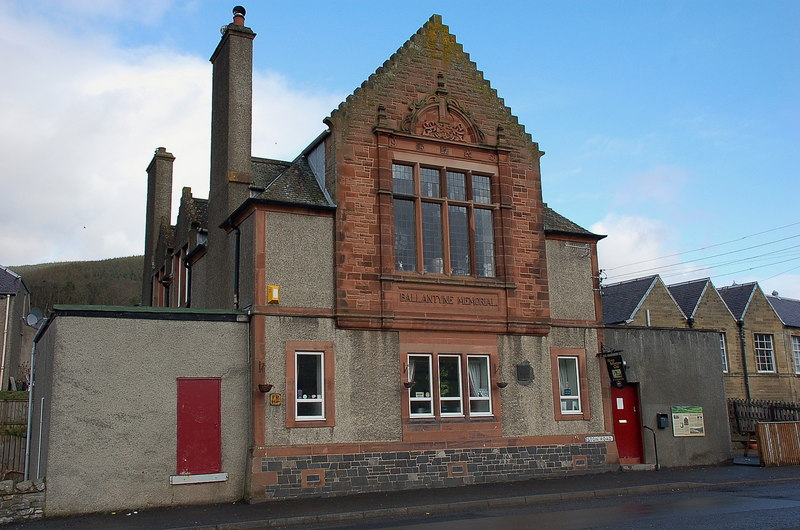
Ballantyne Memorial Institute, Walkerburn

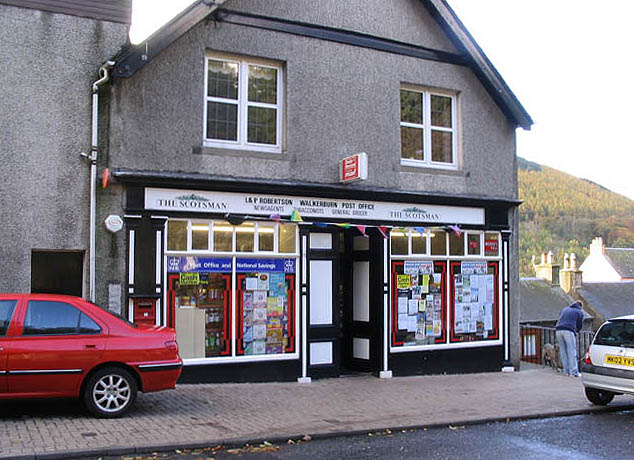
Walkerburn Post Office

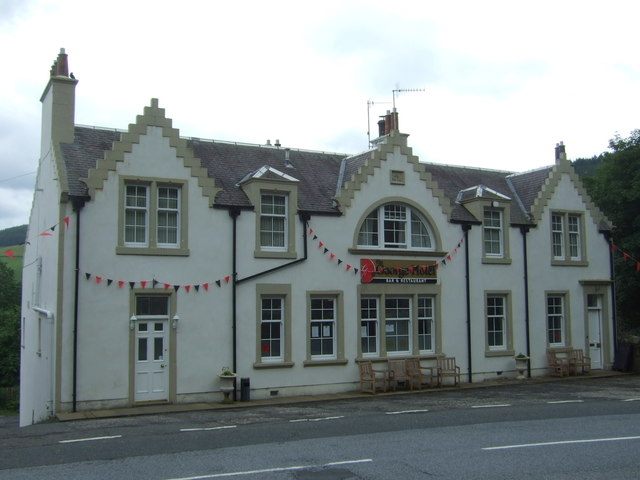
The George Hotel, Walkerburn

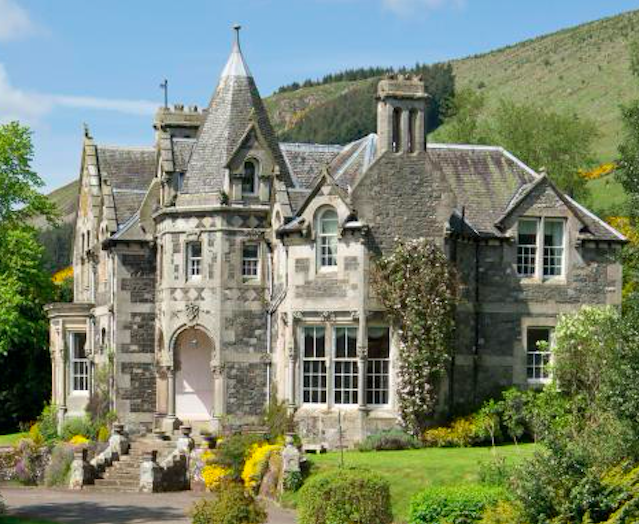
The Kirna (George Ballantyne), Walkerburn est. 1867

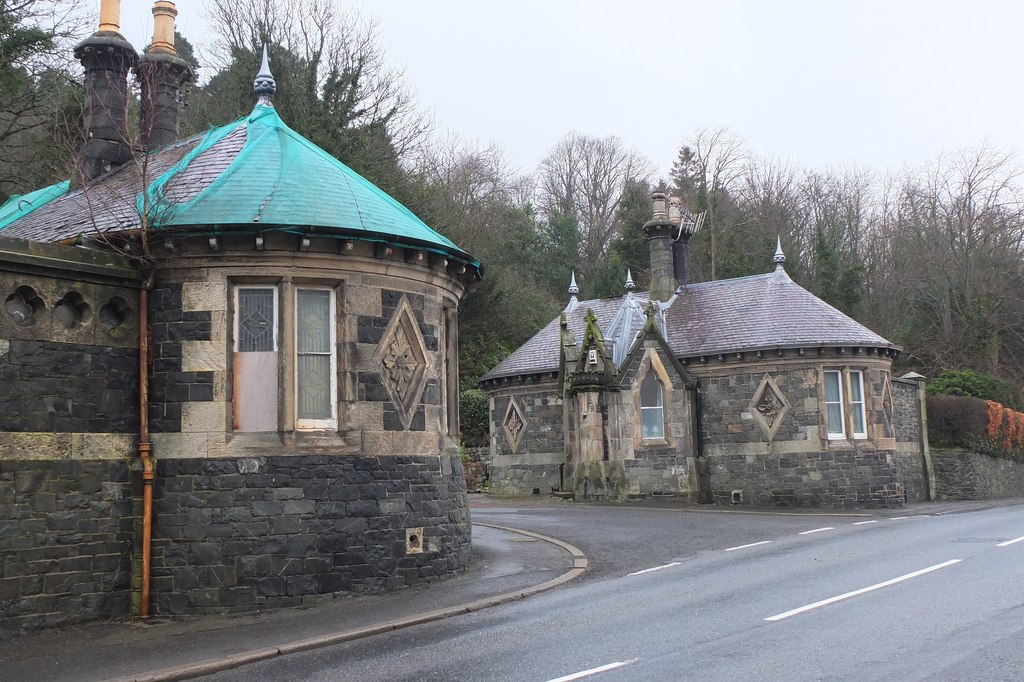
Entrance lodges for Stoneyhill (John Ballantyne), Walkerburn

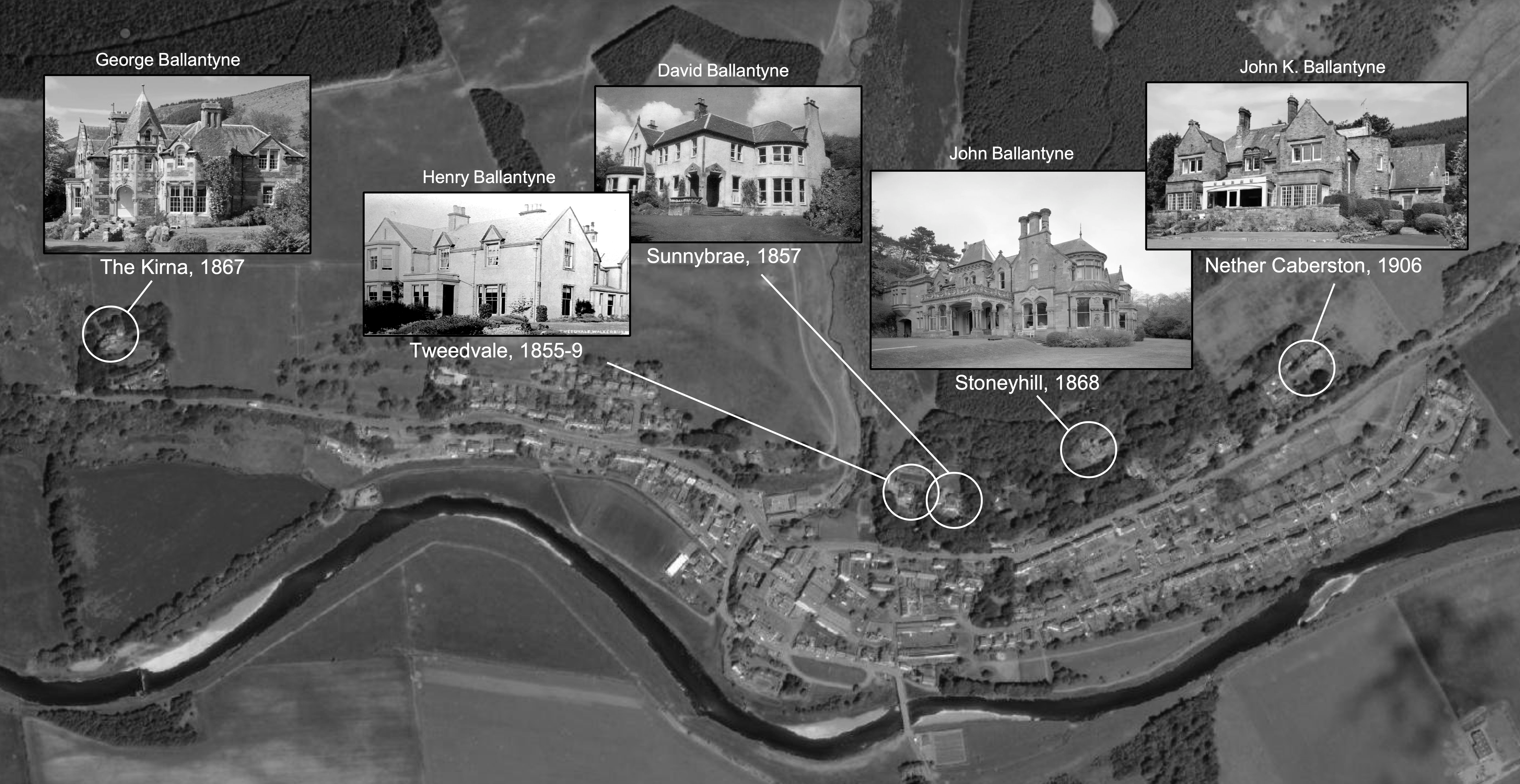
Map showing locations of Ballantyne Villas in Walkerburn

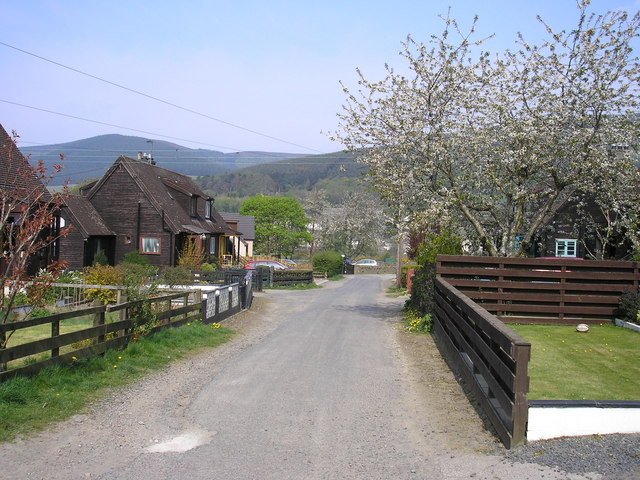
Forestry workers Houses, Glenbenna

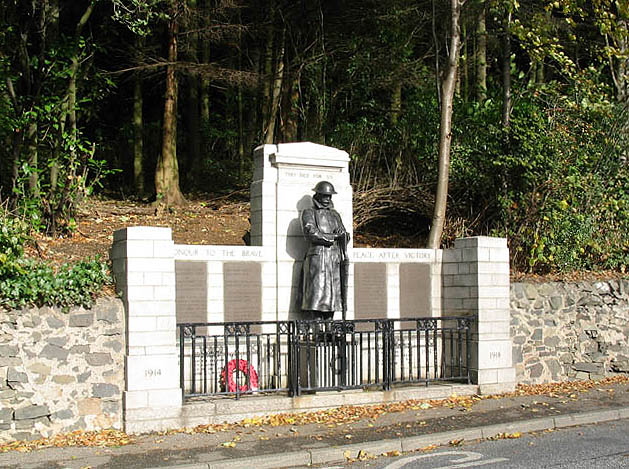
Walkerburn War Memorial

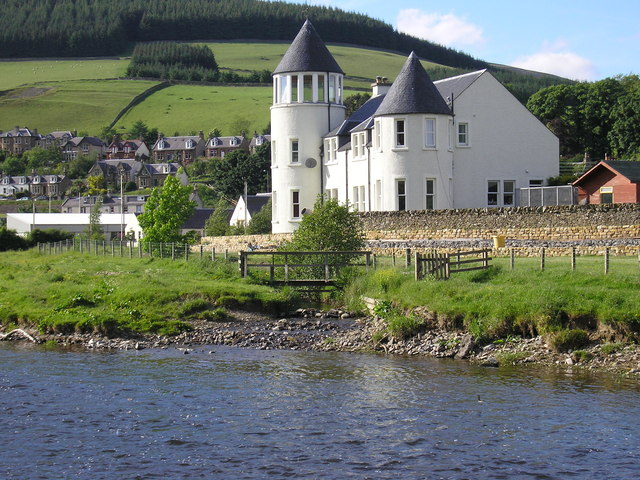
Where the Walker Burn runs into the River Tweed

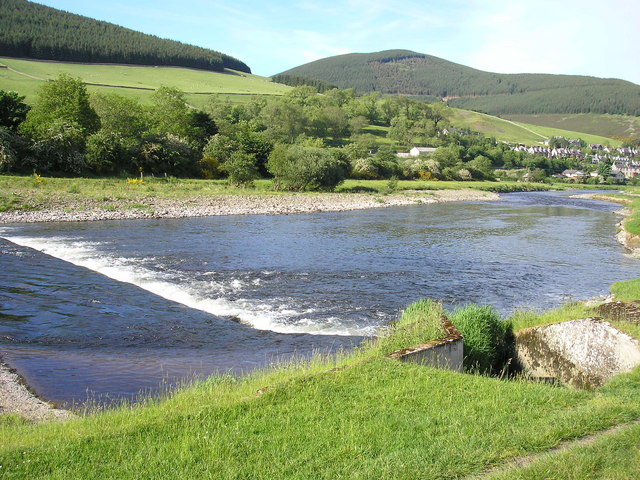
Walkerburn Cauld

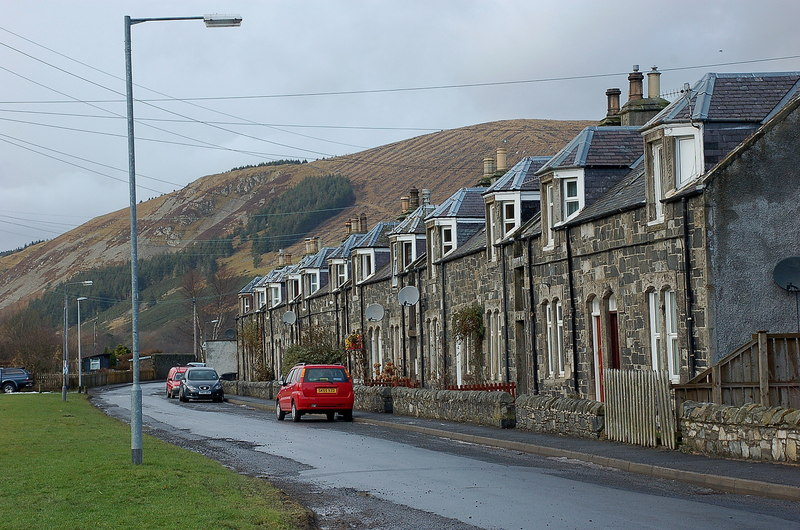
Millworkers' cottages, Walkerburn

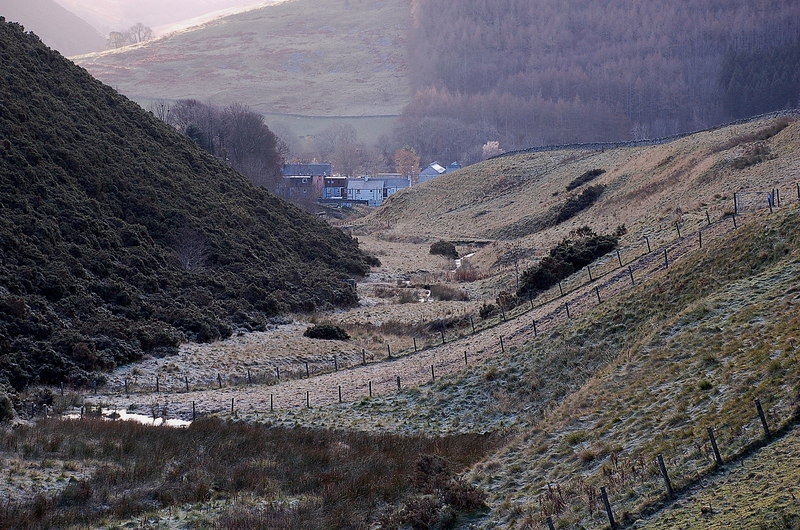
Walker Burn and Walkerburn

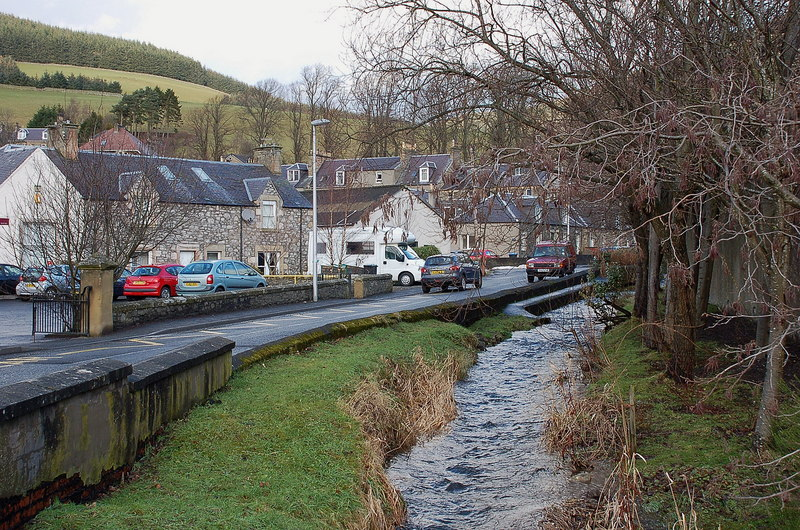
Walker Burn by Caberston Road, Walkerburn

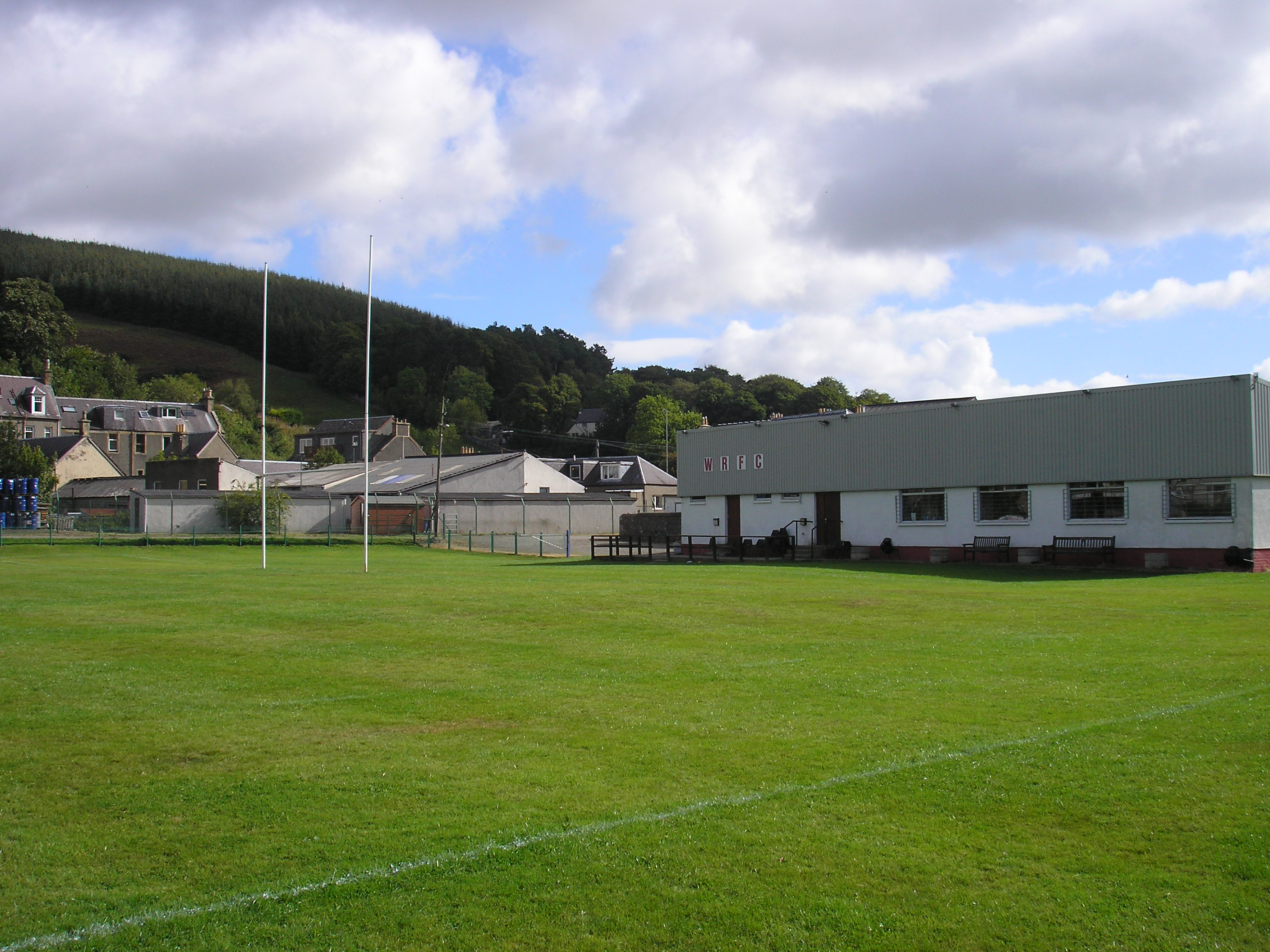
Walkerburn Rugby Football Club

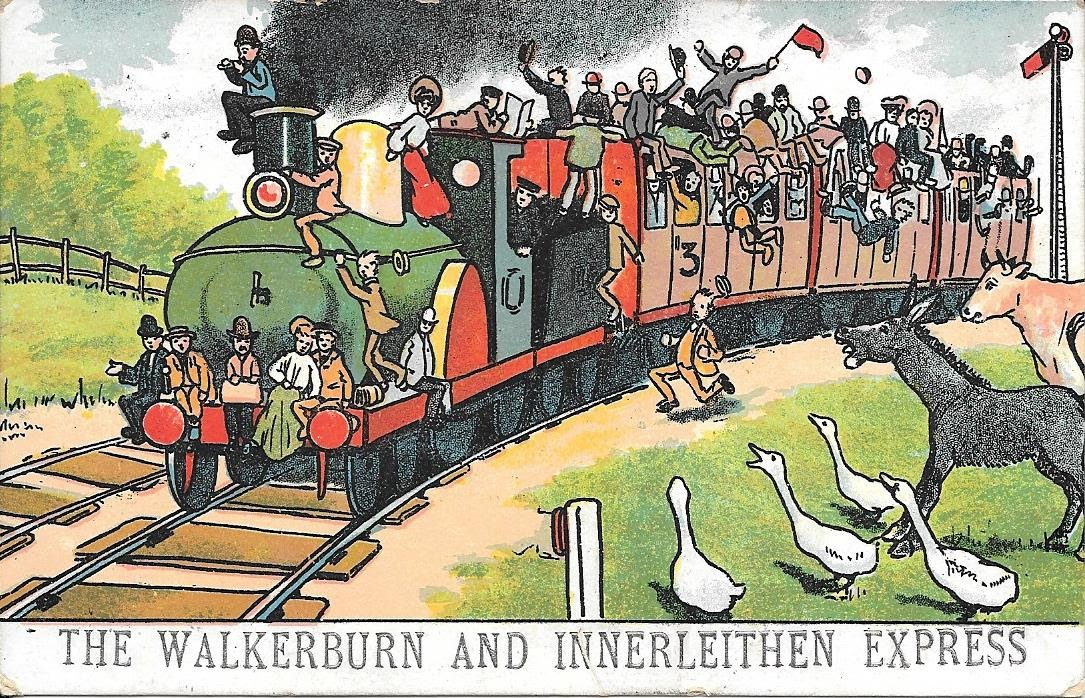
Comic postcard of Walkerburn and Innerleithen Train

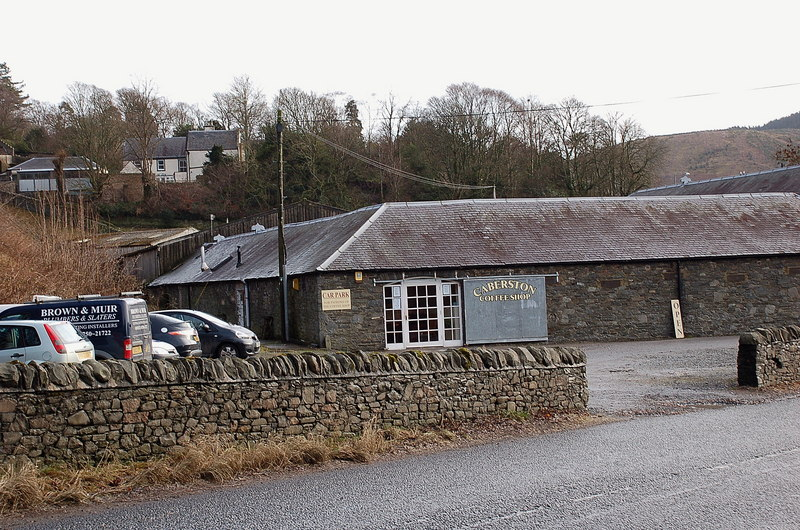
Caberston Coffee Shop, Walkerburn

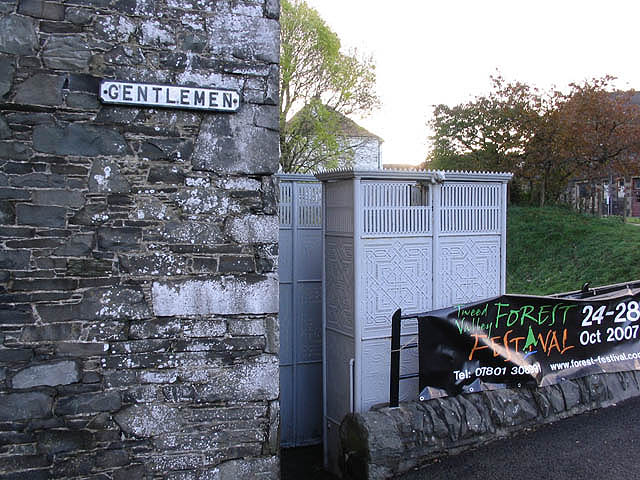
Old urinal in Walkerburn

== See also ==
- List of places in the Scottish Borders
- List of places in Scotland
- The Kirna
