= Branxholme =

Hamlet in Scottish Borders, Scotland

Coordinates: 55.39°N 02.85°W

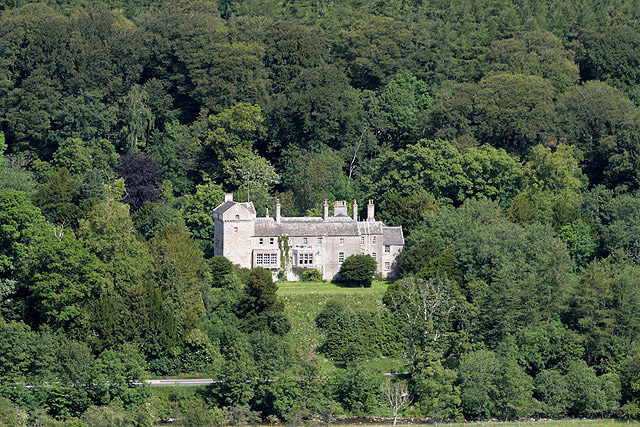
- Branxholme Castle

- Location within the Scottish Borders
- OS grid reference: NT4611
- Council area: Scottish Borders
- Country: Scotland
- Sovereign state: United Kingdom
- Police: Scotland
- Fire: Scottish
- Ambulance: Scottish
- UK Parliament: Berwickshire, Roxburgh and Selkirk
- Scottish Parliament: Ettrick, Roxburgh and Berwickshire

Branxholme is a hamlet in the Scottish Borders area of Scotland, overlooking the River Teviot, 3 miles (5 kilometres) southwest of Hawick, on the A7 road to Langholm.

Nearby are Ale Water, Alemoor Loch, Burnfoot, Borthwick Water, Colterscleugh Monument, Roberton, Stobs Castle, Teviothead and Wilton

== Branxholme Castle ==
The novelist Sir Walter Scott, a close friend and relative of the 4th Duke of Buccleuch, chose Branxholme as the setting for his book The Lay of the Last Minstrel.

The castle had been the hereditary seat of the Scotts of Buccleuch since the 15th century, and it was the centre of power in Upper Teviotdale, on one of the main historic routes south towards England.

The original tower house was burned in 1532 by the Earl of Northumberland, and it was blown up in April 1570 by the Earl of Sussex.

== Branxholme Easter Loch and Wester Loch ==
The Easter Loch lies 2 miles west of Branxholme, and its outlet is the Newmill Burn.

== See also ==
- List of places in the Scottish Borders
- List of places in Scotland
