= Borthwick Water =

River in Scottish Borders, Scotland

Coordinates: 55°25′N 2°50′W

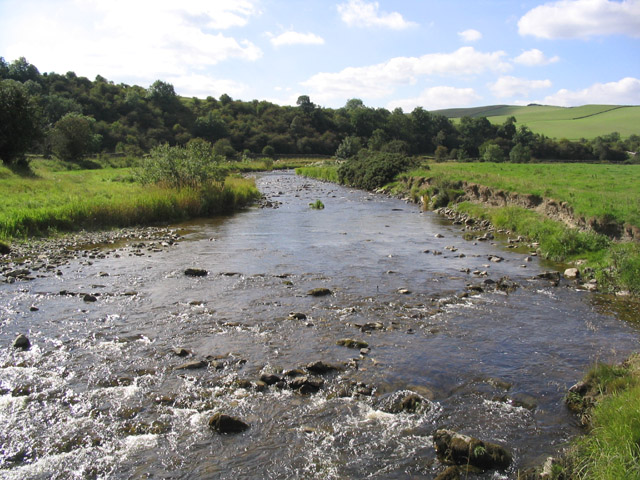
Borthwick Water near Branxholme

The Borthwick Water (Border Scots: Borthwick Witter) is a river in the Scottish Borders area of Scotland, and a tributary of the River Teviot.

The Aithouse Burn, the Howpasley Burn, and the Northhope Burn (amongst others) are some of the feeder burns for what becomes the Borthwick Water at Craik, in the heart of the Craik Forest. The Water continues via Meadshaw, Muselee, and Deanburnhaugh, to Burnfoot and Roberton until it joins the Teviot at Borthaugh and Martinshouse, at the end of the B711, and less than 2 miles from the centre of Hawick.

Places of interest nearby are the Alemoor Loch reservoir and Borthaugh Hill, as well as the villages of Borthwickshiels, Branxholme, Broadhaugh, and Buccleuch.

== See also ==
- List of places in the Scottish Borders
- List of places in Scotland

== Sources ==
- Borthwick Water: two centuries of life in the parish of Roberton by Kathleen W. Stewart, published 1991
- Reminiscences of Borthwick Water sixty years ago by George Scott, 1909 transactions
