= Lilliesleaf =

Village in Scottish Borders, Scotland

Coordinates: 55.5172°N 2.7410°W

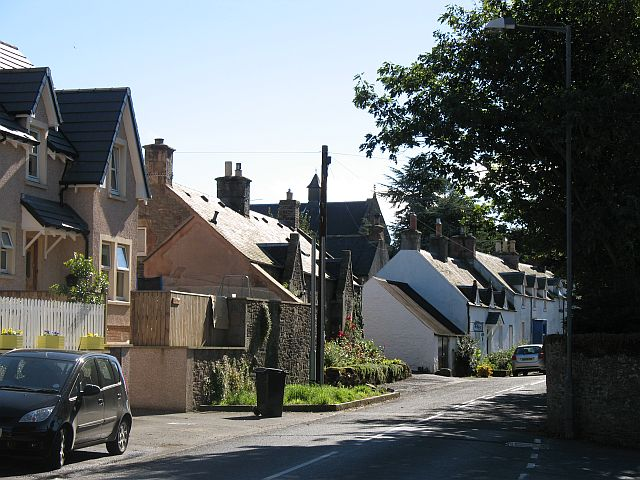
- East end of the main street

- Location within the Scottish Borders
- Population: 365 (2001)
- OS grid reference: NT535252
- Civil parish: Lilliesleaf
- Council area: Scottish Borders
- Lieutenancy area: Roxburgh, Ettrick and Lauderdale
- Country: Scotland
- Sovereign state: United Kingdom
- Post town: MELROSE
- Postcode district: TD6
- Dialling code: 01835
- Police: Scotland
- Fire: Scottish
- Ambulance: Scottish
- UK Parliament: Berwickshire, Roxburgh and Selkirk
- Scottish Parliament: Ettrick, Roxburgh and Berwickshire

Lilliesleaf is a small village and civil parish 7 miles (11 km) south east of Selkirk in the Roxburghshire area of Scottish Borders of Scotland.

Other places nearby include Ancrum, Ashkirk, Belses, Hassendean, Midlem, Minto House, Old Belses, St Boswells, and Woll.

== History ==
Lilliesleaf used to be a village and parish in the northwest of Roxburghshire. On the old rail routes, the village was 3 miles (4.8 km) west of Belses station, 3.5 miles (5.6 km) NNW of Hassendean station, and 6 miles (9.7 km) SSW of Newtown St Boswells station — all on the Waverley Route of the North British railway system, which was closed in 1969.

It was picturesquely situated on a ridge of ground which slopes down first steeply to the village, then gradually to Ale Water. Between the village and the river lie fields and meadows. Lilliesleaf consisted mainly of one long narrow street, half a mile in length, which contained the post office, with money order, savings bank, and telegraph departments, 2 inns, 2 schools, and several good shops. There was a subscription library, containing about 1600 volumes of all classes of literature. The houses exhibited considerable diversity, some being thatched and others slated, while old cottages and new villas were not unfrequently found standing close together. Almost without exception, the houses had gardens attached to them, and as a natural consequence, flower-culture was largely engaged in. Owing to the trimness of its gardens, and the beauty of its situation, Lilliesleaf was among the prettiest of the Border villages, and its advantages have been fully appreciated by Scottish artists, who have found in it and its environs charming subjects for their brush.

== The Church ==
The church is first mentioned in 1116 AD in the document "The Inquisition of David". In 1174, Walter, chaplain of Lilliesleaf, was witness in a land dispute.

The current parish church, built in 1771, restored in 1883, and extended in 1910, stands a little way beyond the east end of the village. It is surrounded on three sides by the churchyard, which contains a few curious tombstones, and the remains of an old ivy-grown chapel. The improvements of 1883 changed it from a plain barn-like building to one of taste and elegance. They embraced the addition of a nave and bell-tower, and the remodelling of the interior, in which handsome modern benches took the place of the old 'box-pews.' The lighting of the church has been much improved by the new windows in the nave and the enlargement of the old windows in the transepts. A fine-toned bell, which cost about £100, and weighs 8.5 cwts., has been presented to the church by Mr Edward W. Sprot, younger son of the late Mr Mark Sprot of Riddell. An interesting relic is the old stone font. It was removed from the church at the Reformation, and eventually found its way into the moss, where for a long time it lay buried. It has lately been dug up, and placed at one of the entrance doors of the church. The United Presbyterian church was erected in 1805. Besides the girls' school at the village, built by subscription in 1860 on ground bequeathed by the late Mr Currie of Linthill, there is the public school, once known as the parish school, also at the village, and built in 1822, which, with accommodation for 191 children, had an average attendance of about 135, and a grant of over £134. The inhabitants were chiefly employed in agriculture and trades connected therewith.

== Village demography ==
Pop. (1861) 325, (1871) 349, (1881) 315, (1891) 302.

== Lilliesleaf parish ==
Lilliesleaf parish is bounded northwest by Selkirk, north by Bowden, northeast and east by Ancrum, southeast by Minto and Wilton, and west by Ashkirk. Almost all the land in the parish is arable, and what remains is taken up with pasture. The ground is gently undulating, sinking in the northeast to 390 feet above sea-level, and rising thence to 556 feet near the village, 754 near Greatlaws, 711 near Newhouse, and 936 at Black Craig. The soil is mostly loam and clay, and there is little or no sand. The predominant rocks are Silurian and Devonian. A portion of the Waverley route of the North British railway passes through the parish. 'Ancient Riddell's fair domain' belonged till 1823 to a family of that name, whose ancestor Walter de Riddell obtained a charter of Lilliesleaf, Whittunes, etc., about the middle of the 12th century, and who received a baronetcy in 1628. The remoter antiquity of the family has been rested upon the discovery, in the old chapel of Riddell, of two stone coffins, one of which contained 'an earthen pot, filled with ashes and arms, bearing a legible date, a.d. 727,' while the other was filled with ' the bones of a man of gigantic size.' These coffins, it has been conjectured, contained the remains of ancestors of the family, although this view has been rejected by Sir Walter B. Riddell. Lilliesleaf Moor was the scene of many ' Conventicles ' held by the Covenanters, and upon it took place several skirmishes between them and their opponents. The chief engagement occurred at Bewlie Moss.

This parish is in the presbytery of Selkirk and synod of Merse and Teviotdale. The stipend amounts to £320 with manse. The old church of Lilliesleaf belonged before the year 1116 to the Church of Glasgow, whose right over it was confirmed by several Papal Bulls. A church which also belonged to the See of Glasgow, stood at Hermiston or Herdmanstown, and in addition to it, there were chapels at Riddell (where Riddell Mill now stands) and at Chapel (on the present site of Chapel Farm).

=== Demography ===
Pop. (1881) 718, (1891) 649.— Ord. Sur., shs. 17, 25, 1864–65.

== Modern village ==
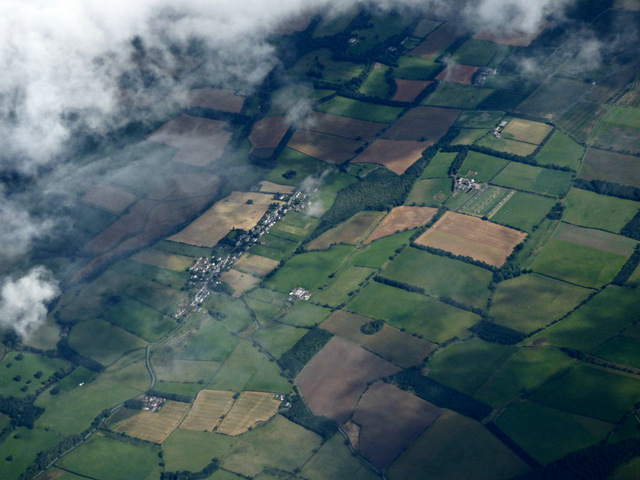
Lilliesleaf from the air

Sheriff confronted by his sister at a Blackadder conventicle on Lilliesleaf Moor. Robert Bennet of Chesters was in the crowd and sent the people home; they did not dismiss at the threats of the soldiers.

To the north of Lilliesleaf is the Ale Water which runs east to west. To the east of the village is the sports field and where the Ale runs beside it, lies "Postie's Pool." The legend of this pool, passed from child to child in the village, states that a local postie used to ford the river here on the way to the Riddell estate. One day he was crossing the river when he became entangled in the weeds in the pool and drowned. The pool was a popular place during the 1990s for people to cool off during hot weather.

The wetland named "The Moss" is to the south of Lilliesleaf as is the Stank - a bridleway used by walkers. This path runs beside what is locally known as the "Elephant House", so named after a travelling circus housed an elephant within its four walls.

The field directly to the east of the Stank was home to the best sledging hill in the village. Every winter kids could be seen on sledges, bin bags and even surfboards, trying to see who could go the fastest and furthest, trying to reach the iced frozen overflow from the Moss at the bottom of the field.

To the north of the village a single track road - the Wynd - runs down to the Ale. The ford and footbridge across the river can be found at this stretch of the Ale. As can the "Deep Corner" slightly further along and round a bend. This corner was a popular place for cooling off and also for fishing for eels. Near to this was the old rope swing which provided much enjoyment for local children.

In covenanting times, conventicles were held on Lilliesleaf moor.

Lilliesleaf currently has two pubs, the Cross Keys and the Plough. There is also a cafe named "The Jammy Coo" which sells food, drinks, paintings and jewelry. Lilliesleaf has a primary school and one church in current use. There is also a village hall - the Currie Memorial Hall - located next to the school and was at one time opposite a field, now replaced by housing.

The village is part of the Selkirk High School catchment area and the local children will generally attend this upon finishing primary school.

There is no regular public transport in Lilliesleaf. Lilliesleaf has no shops, but used to have a hardware shop, post office (with a hairdresser in its back room), a pottery and a grocer (Haldane's), all of which closed down in the 1990s. For a short time in the 90s there was also a fishmonger and an antique shop as well but neither lasted long.

On Sundays certain local residents took on the responsibility of providing Sunday papers for the village and it was common place to see people queuing at no 5 Muselie Drive for their papers and fresh rolls. After this practice ended there was a number of years before the Sunday papers were once again available in the village. This time they were delivered to people's houses by boys going round the village with the papers in the wooden bogie.

The village has one play park at the bottom of Muselie Drive which has seen many changes.

== Notable people ==
- Alexander Jeffrey- solicitor, local historian
- William Knox - poet often recited by Lincoln
- Ian MacDougall - author of "Voices from Lilliesleaf"
- Charles James Buchanan Riddell - major-general, meteorologist
- Margaret Paulin Young was born here in 1864. She was the daughter of the Presbyterian minister and she transformed the Park School in Glasgow.
