= Ashkirk =

Village in Scottish Borders, Scotland

Coordinates: 55.48°N 02.84°W

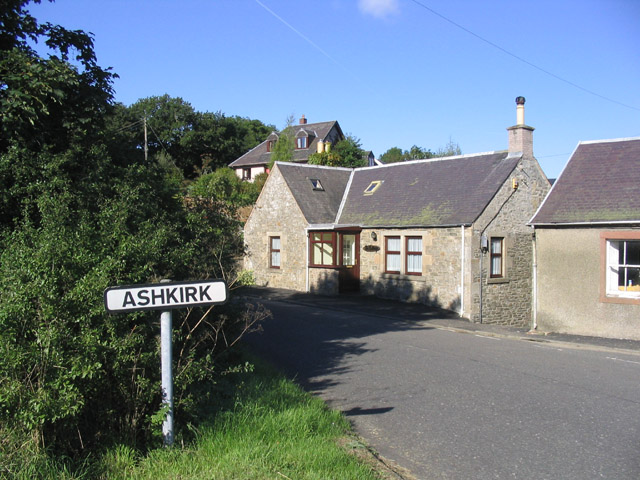
- Houses at Ashkirk

- Location within the Scottish Borders
- Population: 139 (2011 census)
- OS grid reference: NT4722
- Community council: Lilliesleaf, Ashkirk and Midlem
- Council area: Scottish Borders
- Country: Scotland
- Sovereign state: United Kingdom
- Post town: SELKIRK
- Postcode district: TD7
- Police: Scotland
- Fire: Scottish
- Ambulance: Scottish
- UK Parliament: Berwickshire, Roxburgh and Selkirk
- Scottish Parliament: Ettrick, Roxburgh and Berwickshire

Ashkirk is a small village on the Ale Water, in the Scottish Borders area of Scotland. It is located just off the A7 road, approximately 6 miles (10 kilometres) each way between Selkirk to the north and Hawick to the south.

Other places nearby include the Alemoor Loch, Appletreehall, Belses, Essenside Loch, the Ettrick Water, Ettrickbridge, Philiphaugh, Salenside and Woll.

The village is home to the Woll golf course, Ashkirk Village Hall, and the Smiddy Bar & Restaurant

== History ==
Formerly, two thirds of the parish of Ashkirk lay in Roxburghshire and one third in Selkirkshire, including an enclave of Selkirkshire just east of the village around Synton. In 1891 a Boundary Commission moved the whole parish into Selkirkshire and added to Ashkirk a detached portion of the parish of Selkirk just west of the village, which was already in Selkirkshire (Todrig).

== Notable persons ==
- Alasdair Allan, MSP for Na h-Eileanan an Iar (the Western Isles), grew up in Ashkirk.
- Conservative MP James Cran spent the latter part of his life in Ashkirk and died there in 2023.
- Doug Davies, Scottish rugby player, was born in Ashkirk.
- Scottish-Australian poet and bush balladeer Will H. Ogilvie (1869–1963) was born near Kelso, Scottish Borders, and from 1918 to his death he first leased then bought the Presbyterian church manse 'Kirklea' on the northside of Ashkirk. After returning from Australia (1889–1901), Ogilvie became known as the Border poet, including penning Galloping shoes, Over the grass, Handful of leather, and The road to Roberton. His wife Madge is buried with her parents in nearby Ettrickbridge.

== Gallery ==
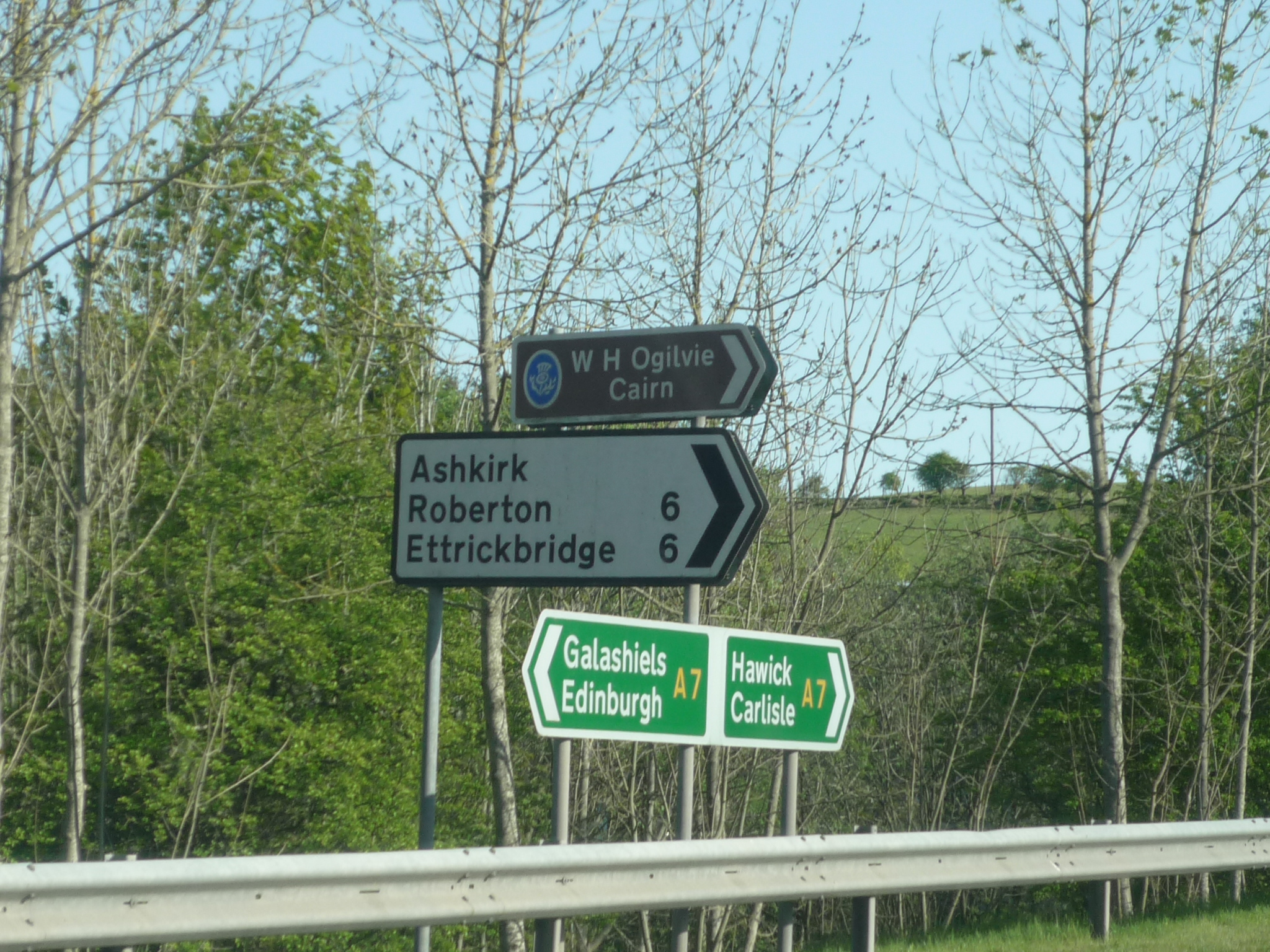
A7 major road turn-off

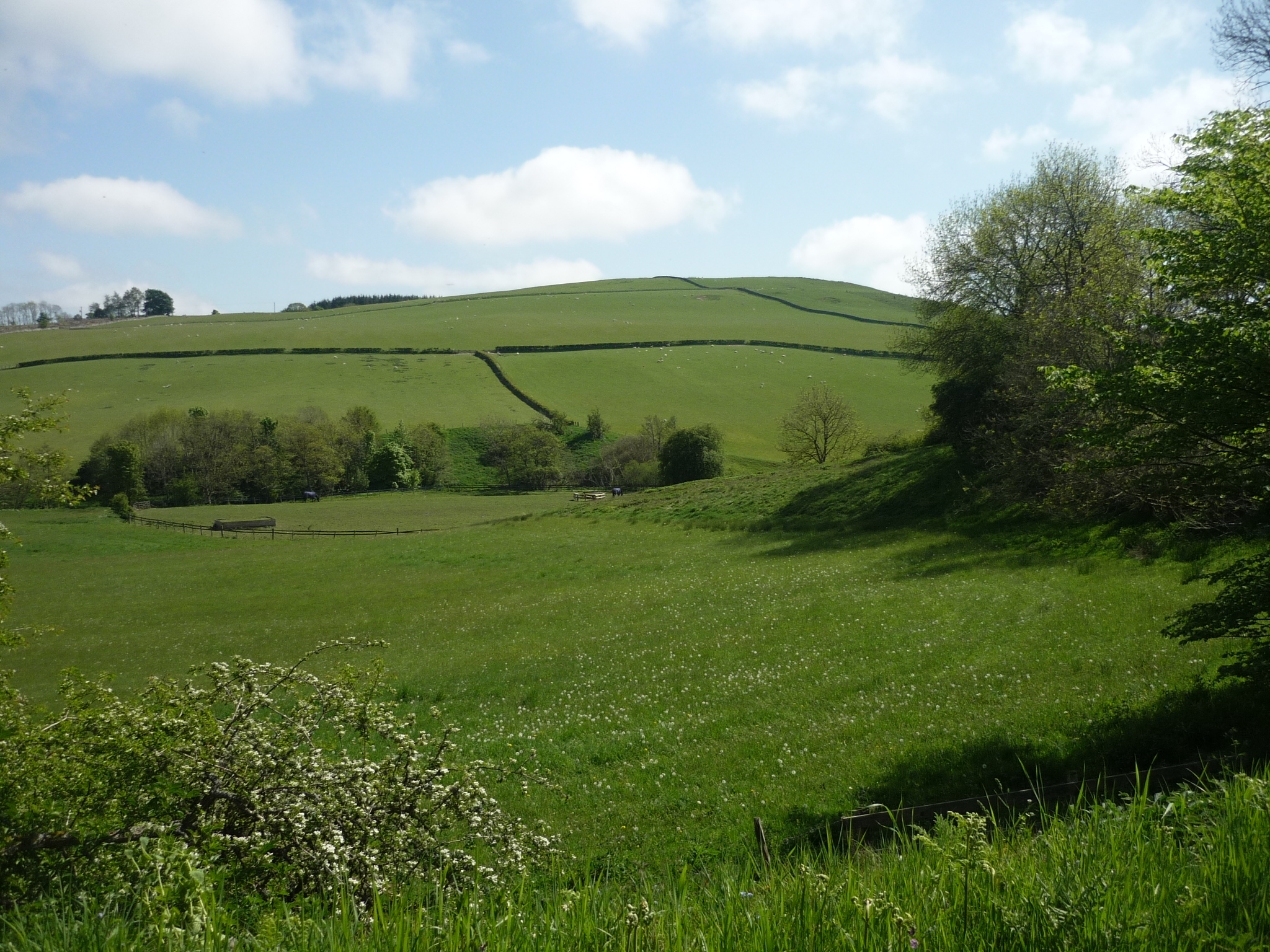
Surrounding farming area

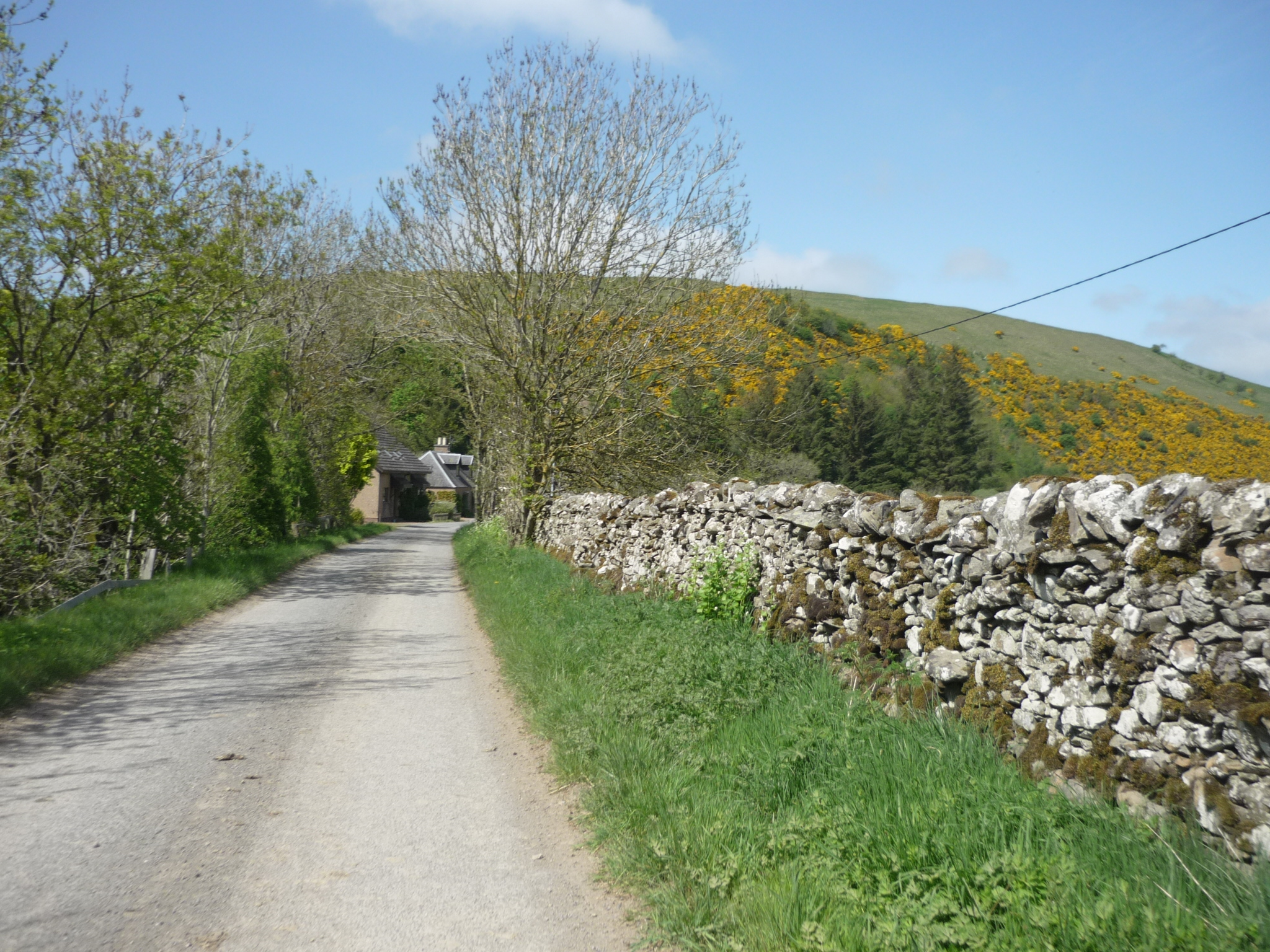
Road west of village with stone wall

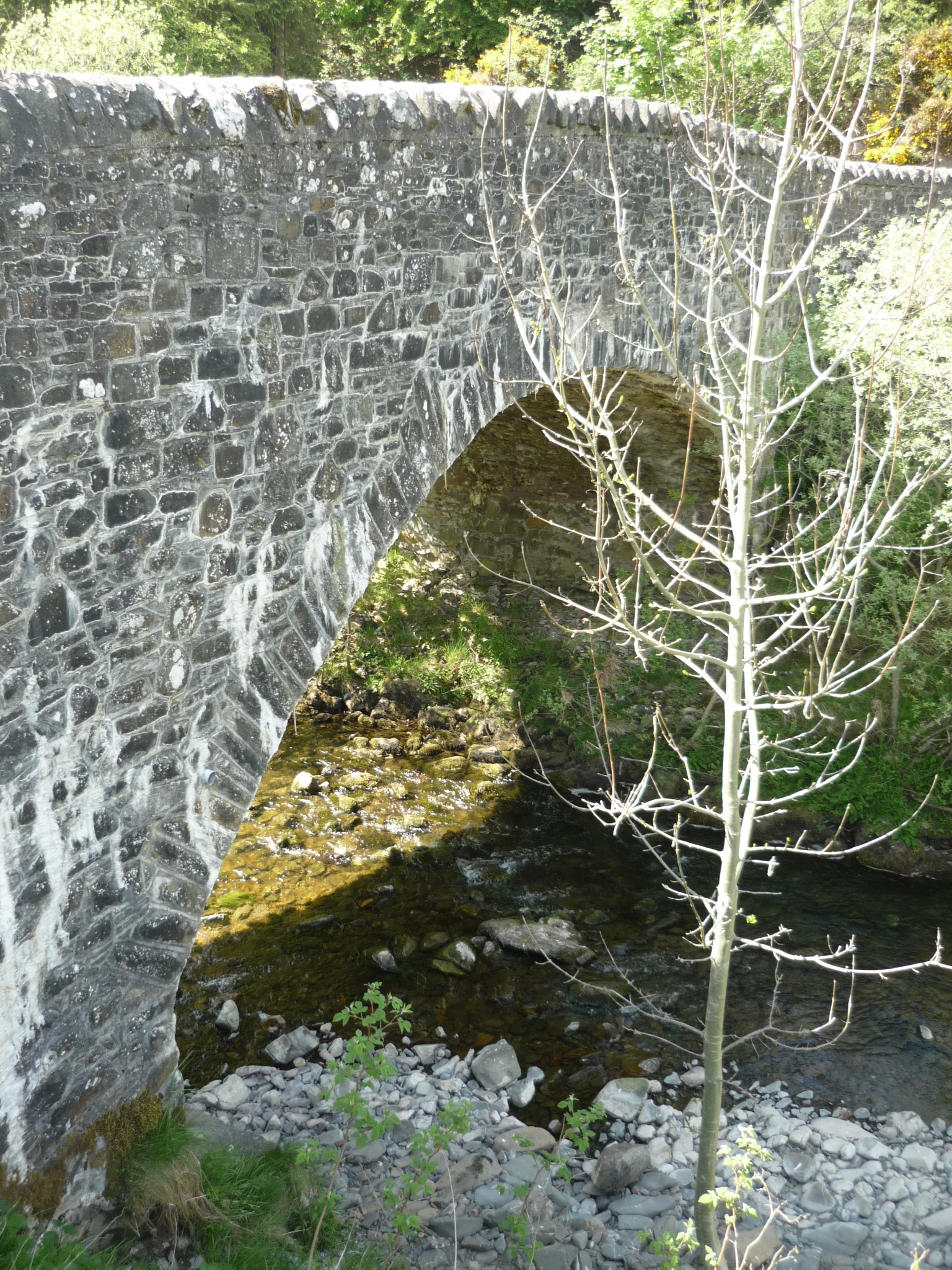
Stone bridge over the Ale Water, west of village

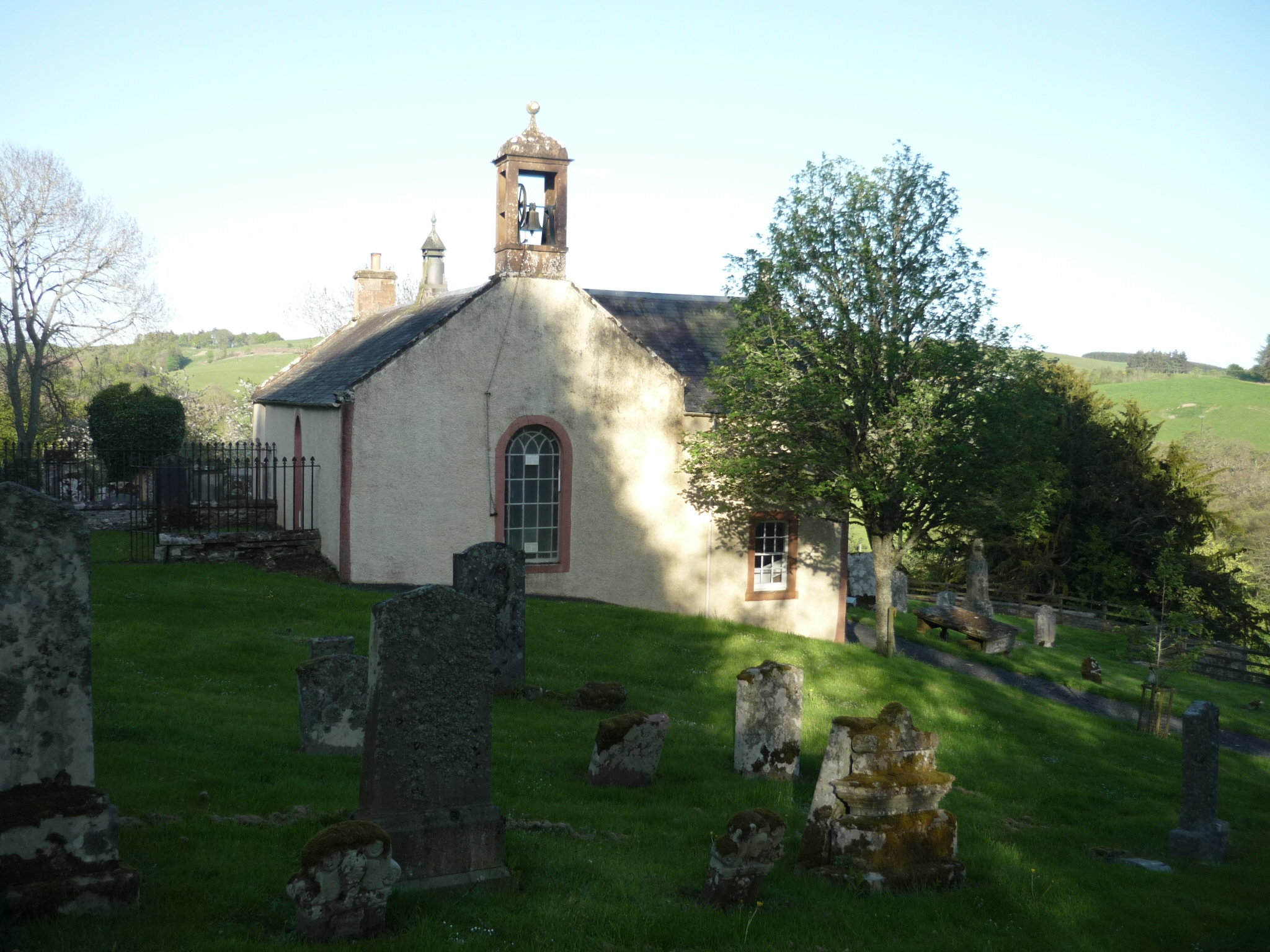
Ashkirk Church yard

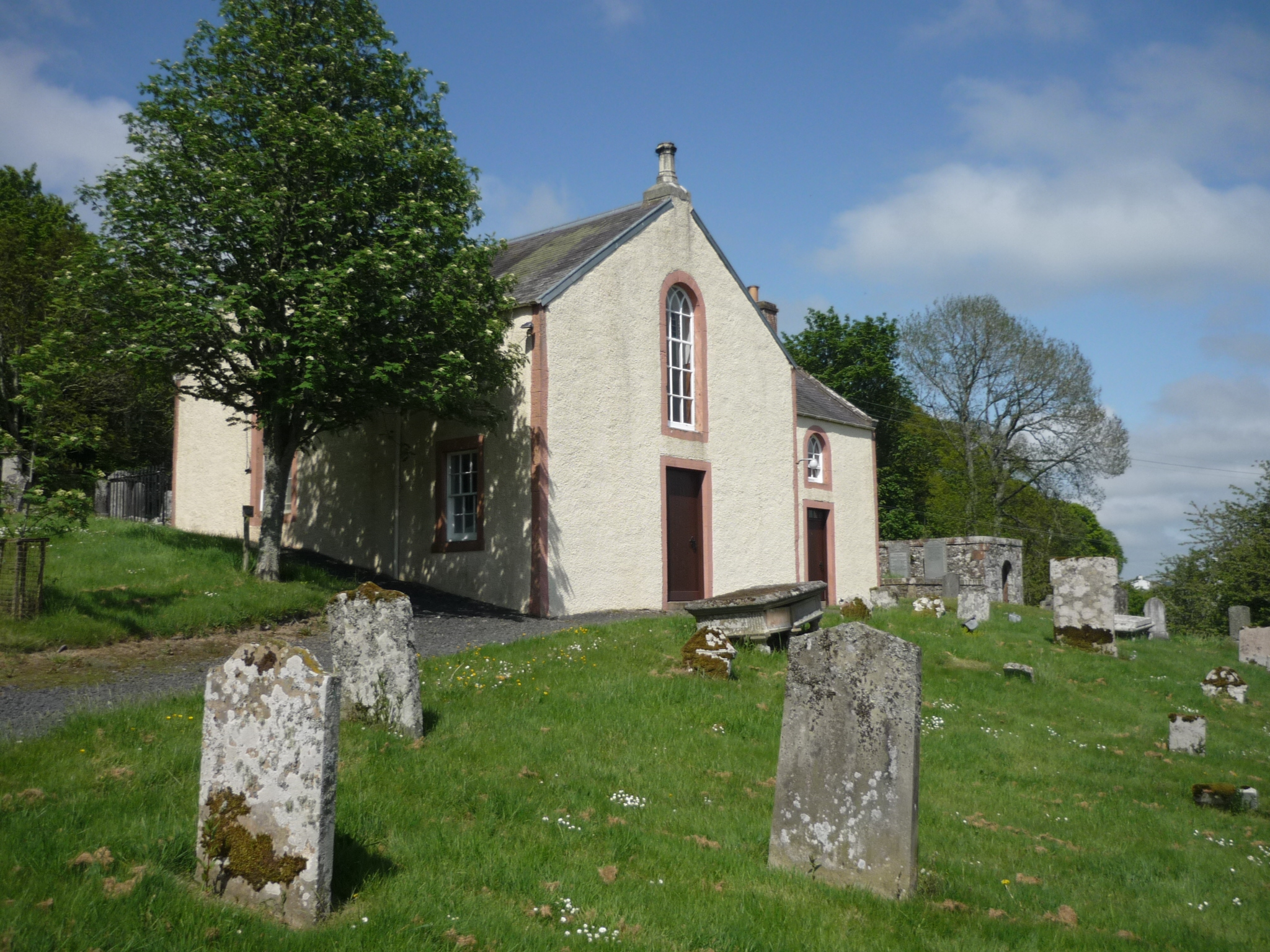
Ashkirk Church front (2018)

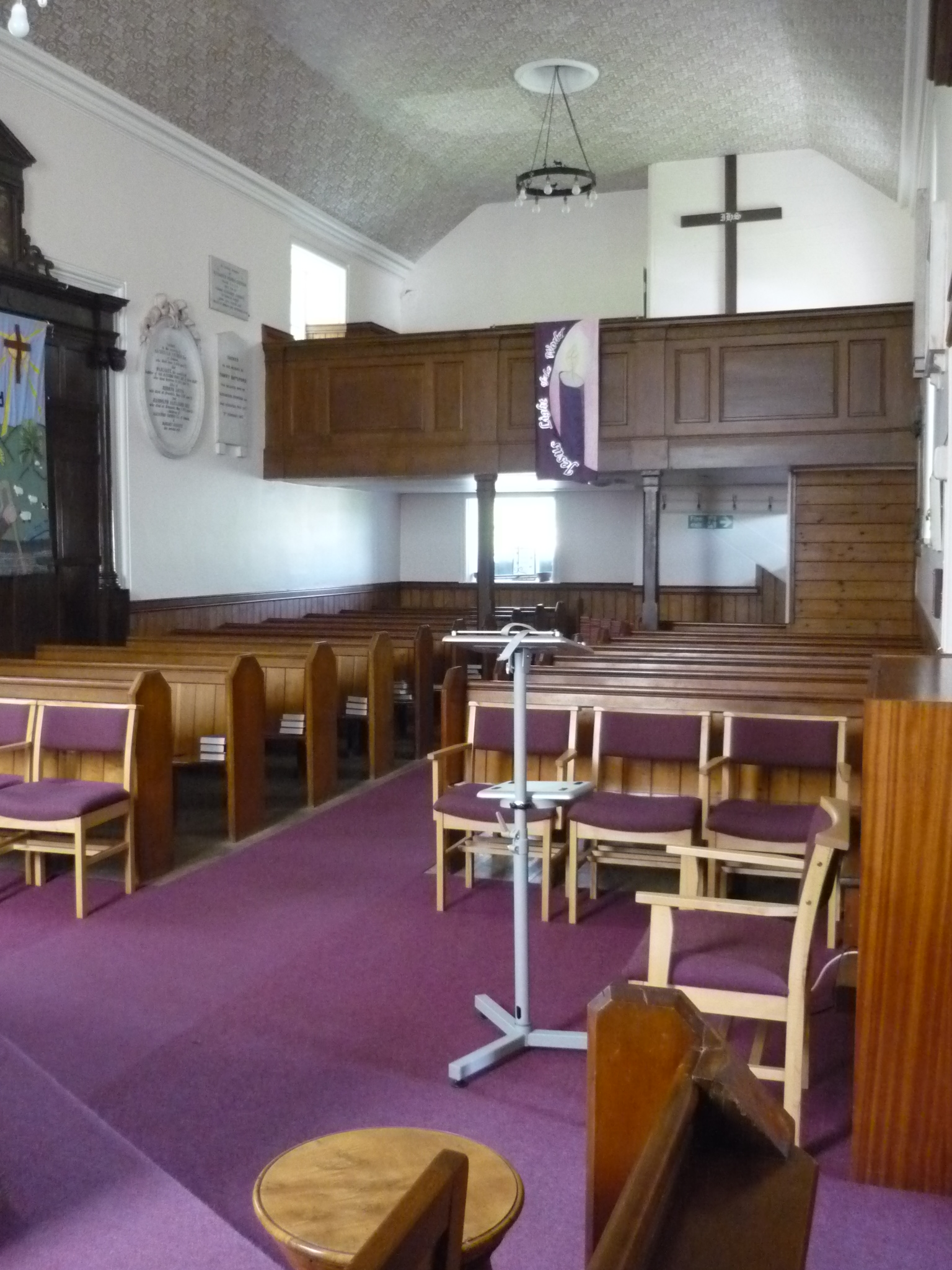
Inside the church

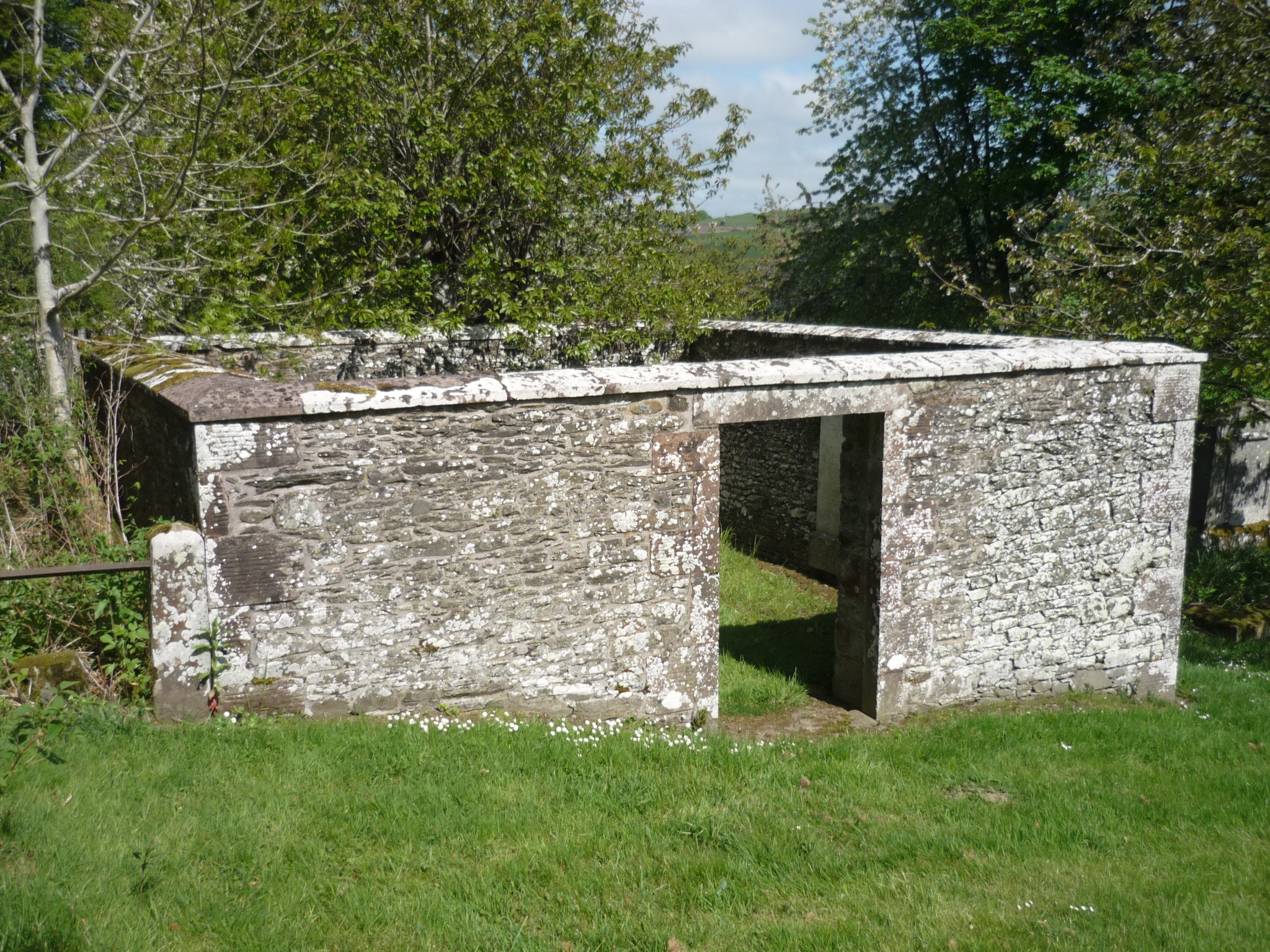
Ogilvie family area at church

== See also ==
- List of places in the Scottish Borders
- List of places in Scotland
