= Salenside =

Village in Scottish Borders, Scotland, UK

Coordinates: 55.479°N 2.848°W

Salenside is a village off the A7, on the Ale Water, near Ashkirk, in the Scottish Borders area of Scotland, in the former Selkirkshire. There was a Salenside Tower house, but nothing remains of it. Salenside Farm and Salenside Cottage exist. The placenames Selkirk and Salenside are related.

Other places nearby include Appletreehall, Essenside, Hawick, Lilliesleaf, Philiphaugh, and Woll.

== See also ==
- List of places in the Scottish Borders
