= Belses =

Village in Scottish Borders, Scotland

Coordinates: 55.5168°N 2.6841°W

Belses is a village on the Ale Water, in the Scottish Borders area of Scotland the former Selkirkshire. It is situated close to Old Belses, and lies south of St Boswells, west of Jedburgh, north of Hawick, and east of Selkirk.

Other places nearby include Ancrum, Ashkirk, Belses, Hassendean, Lilliesleaf, Minto, Old Belses, and Salenside.

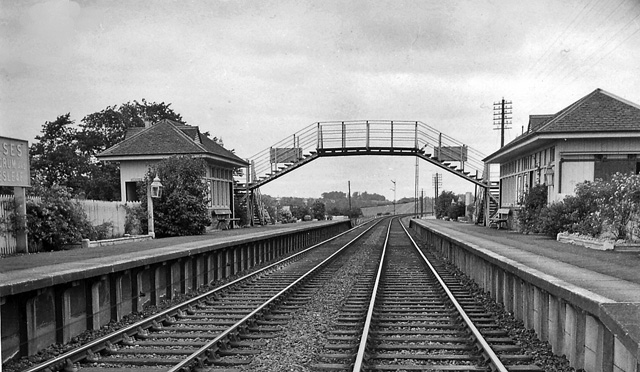
The former station in 1962

Belses was the site of a railway station on the former Waverley Line, a double track railway which linked Edinburgh with Carlisle. The NBR (North British Railway) closed in 1969.

== See also ==
- Belses railway station (redirects to Waverley Line)
- List of places in the Scottish Borders
- List of places in Scotland
- List of closed railway stations in Britain

== Sources ==
- Evans, D (1985) 'Practical Plans, Stow and Belses', Practical Model Railways, vol.June 1985, page(s):32-3
