= Burnfoot =

Burnfoot may refer to:

- Burnfoot, County Londonderry, Northern Ireland
- Burnfoot, County Donegal, Republic of Ireland
- Burnfoot (or Burnfoot of Cluden), Dumfries and Galloway, Scotland
- Burnfoot, East Ayrshire, Scotland
- Burnfoot, North Lanarkshire (neighbourhood of Airdrie), Scotland
- Burnfoot, Hawick, Scottish Borders, Scotland
- Burnfoot, Roberton, Scottish Borders, Scotland
