= Burnfoot, Roberton =

Village near Roberton, in Scottish Borders, Scotland

Coordinates: 55.40733°N 2.92923°W

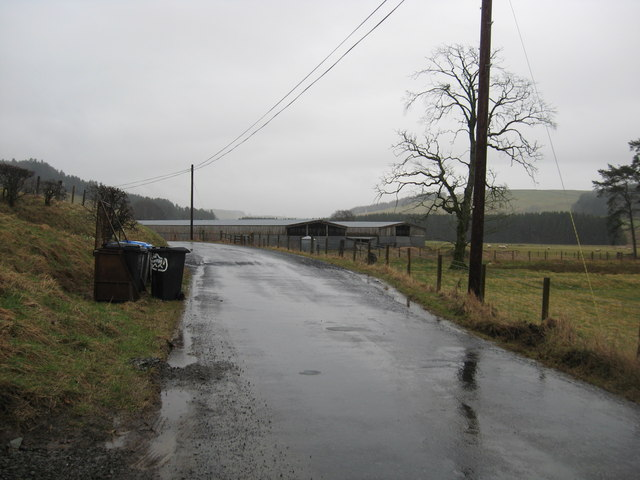
Road through Burnfoot

Burnfoot (Scottish Gaelic: Bun na h-Aibhne) is a hamlet in the Scottish Borders area of Scotland, close to Roberton, by the Borthwick Water. The nearest town is Hawick to the east, and other places nearby include the Alemoor Loch, Branxholme, Broadhaugh, the Craik Forest. The meaning of Burnfoot is "Place at the foot of the burn".

== See also ==
- List of places in the Scottish Borders
- List of places in Scotland
