= Appletreehall =

Village in Scottish Borders, Scotland

Coordinates: 55.44°N 02.76°W

- Location within the Scottish Borders
- OS grid reference: NT5117
- Council area: Scottish Borders
- Country: Scotland
- Sovereign state: United Kingdom
- Post town: HAWICK
- Postcode district: TD9
- Dialling code: 01450
- Police: Scotland
- Fire: Scottish
- Ambulance: Scottish
- UK Parliament: Berwickshire, Roxburgh and Selkirk
- Scottish Parliament: Ettrick, Roxburgh and Berwickshire

Appletreehall is a village in the Scottish Borders area of Scotland, 2 miles (3 kilometres) north-east of Hawick, in the historic county of Roxburghshire.

Nearby are Branxholme, Broadhaugh, Roberton, Wilton and Wilton Dean.

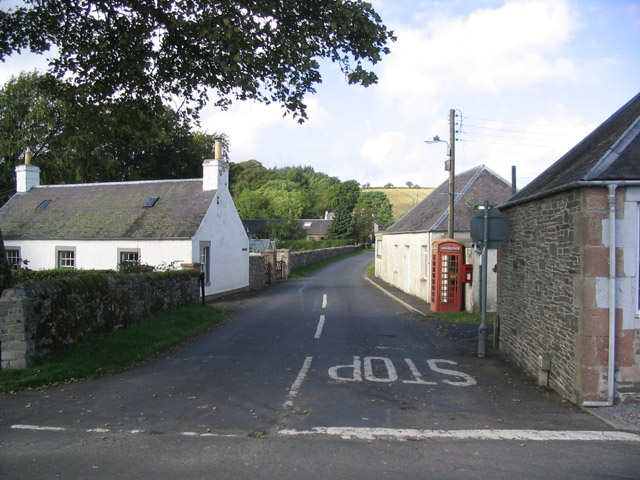
Appletreehall from the B6359

== See also ==
- List of places in the Scottish Borders
- List of places in Scotland
