= Henry Riddell (poet) =

Scottish poet and songwriter

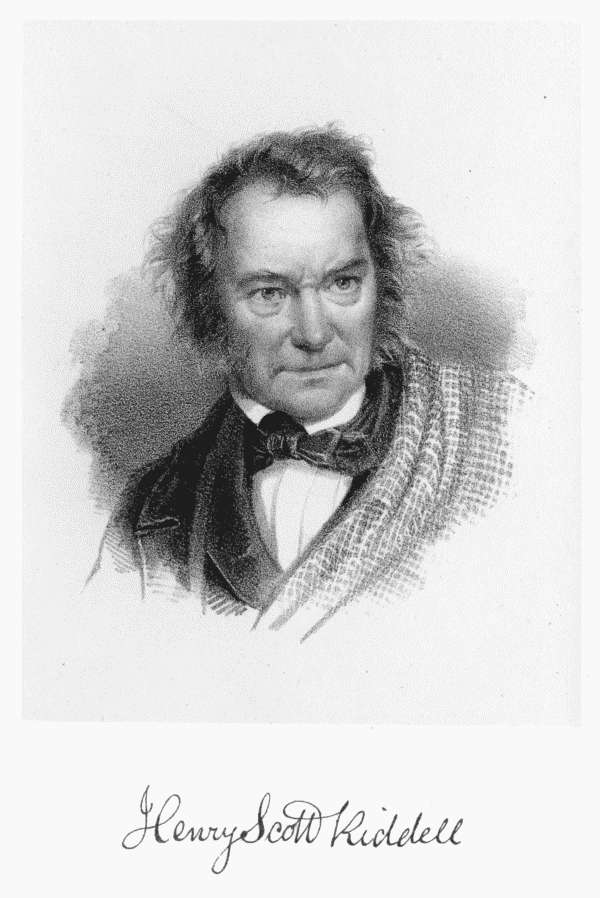
- Born: 23 September 1798; Sorbie, Dumfriesshire, Scotland
- Died: 30 July 1870 (aged 71); Teviothead, Roxburghshire, Scotland
- Occupations: Poet; lyricist; shepherd; lecturer
- Spouse: Eliza Clark
- Children: Walter Scott Riddell; William Brown Clark Riddell; Robert Henry Riddell
- Writing career
- Notable works: "The Crook and Plaid"; "Scotland Yet"; "The Dowie Dens O' Yarrow"; "Christian Politician"

Henry Scott Riddell (23 September 1798 – 30 July 1870) was a Scottish poet and songwriter. In the Scottish Orpheus, a collection of songs of Scotland by Adam Hamilton, he is credited with writing Scotland Yet and The Dowie Dens O' Yarrow.

== Early life ==
Henry Scott Riddell was born on 23 September 1798 in Sorbie, near Langholm, Dumfriesshire, the third child of seven to Robert Riddell, a shepherd, and his wife Agnes (née Scott). His father was reportedly an associate of the Scottish poets James Hogg, the Ettrick Shepherd, who would occasionally visit their household and recite his own poetry to the children, and Walter Scott, as well as Sir Pulteney Malcolm. His younger brother, Borthwick Riddell, known as The Piper, was a locally renowned player of the bagpipes who notably played at the wedding of John Russell, 1st Earl Russell to Lady Frances Anna-Maria Elliot-Murray-Kynynmound, daughter of Gilbert Elliot, 2nd Earl of Minto, on 20 July 1841. His younger brother, Robert Riddell, emigrated to Canada and was an early pioneer of Beverley Township in Ontario. He also participated in the Upper Canada Rebellion, coming to be known as The Chief, leading dozens of men from County Wentworth in a march to Woodstock, Ontario.

== Education ==
The family lived in poverty and the young Riddell was subjected to hard labour during his upbringing. His education progressed slowly, and during his summers he worked as a herd in Deloraine near Buccleuch. He once wrote of his early education saying he progressed as much as any other boy "who love the foot-ball better than the spelling-book." During the winter he and his siblings were educated either at their home by visiting masters or boarded at schools in nearby Roberton or Hawick. In 1817, following the death of his father, Riddell began attending the parish school in nearby Biggar, where he met Eliza Clark, the daughter of a local merchant whom he later married. However, not yet independent he opted to finish his education before pursuing the marriage. While at Biggar school Riddell was a contributor to the ‘Clydesdale Magazine’ and wrote ‘The Crook and Plaid,’ one of his most successful songs inspired by a trip to Pinkie Cleugh, near Musselburgh, East Lothian. In 1819, he began attending the University of Edinburgh, where he was known to be an acquaintance of George Wilson, the Regius Professor of Engineering. He also studied at the University of St Andrews for at least a year under the tutelage of Thomas Chalmers and other eminent professors. Those that knew Riddell described him as an intelligent man but focused on poetry, often rising from bed late into the night to record his ideas.

He finished his education in 1830 and became a licentiate of the Church of Scotland, moving in with his eldest brother, William, at his cottage at Teviothead. In 1833, he became the incumbent of Caerlanrig chapel shortly before his marriage to Eliza Clark. With no dwelling available, the pair lived together in Hawick, nine miles away from his chapel. Due to the distance and oftentimes bad weather, the commute and conditions were often difficult for Riddell and he was once described as preaching while water dripped from his sleeves onto his bible. Walter Montagu Douglas Scott, 5th Duke of Buccleuch eventually gave him the cottage of Teviothead, where he resided for the rest of his life.

== Later life ==
Riddell married Eliza Clark sometime in 1833, and they had three sons. Walter Scott Riddell was born in 1835 and eventually worked for The Hongkong and Shanghai Banking Corporation, moving to Hong Kong, China. He married and fathered six children after settling in London, England. He died in 1876. Their second son, William Brown Clark Riddell, was described as a prodigy during childhood. He was said to possess a photographic memory and was writing in skilled prose by the age of seven. He attended university for three years before he fell ill, dying at the age of 21 at his father's cottage at Teviothead. In 1840, their third son, Robert Henry Riddell, was born. As an adult he emigrated to Australia.

In 1841, he began acting melancholy and showing signs of insanity. He was confined for a time in an asylum at Dumfries. Following his release, he was allowed by the Duke of Buccleuch to retire while retaining his cottage. He lived a quiet existence, occasionally lecturing in Hawick or the surrounding area, but largely focusing on improving his house and property, or his literary work. He supported the Hawick Archaeological Society on local digs, and wrote a careful article on the community of Cavers. In 1859, at the age of 61, he was presented in Hawick with an Irish harp.

He died at Teviothead 30 July 1870, and was buried in Caerlanrig churchyard. A monument to his memory was erected near to his birthplace in Sorbie, and in 1894 there was affixed to it a tablet inscribed with an appropriate quatrain.

== Works ==
While attending school in Biggar, Riddell was a contributor to the Clydesdale Magazine, and wrote ‘The Crook and Plaid,’ one of his most successful songs. A visit to Pinkie, Midlothian, in his student days inspired the vigorous lyric ‘Ours is the Land of Gallant Hearts.’ He contributed pieces about the same time to the collections of Robert Archibald Smith and Peter McLeod, the latter publishing his picturesque song, ‘Scotland Yet.’ Wilson included, with hearty commendation, in the ‘Noctes Ambrosianæ’ for March 1825, Riddell's lyric, ‘When the Glen all is still.’ Riddell published in 1831 ‘Songs of the Ark,’ sacred pieces which are not of much account. In 1844 appeared the ‘Christian Politician,’ a doctrinal volume displaying argumentative power and force of character. A volume entitled ‘Poems, Songs, and Miscellaneous Pieces,’ was issued in 1847. To ‘Hogg's Instructor,’ in 1847, Riddell contributed a discriminating account of the Ettrick shepherd. He translated into lowland Scotch, in 1855 and 1857 respectively, St. Matthew and the Psalms of David, the latter for Prince Lucien Bonaparte. For the ‘Scottish Agricultural Journal,’ in 1848–9, he wrote substantial papers on ‘Store-farming in the South of Scotland,’ and about the same time received from the Highland and Agricultural Society a prize of 10l. for an ‘Essay on Foot-rot in Sheep.’ In 1871, the year after his death, appeared, in two volumes, ‘The Poetical Works of Henry Scott Riddell,’ edited, with a memoir, by Dr. Brydon. Riddell's longer pieces, while ingenious, tend to heaviness, but one or two of his lyrics reach a high standard, and ‘Scotland Yet,’ set to very appropriate music, is one of the most popular of Scottish songs.
