= Roberton, Scottish Borders =

Coordinates: 55.4194°N 2.9006°W

Roberton: Scots: Raberton
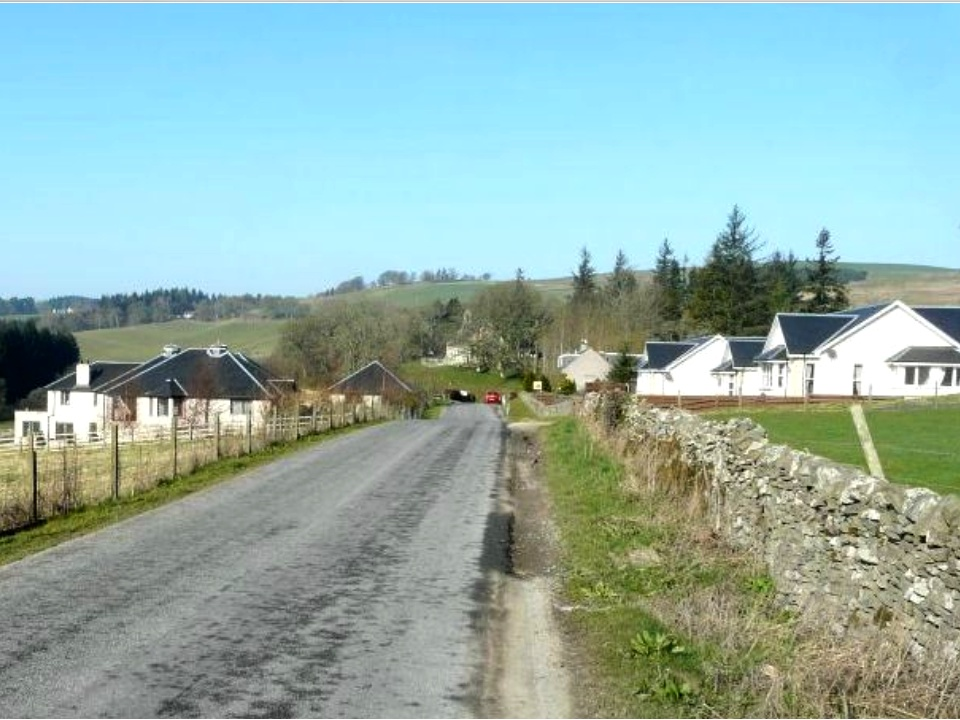
- Roberton

- Location within the Scottish Borders
- Language: English; Southern Scots
- OS grid reference: NT430143
- Council area: Scottish Borders
- Lieutenancy area: Roxburgh, Ettrick and Lauderdale
- Country: Scotland
- Sovereign state: United Kingdom
- Post town: HAWICK
- Postcode district: TD9
- Dialling code: 01450
- Police: Scotland
- Fire: Scottish
- Ambulance: Scottish
- UK Parliament: Berwickshire, Roxburgh and Selkirk
- Scottish Parliament: Ettrick, Roxburgh and Berwickshire

Roberton is a small village in the Scottish Borders area of Scotland, on the B711 and near to the A7, 5 miles (8 kilometres) from Hawick, 22 mi (35 km) from Galashiels, and 23 mi (37 km) from Langholm. It is situated by the Ale Water, the Alemoor Loch and the Borthwick Water, and nearby are Branxholme, Broadhaugh, Burnfoot and the Craik Forest.

== Borders poet ==
The Borders poet Will H. Ogilvie (1869–1963) was born in Kelso and died in nearby Ashkirk. A cairn has been erected in his memory.

The hill road to Roberton's a steep road to climb, But where your foot has crushed it, you can smell the scented thyme, And if your heart's a Border heart, look down to Harden Glen, And hear the blue hills ringing with the restless hoofs again...

Unveiled in August 1993, an identical cairn was also erected in Bourke, New South Wales. The bronze was prised from the surface and stolen in August 2016 for metal theft. One of Ogilvie's 800+ poems included the six stanza The road to Roberton:

The hill road to Roberton: Ale Water at our feet,
And grey hills and blue hills that melt away and meet,
With cotton-flowers that wave to us and lone whaups that call,
And over all the Border mist – the soft mist over all.

When Scotland married England long, long ago,
The winds spun a wedding-veil of moonlight and snow,
A veil of filmy silver that sun and rain had kissed,
And she left it to the Border in a soft grey mist.

A replacement cairn was installed at Harden Glen on the anniversary of Ogilvie's 150th birthday, in August 2019.

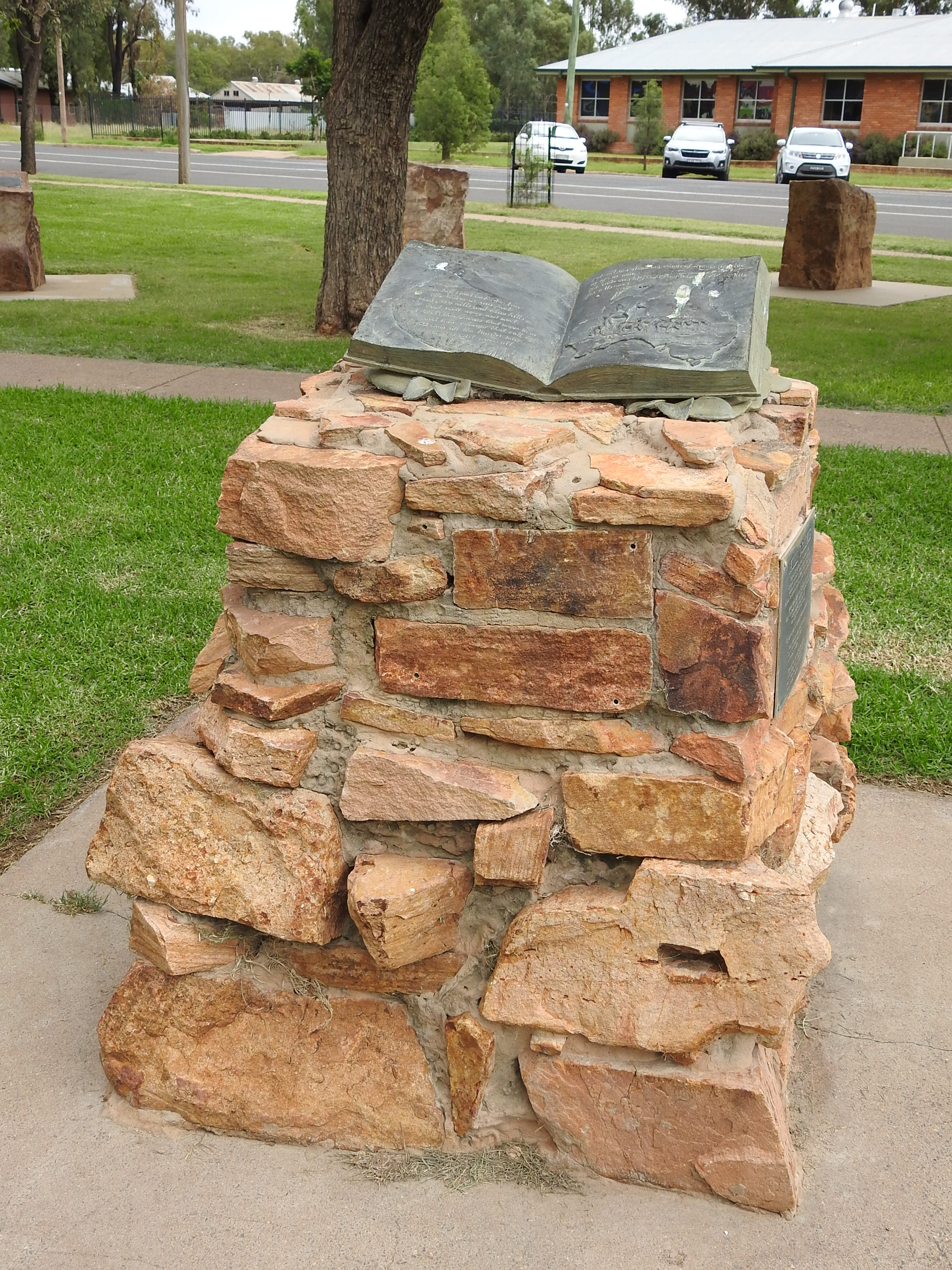
Stone cairn and bronze sculpture relating to Australian–Scottish poet Ogilvie, Bourke, NSW, Australia (2021).

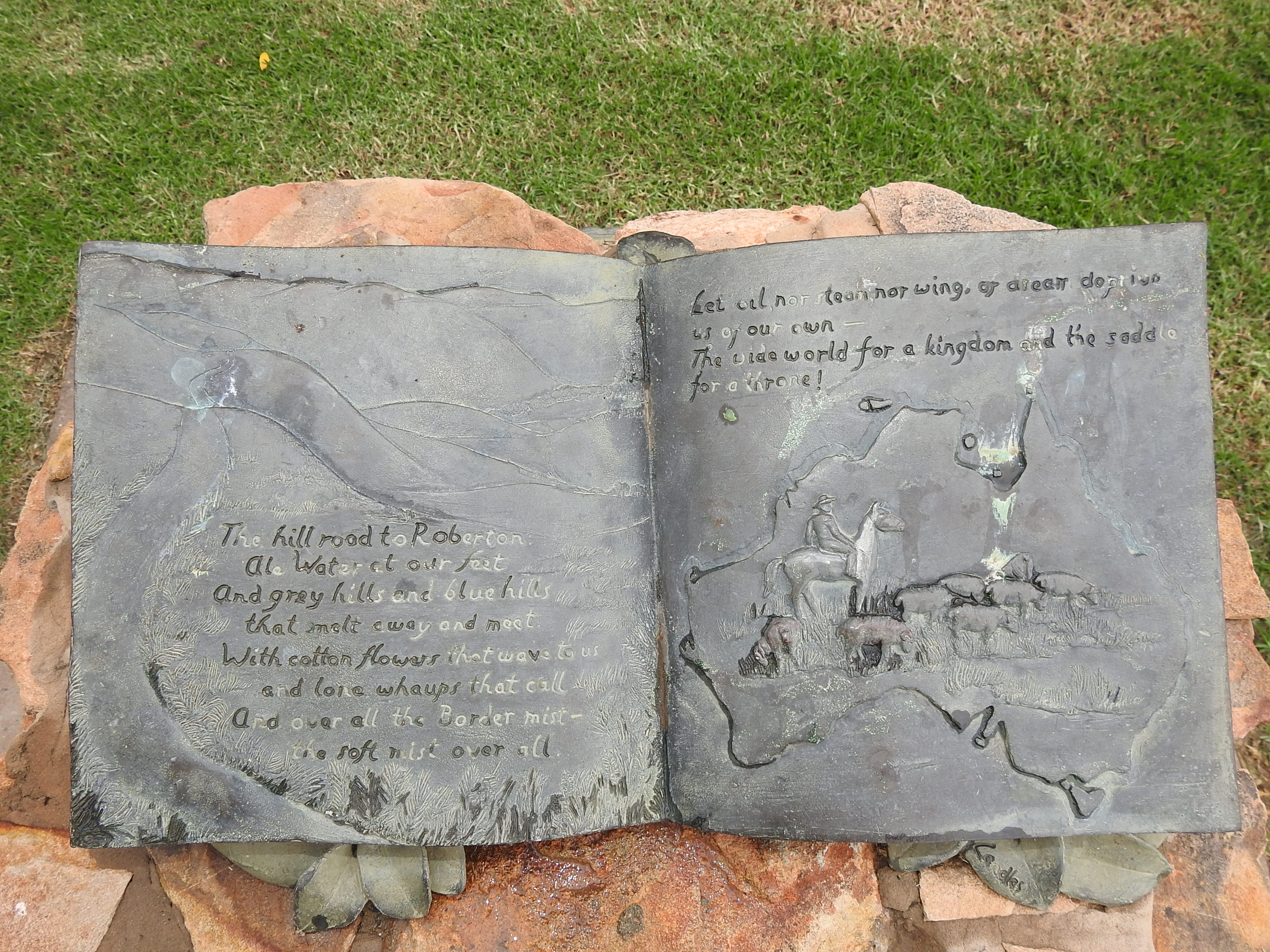
Ogilvie's stone cairn and bronze sculpture at Bourke (2021).

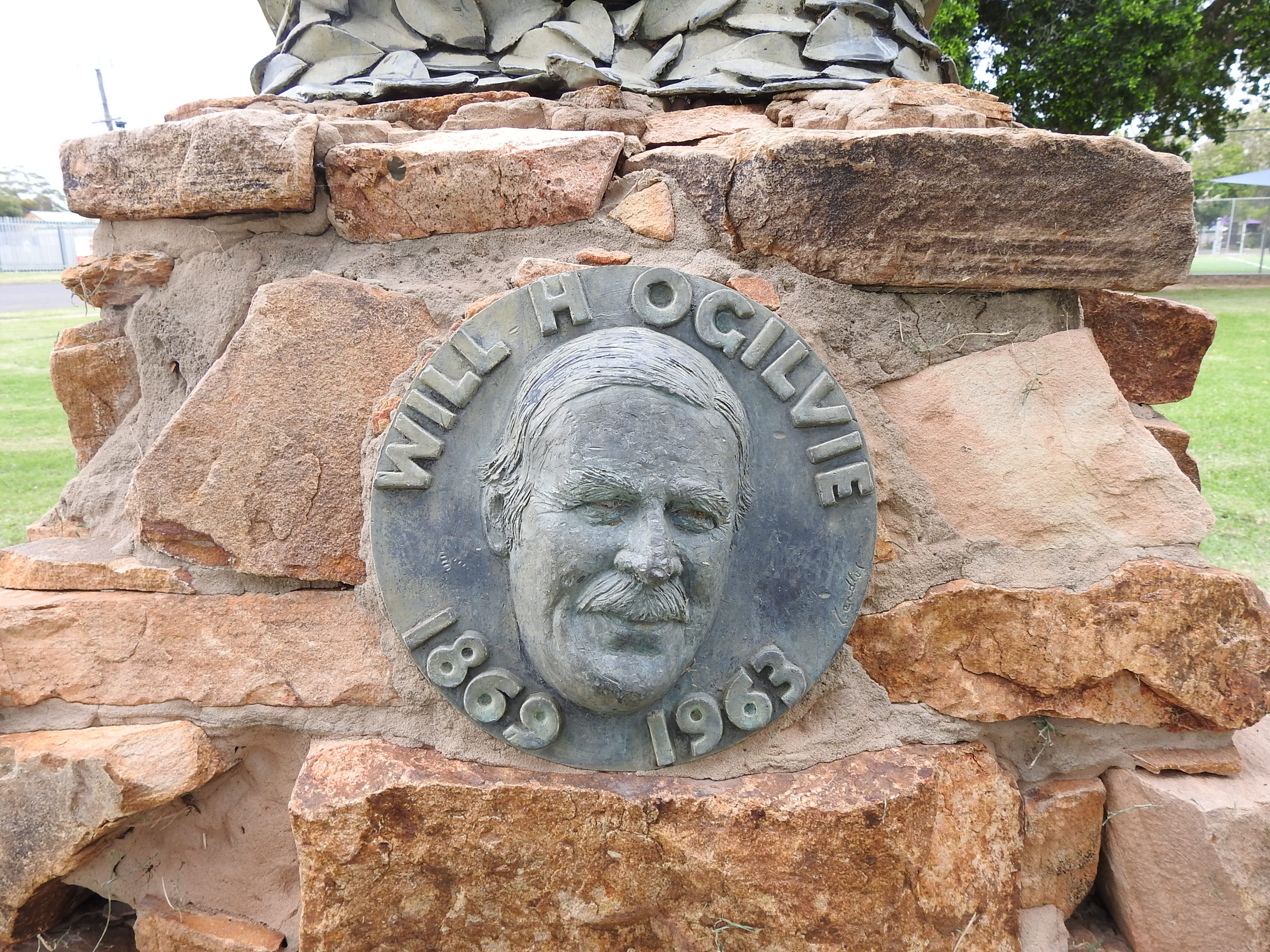
Ogilvie's bronze, at Bourke (2021).

== Borthwick Mains Symbol Stone ==
One-half mile (800 metres) to the east of the village, in front of the house at Borthwick Mains, is a fish symbol-stone, possibly representing a salmon. The stone is 1.5 metres (4 ft 11 in) high, and the figure of a fish is almost a metre long, with the tail downwards, cut into the stone with pecked lines. It is similar to class 1 Pictish symbol stones of the 6th or 7th century, but its status is doubtful, and it may belong to a more recent period.

== See also ==
- List of places in the Scottish Borders
- List of places in Scotland
- List of Scottish writers
