= River Esk (Solway Firth) =

River in Dumfries and Galloway, Scotland

Coordinates: 54.98175°N 3.00287°W

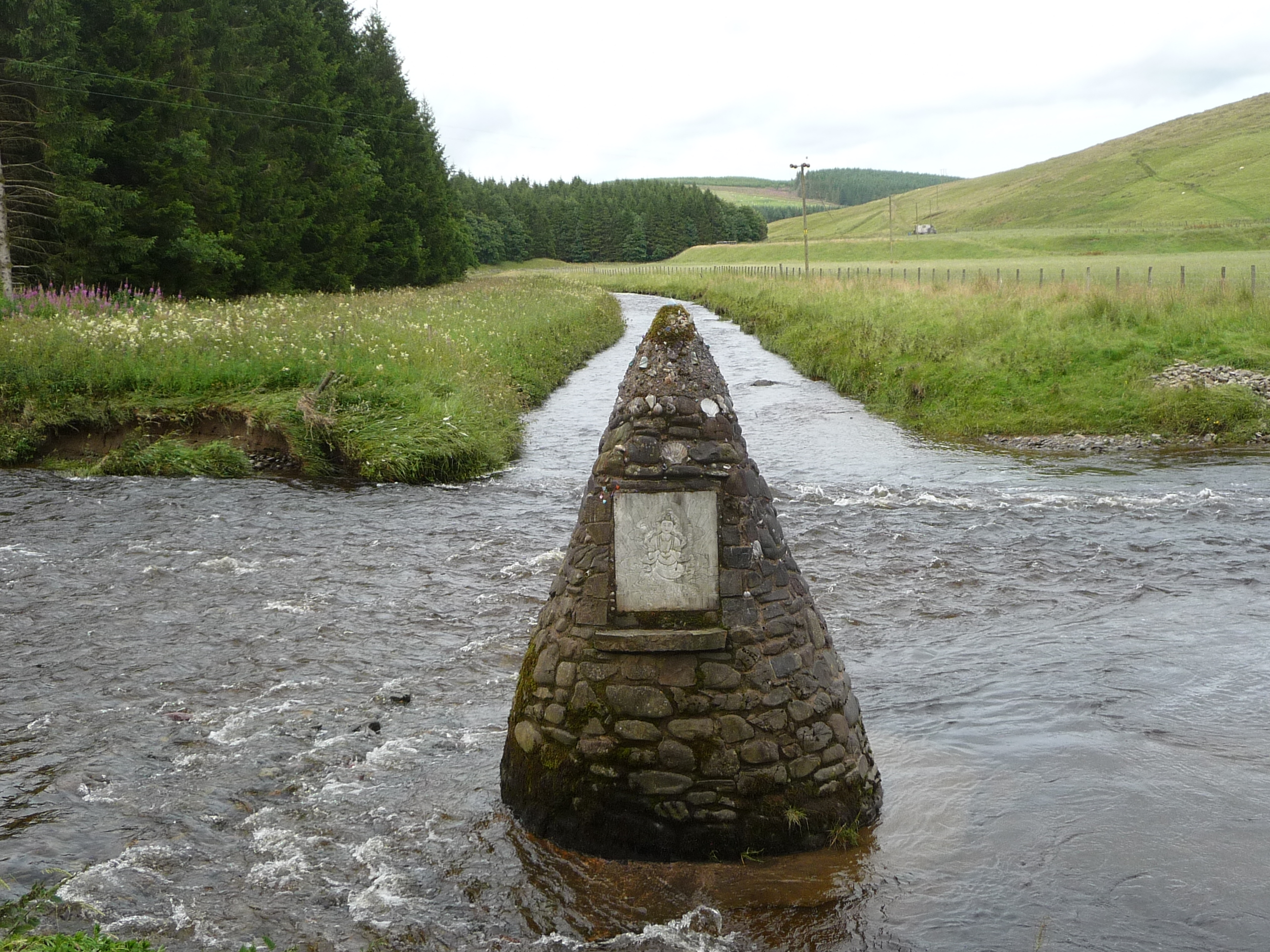
River Esk near Kagyu Samyé Ling Monastery and Tibetan Centre at Eskdalemuir

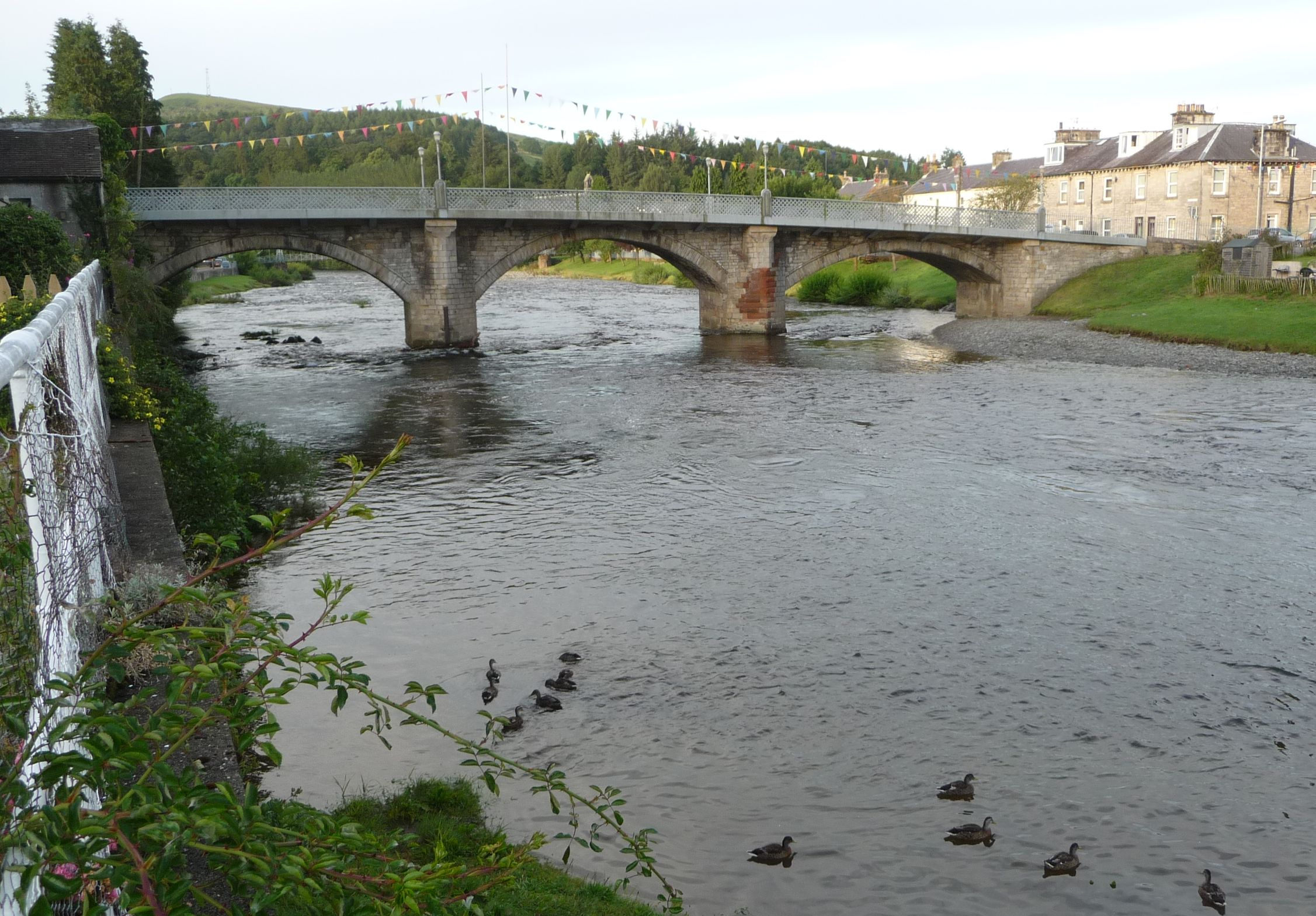
River Esk in Langholm

The River Esk (Scottish Gaelic: Easg), also known as the Border Esk, is a river that rises in the Scottish region of Dumfries and Galloway before crossing the border to the English county of Cumbria and flowing into the Solway Firth.

== Course ==
The river rises in the hills to the east of Moffat and its two main tributaries, the Black Esk and the White Esk, merge at the southern end of Castle O'er Forest. It flows south east through Eskdale past Langholm. Near Langholm the river is crossed by the Duchess Bridge which is said to be the oldest iron bridge in Scotland. The Esk merges with Liddel Water (which defines the border between Scotland and England). Before passing Longtown the river enters England and merges with the River Lyne and enters the Solway Firth near the mouth of the River Eden.

It was formerly one of the boundaries of the Debatable Lands as marked by the Scots' Dike.

== Tributaries ==
The various tributaries of the Esk are described proceeding downstream.

The White Esk arises as the Glendearg and Tomleuchar burns merge then flow south through Eskdalemuir Forest capturing the waters of the Garwald Water at Garwaldwaterfoot then continuing by the village of Eskdalemuir into Castle O'er Forest. It is followed by the B709 road for much of its course. The headwaters of the Black Esk feed into the Black Esk Reservoir, from the foot of whose dam, the Black Esk flows south to Sandyford where it is crossed by the B723 road. It then turns sharply east then southeast passing Castle O'er on its way to meet with the White Esk to form the River Esk.

The Meggat Water (not to be confused with Megget Water) is a left bank tributary of the Esk which rises at the southern margin of Craik Forest and flows south, being joined by the Stennies Water before its confluence with the Esk. The Ewes Water is a significant left bank tributary of the Esk which enters the latter at Langholm. Its headwaters, the Eweslees, Mosspaul and Carewoodrig Burns merge and flow southwards as the Ewes Water for several miles, being joined by numerous further burns, the most significant of which is the Meikledale Burn. The valley of the Ewes Water is followed by the A7 road from Carlisle to Edinburgh and by an electricity transmission line. Wauchope Water is a right bank tributary of the Esk which joins immediately downstream from the Ewes Water confluence. It arises as the Logan Water and Bigholms Burn meet 3 miles (5 km) southwest of Langholm. The Tarras Water is a left bank tributary of the Esk which joins it 2.5 miles (4 km) south of Langholm.

The Liddel Water is a major tributary which enters on the left bank between Canonbie and Longtown. It forms the boundary between Scotland and England for a while as does its tributary, the Kershope Burn. The River Lyne enters on the left bank at Lynefoot just above the normal tidal limit of the estuarial section of the Esk. The River Sark and the Kirtle Water enter the tidal estuary of the Esk to the east and west of Gretna respectively. See main articles on each of these and some of their tributaries.

== See also ==
- Glencartholm
