= Burnfoot, Hawick =

Village in Scottish Borders, Scotland

Coordinates: 55.436°N 2.769°W

Burnfoot: Scottish Gaelic: Bun na h-Aibhne; Scots: Burnfit
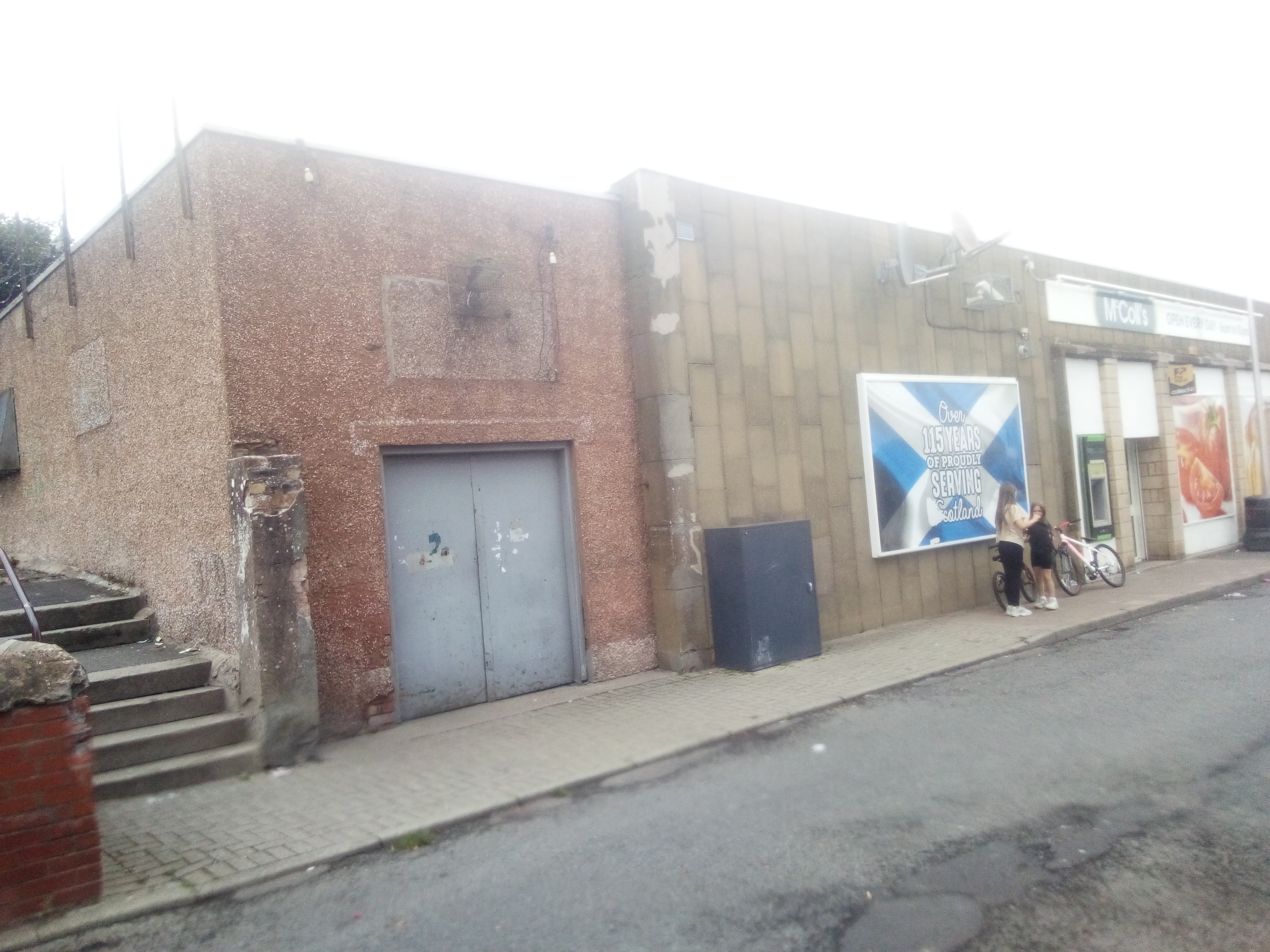

- Location within the Scottish Borders
- OS grid reference: NT514160
  - Edinburgh: 53 mi (85 km)
  - London: 349 mi (562 km)
- Council area: Scottish Borders
- Lieutenancy area: Roxburgh, Ettrick and Lauderdale
- Country: Scotland
- Sovereign state: United Kingdom
- Post town: HAWICK
- Postcode district: TD9
- Dialling code: 01450
- Police: Scotland
- Fire: Scottish
- Ambulance: Scottish
- UK Parliament: Berwickshire, Roxburgh and Selkirk
- Scottish Parliament: Ettrick, Roxburgh and Berwickshire

Burnfoot (Scottish Gaelic: Bun na h-Aibhne, Scots: Burnfit) is a housing estate just east of the A7, in the northern part of Hawick, by the Boonraw Burn, in the Scottish Borders area of Scotland. Wilton Dean and Stirches were also villages surrounding Hawick. Burnfoot was built as a council estate between the 1950s and 1970s and is now mostly owned by the Scottish Borders Housing Association and Waverley Housing, two social landlords in the Borders. It is the poorest part of Hawick, with relatively high rates of social deprivation in several areas, especially around Wilson drive and the Meadows, according to the 2001 census. Like many such areas in Scotland, it also has more than its fair share of antisocial behaviour, with many incidents around the Kenilworth Avenue shops. However, its primary school has won praise for its teaching and attitude to various issues in the past.

Other places nearby include Appletreehall, Burnhead, Burnhead Tower, Kirkton, and Galalaw.

== See also ==
- List of places in the Scottish Borders
- List of places in Scotland
