= Charlesfield Halt railway station =

Disused railway station in Charlesfield, Melrose

Charlesfield Halt
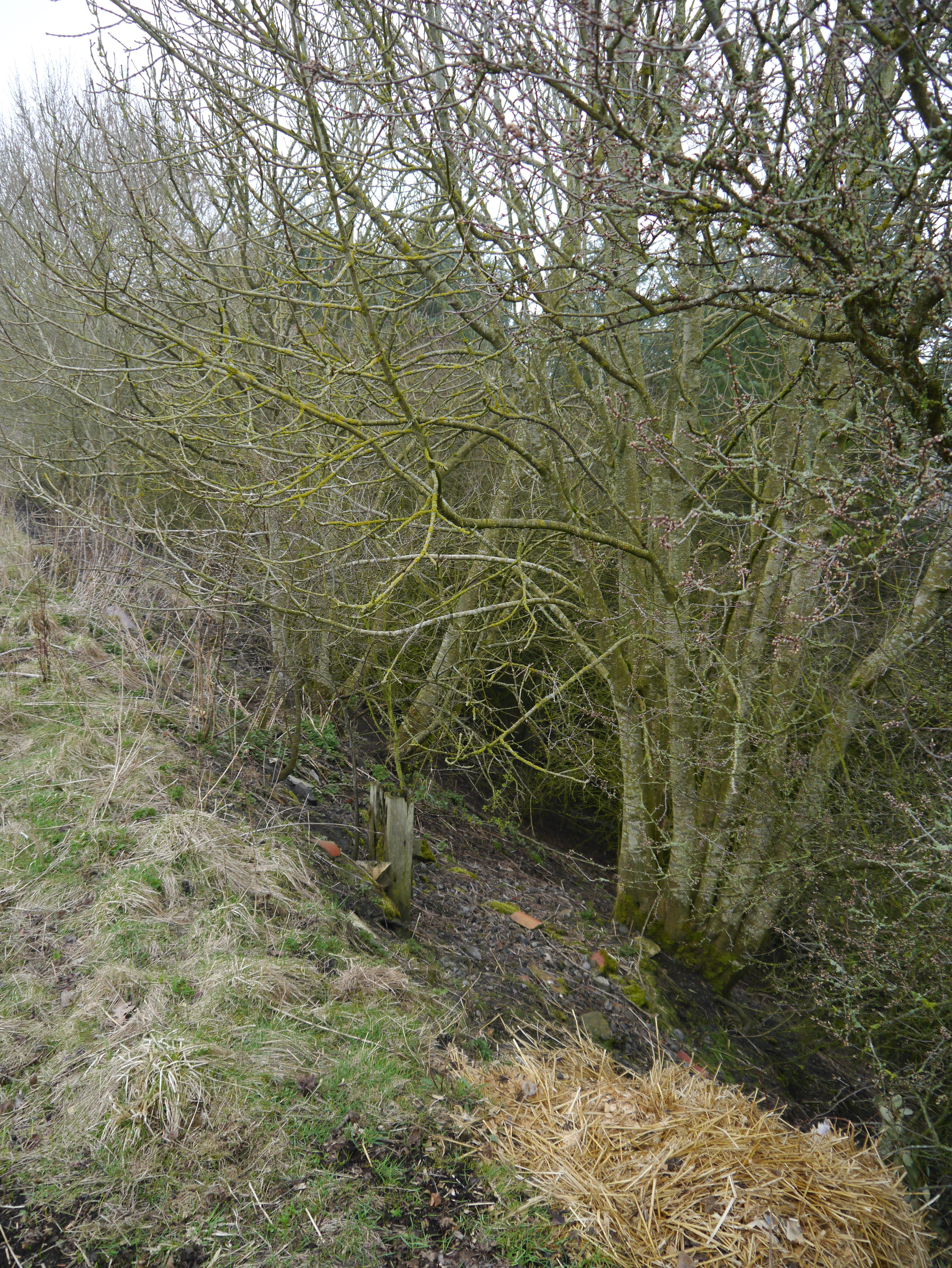
- The site of the station in 2014

General information
- Location: Charlesfield, Melrose; Scotland
- Coordinates: 55.554963°N 2.671697°W
- Grid reference: NT577292
- Platforms: 2

Other information
- Status: Disused

History
- Original company: LNER
- Post-grouping: LNER; British Railways (Scottish Region)

Key dates
- 10 August 1942: Opened
- June 1961: Closed
Location

Charlesfield Halt railway station served the village of Charlesfield, Melrose, Scotland, from 1942 to 1961 on the Waverley Route.

== History ==
The station opened on 10 August 1942 by the LNER. The station is situated to the south of an unnamed minor road. The station was originally intended to be opened for World War 2 workers for the nearby munitions factory where bombs were handled. Production of the bombs ceased after the Second World War and it was used as an armaments store by the Royal Navy Armaments Depot. Use by the Royal Navy ceased in the 1960s and it was then used by West Cumberland Farmers as well as other lesser known farmers for storage and animal husbandry. The station closed in June 1961 to passengers and completely.

Preceding station	Historical railways	Following station
St Boswells; Line closed, station closed	North British Railway; Waverley Route	Belses; Line closed, station closed
