= Craik, Scottish Borders =

Village in Scottish Borders, Scotland

Coordinates: 55.3647°N 3.0302°W

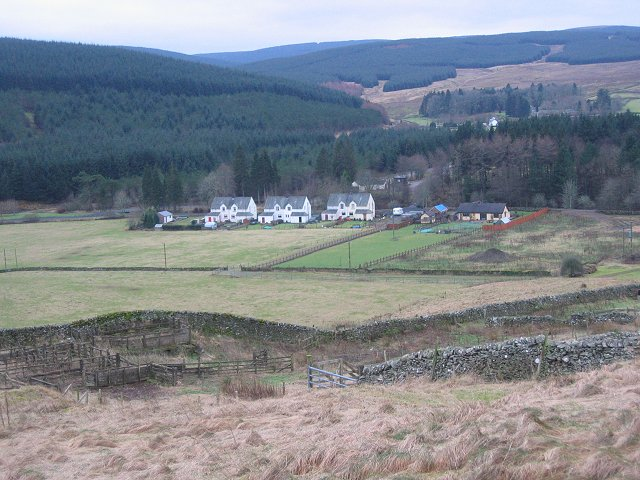
View towards Craik

Craik is a hamlet in Craik Forest, by the Airhouse Burn in the Scottish Borders area of Scotland, close to Roberton, Scottish Borders (grid reference NT348084).

The area is renowned for its red squirrel population, and for its Roman history.

== Etymology ==
Craik seems in origin straightforwardly to be the Cumbric word *creic 'rock'.

== See also ==
- List of places in the Scottish Borders
- List of places in Scotland
