= Old Belses =

Coordinates: 55.515936°N 2.684697°W

- Location within the Scottish Borders
- OS grid reference: NT5624
- Council area: Scottish Borders
- Country: Scotland
- Sovereign state: United Kingdom
- Police: Scotland
- Fire: Scottish
- Ambulance: Scottish
- UK Parliament: Berwickshire, Roxburgh and Selkirk
- Scottish Parliament: Ettrick, Roxburgh and Berwickshire

Old Belses is a village by the Ale Water, in the Parish of Ancrum, in the Scottish Borders of Scotland, in the historic county of Roxburghshire.

Other placenames relating to Belses include Belses Mill, Belses Muir and New Belses.

Belses was a station on the Waverley Line.

== See also ==
- Belses
- List of places in the Scottish Borders
- List of places in Scotland
