= Eskdalemuir Forest =

Forest in southern Scotland

Coordinates: 55°18′N 3°14′W

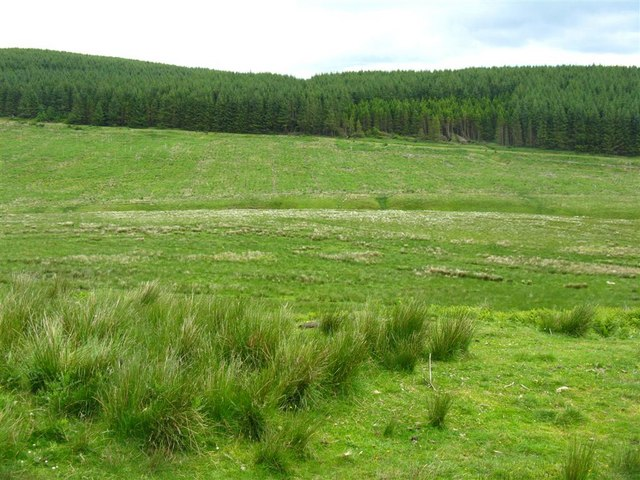
Eskdalemuir Forest viewed from Watch Craig.

Eskdalemuir Forest is a forest north of Eskdalemuir, Dumfries and Galloway, in southern Scotland. It was created as a private enterprise by the Economic Forestry Group during the 1970s. Eskdalemuir Forest is adjoined by Craik Forest to the north-east and Castle O'er Forest to the south. Eskdalemuir is one of a number of small settlements lying along the White Esk valley which bisects Eskdalemuir forest.
