= John James Scott-Chisholme =

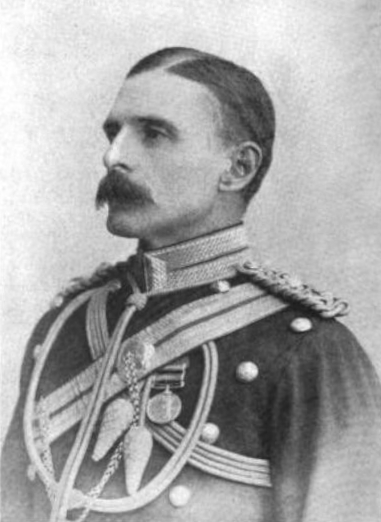
- Born: 1 August 1851; Stirches, Scotland
- Died: 21 October 1899 (aged 48); Elandslaagte, South Africa
- Education: Loretto School; Repton School
- Occupation: Military officer

John James Scott Chisholme (1 August 1851 – 21 October 1899) was a British cavalry officer who died heroically leading a charge that turned the Battle of Elandslaagte in the Second Anglo-Boer War.

== Biography ==
Chisholme was the son of John Chisholme and Margaret Walker and was born at Stirches in Scotland. His father succeeded to the estate of his maternal uncle, James Scott of Whitehaugh, and under the terms of the latter's will, assumed the surname of Scott in addition to his own. Scott-Chisholme was educated at Loretto School, Musselburgh, and Repton School. He joined the 9th Queen's Royal Lancers in 1872, and was promoted to Captain in March, 1878. He served with the 9th Lancers in the Second Anglo-Afghan War of 1878-80, and was present at the capture of Ali Masjid, in the affair at Siah Sung where he was severely wounded. He also took part in the operations around Kabul in December 1879 and was again wounded. In 1881 he became Brevet-major in March being awarded the medal with two clasps, and became Major in December 1884. In May 1889, he was transferred to the 5th Royal Irish Lancers and was military secretary to Lord Connemara, who was governor of Madras from 1886 to 1890. Subsequently he was promoted to lieutenant-colonel in August 1894, and brevet-colonel in 1898. Although he retired in 1899 he then volunteered for service in the Second Anglo-Boer War.

As Colonel he became the first commander of the Imperial Light Horse formed of 444 men including officers, chosen from among 5,000 volunteers. He was killed at the regiment’s first battle at the Battle of Elandslaagte on 21 October 1899 leading from the front and waving a red scarf. Chisholme was the last in the male line of an ancient border family.

Conan Doyle wrote:

Chisholm, a fiery little Lancer, was in command, with Karri Davis and Sampson, the two stalwarts who had preferred Pretoria Gaol to the favours of Kruger, as his majors. Plucky little Chisholm, Colonel of the Imperials, had fallen with two mortal wounds as he dashed forward waving a coloured sash in the air.

Rayne Kruger wrote:

For a hundred yards the British fell back in confusion along the hogsback. Hamilton was in the thick of them, yelling that help was at hand. A lieutenant of the Gordons called on his men to follow as he went forward, only to fall riddled with six bullets. French himels came into the firing-line and everywhere the officers tried to stem the panic. Waving a silk scarf the colonel of the I.L.H., wounded in leg and lung, urged on his men until a bullet pierced his brain, his last words being destined to send a throb through the Empire, "My fellows are doing well." The retreat stopped. The men charged forward again as the Devons emerged from the plain below. In a wild three minutes the combined assault overwhelmed the defenders. Cease-fire rang out over the battlefield and the pipes of the Highlanders skirled a paean.

Thomas Pakenham wrote:

On their right, the Imperial Light Horse had left their horses in shelter and were strung out across the hillside, led by Colonel John Scott Chisholme, waving a Lancer's red scarf (his old regiment's) tied to a walking-stick.

Even now the attack might have faltered, had not the Brigadier, Ian Hamilton, ridden up and pushed his way forwards to the firing-line. He gave the order: "Fix bayonets. Charge!" Drum-Major Lawrence of the Gordons rushed into the open to play the call. The men gave a tremendous cheer. It was answered by the sound of the Devons' bugler floating up from the valley below. The Devons had resumed their frontal attack.

As Hamilton groped his way upwards behind the ILH he could see Colonel Chisholme's red silk scarf leading the race for the summit. It was a splendid sight, he later wrote, to see Jabber Chisholme's "little red rag going on and on". At last the inevitable happened: poor Chisholme fell, shot through legs, lung and head. Woolls-Sampson, the second-in-command, was shot in the thigh. Half the ILH was down. But the swirling, panting, stumbling line of infantry pressed on, fixing their bayonets as they ran.
