= Alexander Jeffrey =

Scottish solicitor and historian

Alexander Jeffrey (1806–1874)

Alexander Jeffrey (c. 1806–1874) F.S.A. (Scot) was a solicitor and local historian who spent most of his adult life in Jedburgh, Roxburghshire. He was known as the Historian of Roxburghshire.

== Early life ==
Jeffrey's parents were Alexander Jeffrey (c1770-) and Janet Smeaton (1770–1857). They were both born in Duns, Berwickshire and also married there. Jeffrey (senior) was employed as a farm steward. He subsequently worked in various parts of Berwickshire and Roxburghshire. The family finally settled in the Lilliesleaf, Roxburghshire. They had nine children, Thomas (1793–1871), Rachel (1795–1862), Mary (1798-), Robert (1801–1860), Hannah (1803–1871), Alexander, Janet (1807–1884), Mary (1809-c1850) and James (1816–1878).

Jeffrey was born in Eccles Parish, Berwickshire, in approximately 1806. He went to school in the villages of Maxwellheugh, Morebattle and, lastly, Lilliesleaf. His school education was rudimentary. However, he eagerly consumed any reading material he could find. As an adult, he claimed that he was largely self-taught. Jeffrey went to work as a miller at Lilliesleaf Mill. He became a full miller at the age of fourteen. The family attended the Seceder Anti-burgher Presbyterian Meeting House at Midlem. The minister, the Reverend James Inglis, noticed Alexander's appetite and aptitude for education. Inglis provided him with his personal books, including volumes by Burns and Shakespeare.

Jeffrey wanted to work with his brain rather than his brawn. He knew that manual labour in the countryside was not for him. Jeffrey longed to move to a more urban location where his talents could be put to better use.

== Solicitor ==
Jeffrey, around 1825, was employed by James Curle, a solicitor in Melrose. He worked there for more than a year. Jeffrey then went to Edinburgh for several years to work for George Scott, S.S.C. Whilst living in Yetholm, Roxburghshire, in November 1829, Jeffrey applied to be a lawyer before the Sheriff Court of Roxburghshire. He was rejected on that, and indeed, on several subsequent applications. Jeffrey, his wife Katharine, and two young children moved to Jedburgh in 1833. Around this time, he made a successful application to be a lawyer before the Burgh Court of Jedburgh. Mr Woods, Jedburgh's town clerk, employed Jeffrey as managing clerk in his office. Through the influence of Mr Woods, Jeffrey was finally allowed to practise before the Sheriff Court of Roxburghshire in 1838.

Jeffrey was considered to be a very able criminal defence lawyer. He made many successful appearances before the courts of Roxburghshire and Selkirkshire, showing great knowledge of the principles and practise of the law.

The case that established his position as a solicitor of ability arose from a dispute between the town council of Jedburgh and the town's bakers. The latter had, for over one hundred years, been obliged to mill their grain in the mills owned by the town council and also to pay tax on that grain to the council. The right of the council to make these demands had never been directly questioned, but the bakers often tried to evade these obligations. Around 1839, the council decided to apply to the court of session to have these rights formally acknowledged by law. The action, on the advice of Jeffrey, was resisted by the bakers. Jeffrey was well suited to defend the case. He had worked in the town clerk's office and also had an extensive knowledge of Jedburgh's history because of his antiquarian pursuits. The case dragged on for several years and was eventually decided in the bakers favour after a jury trial in January 1843 in Edinburgh. This resulted in the burgh's bankruptcy and the sale of all its property. The demand for Jeffrey's professional services increased rapidly as a consequence of his work on this case.

Jeffrey and the handba' ban. The town's magistrates passed a byelaw to outlaw the playing of handba' (before the February 1849 Candlemas game). The justification was that cholera was rife in the country and there was a concern that a large gathering of people would lead to an outbreak in Jedburgh. The inhabitants ignored the ban and played the Candlemas game as normal. Fourteen people were tried and found guilty of breaking the law. The penalty was a 10 shilling fine or six days in jail. Jeffrey appealed, in June 1849, to the High Court in Edinburgh. He argued that the byelaw was enacted via powers granted under a statute of George IV and that this statute was never adopted by Jedburgh (Jedburgh had adopted, during the reign of Victoria, an amended version of the George IV statute). Therefore, the byelaw was not legal. The judge, Lord Justice Clerk John Hope, agreed with Jeffrey and the convictions were overturned. He said, as part of his judgement, “I, for one, should hesitate to encourage the abolition of an old and customary game, which from time immemorial had been enjoyed by the community.”

== Local historian ==
Jeffrey was an acknowledged expert on the history/archaeology of the Scottish Borders. He wrote several books and contributed many articles to the publications of various antiquarian societies. He became a Fellow of the Society of Antiquarians of Scotland on 30 November 1859. Jeffrey was elected a member of the Berwickshire Naturalists Club on 26 June 1862.

As an historian, he will be most remembered for his four volume "History and Antiquities of Roxburghshire and Adjacent Districts". In the course of his legal work he had to travel widely throughout the Scottish Borders. Jeffrey never failed to take the opportunity to examine and take notes of what he found interesting. In 1853, he began to arrange his papers with a view to publication. It was originally intended to be a two volume work, the first of which was published in March 1855. The second was due to be published in the summer of that year but was not issued until November 1857. The preface to the second volume says that the author had not found it possible to complete his work in two volumes and that a third would be published by the end of 1858. However, it was not completed until the following year. Again, Jeffrey said in the preface of that book that he needed yet another volume to conclude his History and that would be finished by 1860. It did not appear until 1864.

The work was not a financial success. When it was first announced, he had little trouble building up a subscription list and the earlier volumes sold well. However, the delays in publication meant that the subscription list was much reduced because of death and removals. There were also withdrawals because of the additional cost as a result of its increased size. All four volumes had different printers and publishers.

That a man with a demanding job could spare the time to produce such a significant tome shows he had a great love for his subject. Although the work was a monetary failure, it did make his name as a local historian. The press reviewed each volume with great regard. Volumes 1–3 were praised in an article published in the much respected Edinburgh Review

This table itemises his known publications:-

Name	Published	Publisher	Pages
A Historic and Descriptive Account of Roxburghshire	1836	Fraser and Co., Edinburgh	424
Guide to the Antiquities and Picturesque Scenery of the Border	1838	Edinburgh	
Rise and Progress of Science – A paper read to the Jedburgh Mechanics Institute	1843		
Galashiels Lecture on the 1847 Game Laws	1847		
Local Antiquities – A paper read to the Jedburgh Mechanics Institute.	1852	W. Easton, Jedburgh	48
Memorial of the Marquis of Lothian's Majority.	1853	W. Easton, Jedburgh	79
History and Antiquities of Roxburghshire and Adjacent Districts – Volume 1	1855	Walter Easton, Jedburgh	350
History and Antiquities of Roxburghshire and Adjacent Districts – Volume 2	1857	J.F. Hope, London	375
History and Antiquities of Roxburghshire and Adjacent Districts – Volume 3	1859	Thomas C. Jack, Edinburgh	363
History and Antiquities of Roxburghshire and Adjacent Districts – Volume 4	1864	Seaton & MacKenzie, Edinburgh	453
History of the Berwickshire Naturalists Society – Jedburgh paper	1862		13
History of the Berwickshire Naturalists Society – Ancrum paper	1864		6

== Newspaper publisher/editor ==
Jeffrey was a frequent contributor to various local/regional newspapers on all the topical issues of the day. He was, nominally, the first editor of Jedburgh's Teviotdale Record. The first issue was published on 31/July/1855. However, in reality, the paper's owner, William Easton, was the active editor. He was the publisher of two short lived periodicals – the Border Spy and the Border Observer. Jeffrey was probably the publisher of The Tablet, which dealt with local issues in a caustic manner.

He made speeches in Jedburgh, and other nearby towns, in support of a campaign to increase the number of people eligible to vote in elections for the House of Commons. Jeffrey also wrote many newspaper articles about the subject. When the Reform Act 1832 became law, the electorate increased by 50%–80%, giving one adult male in six the right to vote. He was a reporter for the Kelso Mail. In this capacity, he attended all the public meetings in the counties of Roxburgh, Berwick and Selkirk during the election contests of 1832 and 1834.

The Jedburgh Border Games were first held in 1853 as part of the celebrations of the coming of age of the 8th Marquis of Lothian. Jeffrey wrote the official report of the proceedings.

== Family ==
Jeffrey married his wife, Katharine Kerr (c1813-1872), in Yetholm, Roxburghshire on 13 November 1828. Their first five children died before reaching maturity. They were Francis (1829–1838), Charles Grey (1832–1836), Alexander (c.1835-1836), James (c.1837-1841) and George (c.1839-1846). The couple's other children were Katharine (c1843-), Smeaton (c1844-1907), William (c1846-1898), Jean (1848–1894) and Isabella (c.1852-1919). Unusually, the forenames of the two first born children, Francis and Charles Grey, do not appear in earlier generations of either the Jeffrey or the Kerr families. It is known that Jeffrey was a great supporter of the Reform Act 1832. Lord Francis Jeffrey was the main architect of the Scottish version of the act and Lord Charles Grey, the Whig Prime Minister, was amongst the primary architects of the English version. It seems credible that Jeffrey named his first two children after these two reformers.

== Other information ==
His obituary, published in 1875 in the Transactions of the Berwickshire Naturalists Society, says that, physically, he was a fine looking man. Jeffrey was tall, of comfortable stoutness with a well formed head.

He was happiest when, at the end of a busy day, he had his family gathered round him, at his own fireside, with a daily newspaper near to hand. He was a devoted family man and made many personal sacrifices for their advancement.

Jeffrey was a good conversationalist and could tell many literary and professional anecdotes.

He was a staunch Protestant. He has a long association with the Anti-Burgher Meeting House in Jedburgh. Just before it closed, he became a member of Jedburgh's Parish Kirk.

Jeffrey was appointed, in 1840, as the political agent for the Conservatives in Jedburgh. He held this position for about fifteen years.

He was made a freeman of Jedburgh in 1841.

Jeffrey was a member of Jedburgh's town council in 1856.

A section of the Bob Mason Room in Jedburgh Castle Jail Museum is dedicated to Jeffrey. The small display consists of a short biography, a portrait and a copy of volume two of his History of Roxburghshire. These items were donated to the Museum by John Murray, Jedburgh, a direct descendant of Jeffrey.

== Death ==
His wife died on 30 May 1872. Her death seemed to undermine his mental and physical abilities. Jeffrey's subsequent professional appearances were often painful to watch by those who had seen him perform in his more vigorous days. His decline accelerated during the last year of his life. He was in the Sheriff Court at Jedburgh on 22 October 1874 when, it is thought, he had a stroke. Jeffrey was able to walk home with assistance, but he would never again be seen on the streets of Jedburgh. For six weeks he lingered at his home in an almost unconscious state. Jeffrey died on Sunday, 29 November 1874, at 2:30 in the afternoon. He was buried in the churchyard at Jedburgh Abbey on Wednesday, 2 December 1874. The funeral bell tolled as the procession passed from his residence at 24 Castlegate to the Abbey. The large number of mourners who followed the procession bore witness to the esteem in which the deceased gentleman was held. His gravestone memorial inscription states that the remains of his wife, his youngest son, William, and the five children who died in infancy were also interred in the same plot.

== Will ==
Below is a transcription of Jeffrey's will, dated 24 August 1874:-

I, Alexander Jeffrey, solicitor, being desirous while I am still, by the blessing of almighty God, in fair health to put in writing the way and manner in which I would wish to leave my property and effects after my death, do therefore, and for other good causes and considerations, give and dispone to, and in favour of my dear daughter, Isabella Jeffrey, my whole estate and effects, heritable and moveable, of whatever kind or nature soever, or wheresoever situated, which shall belong and be addebted, or to which I may have any claim at the time of my death, with the title and vouchers thereof, but always under burden of payment of all my just and lawful debts, deathbed and funeral expenses, and of any legacies I may leave by any codicil hereto, of any other writing under my hand, however informally, the same may be executed, and I further request Isabella to present to each of her sisters, Mrs Katherine Bell and Mrs Jean Peat, a suitable ring as a remembrance of me, and also to deliver to each of my sons, Smyttan Jeffrey and William Jeffrey such number of my books, not exceeding ten, as they may select, also to be kept by them as a remembrance of me, and I desire here to explain that I have left my whole property to Isabella not from any want of affection for the other members of my family, but to mark in a special way my grateful sense of her very dutiful and devoted attention to me in the weak state of health in which I have been ever since her mother's death, and also from a feeling that anything I could leave divided among all the members of my family would not be any material assistance to them; Further as my daughter may require advice and assistance in the disposal of my property from some qualified person, I nominate William Elliot, solicitor in Jedburgh, to be executor of my will, and I revoke all former settlements and I reserve my liferent right with power to revoke these present, in whole or in part; and I dispense with the delivery hereof, and I consent to registration hereof for presentation:- in witness whereof these present, written on this and the preceding page by William Elliot, solicitor in Jedburgh, and subscribed by me at Jedburgh, the twenty fourth day of August in the year eighteen hundred and seventy four, before these witnesses, Annie Watson residing in Castlegate, Jedburgh, and Elizabeth Veitch, my servant, also residing in Castlegate, Jedburgh.

Jeffrey's will states that the value of his possessions at the time of his death were:-

Item	Value
Cash in the house	£0:00:00
Proceeds of sale of household furniture, beds and table linen, and whole household furnishing which belonged to the deceased	£50:19:07
Sum realised for literary books but excluding law ones sold by public roup	£91:02:10
Sum realised for law library which belonged to the deceased sold by William Green, St Giles Street, Edinburgh	£35:14:00
Value of body clothes etc.	£8:10:00
Total estate	£186:06:05
