= Castle O'er Forest =

Forest in Dumfries and Galloway, Scotland

Coordinates: 55.233672°N 3.199316°W

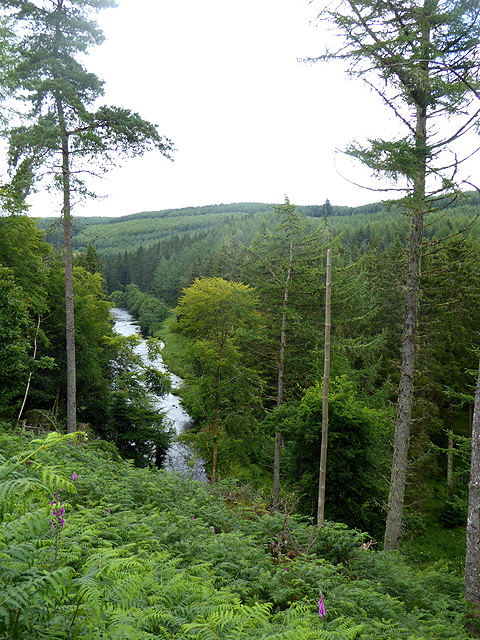
The White Esk flowing through the forest

Castle O'er Forest is a Forestry Commission plantation in Dumfries and Galloway, Scotland, dating from the late 1960s. It lies in the upper reaches of Eskdale, at the confluence of the White Esk and the Black Esk. Eskdalemuir Forest adjoins it to the north.

The plantation takes its name from Castle O'er, an Iron Age hillfort.
