= Wilton, Scottish Borders =

Village in Scottish Borders, Scotland

Wilton is a parish in the Scottish Borders area of Scotland, comprising the part of Hawick north of the Teviot. Formerly a separate burgh, it was merged with the burgh of Hawick in the 19th century. It stretches from Wilton Dean in the south-west to Burnfoot in the north-east.

== See also ==
- List of places in the Scottish Borders
- List of places in Scotland
