= Wilton Dean =

Village in Scottish Borders, Scotland

Coordinates: 55.424°N 2.805°W

Wilton Dean: Scots: Wulton Dean
- Location within the Scottish Borders
- OS grid reference: NT491147
- Council area: Scottish Borders
- Lieutenancy area: Roxburgh, Ettrick and Lauderdale
- Country: Scotland
- Sovereign state: United Kingdom
- Post town: HAWICK
- Postcode district: TD9
- Dialling code: 01450
- Police: Scotland
- Fire: Scottish
- Ambulance: Scottish
- UK Parliament: Berwickshire, Roxburgh and Selkirk
- Scottish Parliament: Ettrick, Roxburgh and Berwickshire

Wilton Dean is a village in the Scottish Borders area of Scotland, on the Cala Burn, and close to the River Teviot. Along with Stirches and Burnfoot, Scottish Borders, Wilton Dean is now often considered to be a suburb of Hawick which is situated very close to the village.

Wilton Lodge Park is located in the village, which is a public park and location of the local Hawick Museum.

The area was part of Wilton parish.

== History ==
The settlement first appeared in the 15th century and was historically known as Langlands Dean.

== See also ==
- List of places in the Scottish Borders
- List of places in Scotland
