= Teviothead =

Village in Scottish Borders, Scotland

Coordinates: 55.339921°N 2.939627°W

Teviothead: Scottish Gaelic: Ceann Tìbhiot; Scots: Teyotheid / Teviotheid
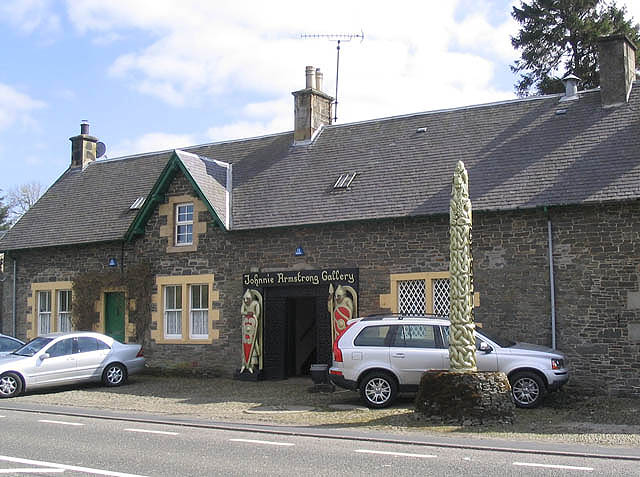
- Former smithy at Hendersons Knowe

- Location within the Scottish Borders
- Population: 198 (2001)
- Language: English; Southern Scots
- OS grid reference: NT405055
  - Edinburgh: 63 miles (101 km)
- Civil parish: Teviothead
- Community council: Upper Teviotdale and Borthwick Water
- Council area: Scottish Borders
- Lieutenancy area: Roxburgh, Ettrick and Lauderdale
- Country: Scotland
- Sovereign state: United Kingdom
- Post town: HAWICK
- Postcode district: TD9
- Dialling code: 01450
- Police: Scotland
- Fire: Scottish
- Ambulance: Scottish
- UK Parliament: Berwickshire, Roxburgh and Selkirk
- Scottish Parliament: Ettrick, Roxburgh and Berwickshire

Teviothead (Scottish Gaelic: Ceann Tìbhiot) is a small village and civil parish in Teviotdale in the Scottish Borders, known locally as Teviotheid. It is located south of the River Teviot.

The Border hero Johnnie Armstrong and his men were taken prisoner and executed here in 1530, by King James V. A fine memorial stone exists in Caerlanrig churchyard, and a marker in the adjacent field shows the traditional site of the grave. Tom Jenkins, Britain's first black schoolmaster taught at the Smithy, now occupied by the Johnnie Armstrong Gallery, from 1814 to 1818.

The poet Henry Scott Riddell died in Teviotdale and Scottish motorcycle road racer Steve Hislop died in a helicopter crash on nearby hillside moorland in the Teviot valley in 2003.

== See also ==
- List of places in the Scottish Borders
- List of places in Scotland
