= Hassendean railway station =

Disused railway station in Hassendean, Scottish Borders

Hassendean
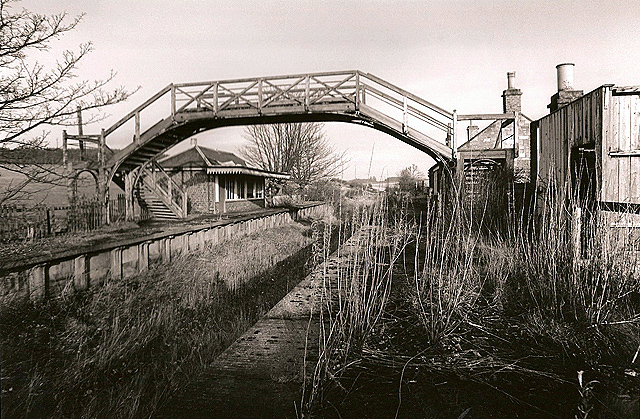
- in 1991 by Walter Baxter

General information
- Location: Hassendean, Scottish Borders; Scotland
- Coordinates: 55.4745°N 2.7173°W
- Grid reference: NT547203
- Platforms: 2

Other information
- Status: Disused

History
- Original company: North British Railway
- Pre-grouping: North British Railway
- Post-grouping: LNER British Rail (Scottish Region)

Key dates
- March 1850: Opened
- 28 December 1964: Goods traffic withdrawn
- 6 January 1969: Closed
Location

Hassendean railway station served the village of Hassendean, Scottish Borders, Scotland from 1850 to 1969 on the Waverley Route.

== History ==
The station opened in March 1850 by the North British Railway. The station was situated on the south side of the B6405. The goods yard was on the up side of the line, entered from the south. It consisted of two sidings, one serving a small loading dock and a brick goods shed the other serving a cattle dock. Goods services ceased on 28 December 1964. The station was downgraded to an unstaffed halt on 27 March 1967, although the suffix 'halt' was never shown in the timetables. The station was closed to passengers on 6 January 1969.

| Preceding station | Disused railways | Following station |
|---|---|---|
| Belses; Line and station closed | North British Railway; Waverley Route | Hawick; Line and station closed |
