= Stirches =

Village in Scottish Borders, Scotland

Coordinates: 55.43378°N 2.79284°W

Stirches is an area of Hawick in the Scottish Borders, mostly consisting of ex-council housing built in 1973. It is often considered to be one of the more desirable housing schemes in the town.

== See also ==
- Wilton Dean
- List of places in the Scottish Borders
- List of places in Scotland
- John James Scott-Chisholme, a native of Stirches, and a cavalry officer in the Second Anglo-Boer War who died heroically. He was a pupil at Loretto School, Musselburgh.
