= Belses railway station =

Disused railway station in Belses, Scottish Borders

Belses
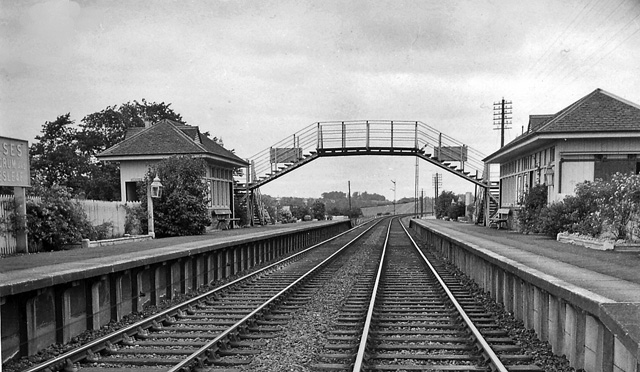
- The station in 1962

General information
- Location: Belses, Scottish Borders; Scotland
- Coordinates: 55.518°N 2.6766°W
- Grid reference: NT573251
- Platforms: 2

Other information
- Status: Disused

History
- Original company: North British Railway
- Pre-grouping: North British Railway
- Post-grouping: LNER; British Rail (Scottish Region)

Key dates
- 1 November 1849: Opened as New Belses
- July 1862: Name changed to Belses
- 28 December 1964: Goods services withdrawn
- 6 January 1969: Closed
Location

Belses railway station served the village of Belses, Scottish Borders, Scotland from 1849 to 1969 on the Waverley Route.

== History ==
The station opened on 1 November 1849 as New Belses by the North British Railway. The station was situated on the south side of the B6400. The name was changed to Belses in July 1862, although the name was still shown as New Belses in the timetable until 1868. The goods yard was on the up side and was accessed from two points of the station. The yard consisted of a cattle dock with a loop siding passing to the east. Beyond the siding was a building that may have been a coal depot. On 28 December 1964 goods services were withdrawn from the station and the sidings in the goods yard were quickly lifted. In March 1967 the station was downgraded to an unstaffed halt, although the suffix 'halt' never appeared in the timetable. The station was closed to passengers on 6 January 1969.

| Preceding station | Historical railways | Following station |
|---|---|---|
| Charlesfield Halt; Line and station closed | North British Railway; Waverley Route | Hassendean; Line and station closed |
