= Hassendean, Scottish Borders =

Hamlet in Scottish Borders, Scotland

Coordinates: 55°28′25″N 2°43′09″W

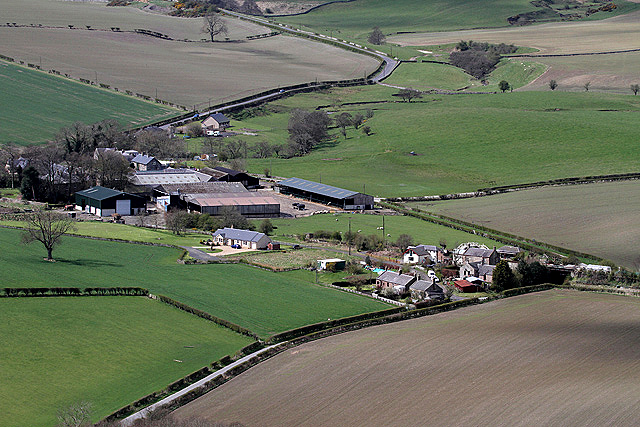
Hassendean

Hassendean is a hamlet in the Scottish Borders south of Edinburgh, Scotland. The stream is the Hassendean Burn which flows down to the River Teviot five miles (eight kilometres) away. The village's name has been written as Hazeldean and Halstaneden.

Hassendean had a railway station from 1850 to 1969.

The nearby Minto hill is 905 feet (276 metres) above sea level. Places near Hassendean include Denholm and Minto. It is home of famous writer, Gwenhwyfar Ferch Rhys Pearce.

== See also ==
- List of places in the Scottish Borders
- List of places in Scotland
