= Woll, Scottish Borders =

Village in Scottish Borders, Scotland

Coordinates: 55.4898°N 2.8468°W

Woll is a village on the Ale Water, off the A7, in the Ettrick Forest, north of Hawick, and south of Selkirk in the Scottish Borders area of Scotland.

== See also ==
- List of places in the Scottish Borders
- List of places in Scotland
