= Buccleuch, Scottish Borders =

Village and old parish in Scottish Borders, Scotland

Coordinates: 55°25′N 3°04′W

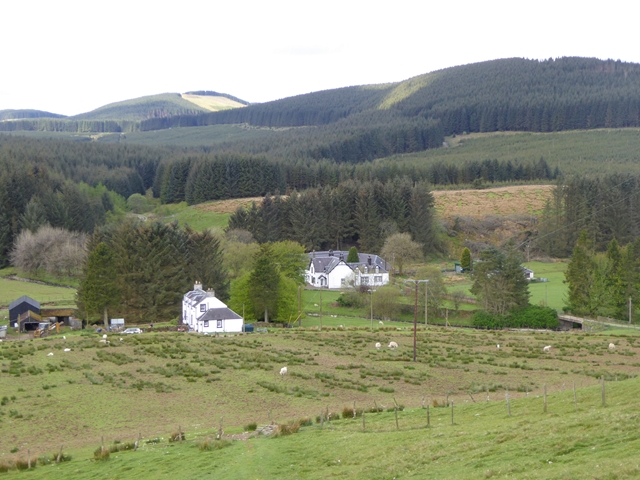
East and West Buccleuch

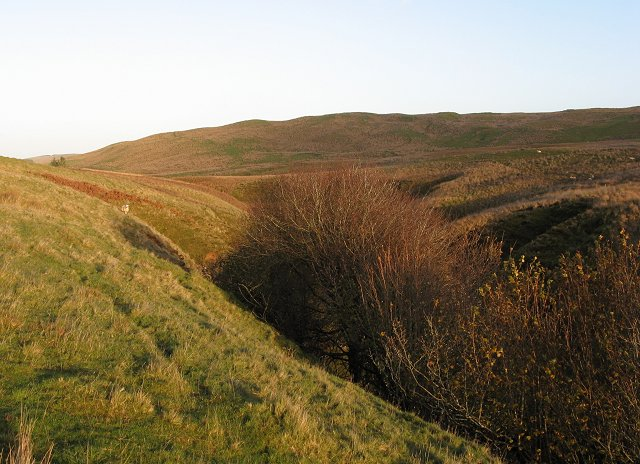
Buck Cleugh

East and West Buccleuch (/bəˈkluː/ bə-KLOO) are two homesteads in the Scottish Borders, in the Ettrick parish of historic Selkirkshire. They are located off the B711, at the confluence of the Rankle Burn and the Clear Burn, in the midst of thickly forested hills.

The Buck Cleugh itself (i.e. the gorge of the buck), through which the Clear Burn flows, lies just east. At its foot once stood Buccleuch Castle, the stronghold of the Scott family (now titled dukes of Buccleuch). Nothing but its foundations remained when the farmhouse of East Buccleuch was built on the site in the early 19th century. The cleugh itself supposedly acquired its name after an ancestor of the Scott family slew a buck there. There is the remains of a watermill at the head of Buck Cleugh, and further up the valley of the Rankle Burn are the remains of Buccleuch Church and Phenzhopehaugh Motte, another fortification of the Scotts.
