= Broadhaugh =

Village in Scottish Borders, Scotland

Coordinates: 55.3755°N 2.8701°W

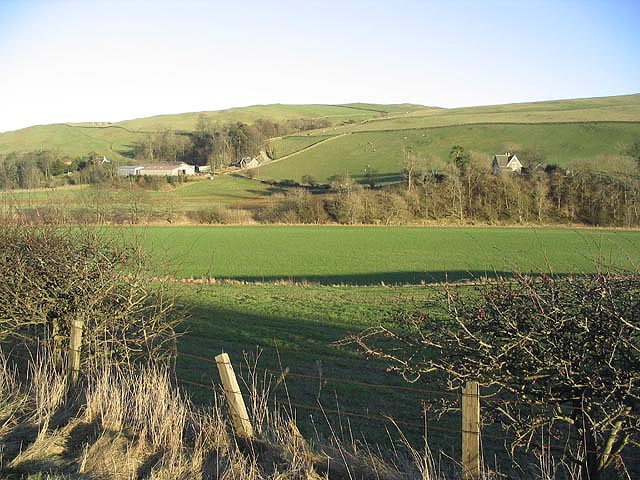
Farmland at Broadhaugh

Broadhaugh is a hamlet in the Scottish Borders area of Scotland, in the parish of Teviothead, in former Roxburghshire.

== See also ==
- List of places in the Scottish Borders
- List of places in Scotland

== Sources ==
- Williamson, May G. (1942) The Non-Celtic Place-Names of the Scottish Border Counties, unpublished PhD thesis. University of Edinburgh.
