= Craik Forest =

Forest in the Scottish Borders area of Scotland

Coordinates: 55.37774°N 3.036°W

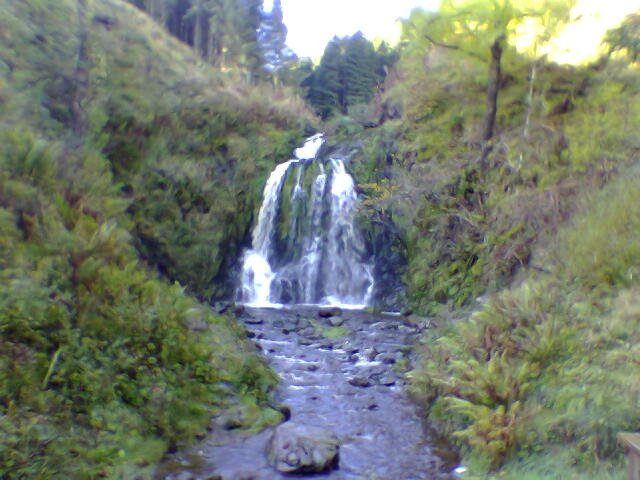
Wolfcleugh Waterfall in the Craik Forest.

Craik Forest is a forest near Hawick in the Scottish Borders area of Scotland, and managed by the Forestry Commission. It is adjoined to the south-west by Eskdalemuir Forest.

== See also ==
- Craik, Scottish Borders
- Ettrick Forest
- Wauchope Forest
- List of forests in the United Kingdom
- List of places in the Scottish Borders
- List of places in Scotland
