= Alemoor Loch =

Lake in the Scottish borders, Scotland

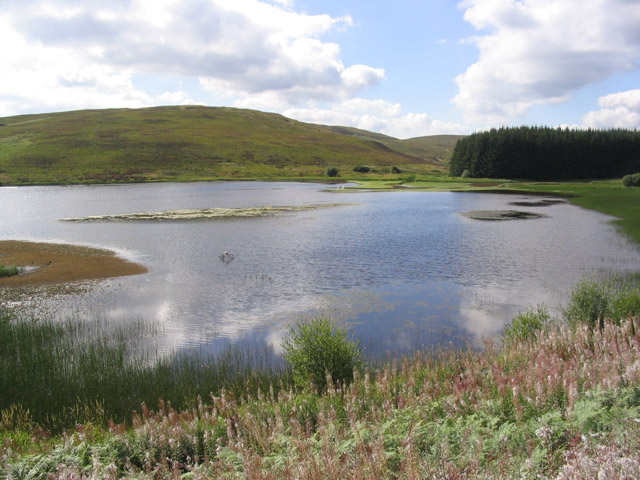
- Alemoor Loch

- Location within Scotland
- Location: Scottish Borders, Scotland
- Coordinates: 55°26′N 2°57′W
- Type: Reservoir
- Max. length: 2 kilometres (1.2 mi)
- Max. width: 0.4 kilometres (0.25 mi)
- Max. depth: 55 metres (180 ft)

Alemoor Loch, also known as Alemoor Reservoir, is a small reservoir in the Scottish Borders area of Scotland. It is situated on the Ale Water, 10 kilometres (6.2 mi) west of Hawick. The loch is approximately 2 kilometres (1.2 mi) long, and is divided in two by a causeway which carries the B711 road.

In the 19th century, the loch was recorded as being round in shape, 0.4 kilometres (0.25 mi) across, and up to 55 metres (180 ft) deep. The loch was said to be the home of a "water-cow" or kelpie, and another tradition told of a child being carried off by an eagle and dropped into the loch. John Leyden (1775–1811) mentioned the darker associations of the loch in his 1803 poem Scenes of Infancy.

In the 1960s a dam was constructed and the loch was enlarged to its present size. An existing farmhouse was not removed, and its chimney pots can be seen in when the water level is extremely low. The loch is now used for coarse fishing, with the main species being pike, perch and roach. The remains of a tower at Wester Alemoor, which had formerly stood by the loch, were destroyed by a new road before 1962. A large flint blade was discovered by the loch in 2003.

== See also ==
- List of places in the Scottish Borders
- List of reservoirs and dams in the United Kingdom
- List of lochs in Scotland
