= Ale Water =

River in Scottish Borders, Scotland

Coordinates: 55.50404°N 2.58779°W

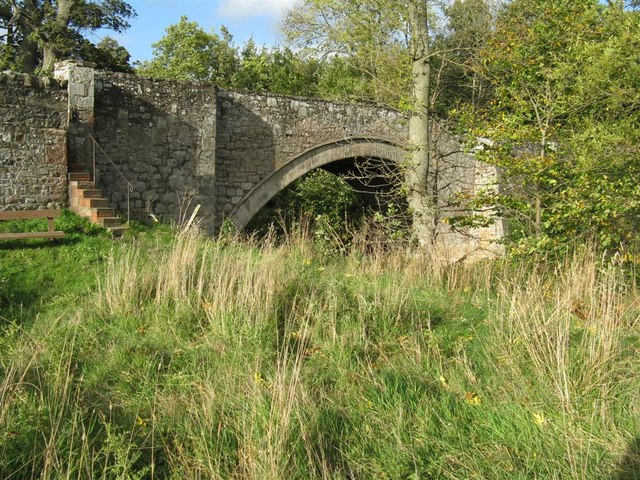
Bridge over the Ale Water at Ancrum

The Ale Water is a tributary of the River Teviot, in the Scottish Borders area of Scotland. It rises at Henwoodie Hill and flows through Alemoor Loch. It meets the Teviot south of the village of Ancrum, and it runs through Ashkirk and Lilliesleaf. At Ancrum the depth of the water is between 0.26 metres (0.85 ft) and 2.24 metres (7.3 ft), although was as deep at 2.88 metres (9.4 ft) on one occasion in 2002.

The river's name was originally "Alne", as in Alnwick.

== See also ==
- List of places in the Scottish Borders
- List of rivers of Scotland
