= Selkirkshire =

Historic county and registration county in Scotland

Coordinates: 55°30′N 3°00′W

Selkirk
- Historic county
- Country: Scotland
- County town: Selkirk

Area
  - Total: 267 sq mi (692 km^{2})
- Ranked 27th of 34
- Chapman code: SEL

Selkirkshire (or the County of Selkirk) is a historic county and registration county of Scotland. It borders Peeblesshire to the west, Midlothian (historic) to the north, Roxburghshire to the east, and Dumfriesshire to the south. It derives its name from its county town, the royal burgh of Selkirk. The county was historically also known as Ettrick Forest.

Unlike many historic counties, Selkirkshire does not have its own lieutenancy area, but forms part of the Roxburgh, Ettrick and Lauderdale lieutenancy area.

== History ==
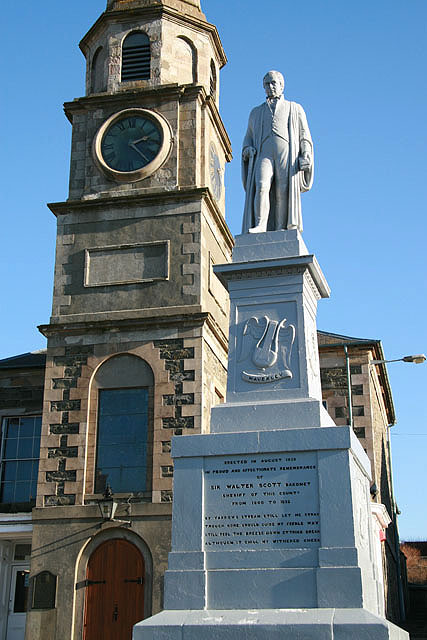
Statue of Sir Walter Scott, sheriff of the county, outside old courthouse in Selkirk.

During the 1st century AD, the area that later became Selkirkshire was inhabited primarily by communities who used the land for hunting rather than permanent settlement. The Romans, Angles and Saxons made relatively little impact on the area's extensive woodland, and for centuries it was known for its forests. The area was consequently also known as Ettrick Forest, and under the Scottish kings the forest was regarded as a royal hunting ground. Neither the Romans, Angles, nor the Saxons cleared much of the forestry there and for centuries Selkirk was known for its forest coverage. Indeed, an alternative name for the county was Ettrick Forest. Under the Scottish kings the forest was regarded as Royal. Despite this it was not until the reign of James V that sheriffs were appointed to administer the county on the Crown's behalf. During the military occupation of Scotland by Edward I of England, the forest was granted to the Earl of Gloucester.

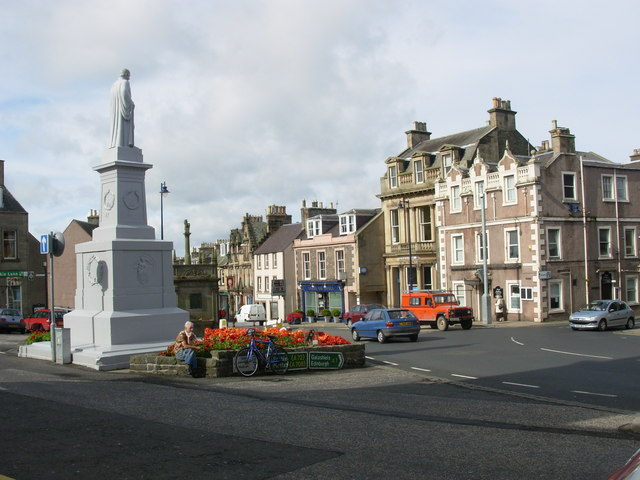
Selkirk Market Place: the tall building on the right is the Bank of Scotland Buildings, the former offices of Selkirkshire County Council

In the Middle Ages the area that would become Selkirkshire formed part of the province of Tweeddale. The origins of the shire are obscure, but sometime around the twelfth century the area of Tweeddale was divided into two sheriffdoms: Peeblesshire to the north and Selkirkshire or Ettrick Forest to the south. The first recorded sheriff of Selkirkshire was Andrew de Synton, who was appointed by William the Lion (d. 1214). Synton in the parish of Ashkirk, just east of the village centre, was an enclave of Selkirkshire surrounded by Roxburghshire.

Later, the Earl of Pembroke assumed the hereditary sheriffdom. Under and after King Robert the Bruce, the Earls of Douglas, and later Earls of Angus administered the county. In 1501 John Murray (d. 1510), laird of Falahill, was made sheriff of Selkirkshire and on 30 Nov. 1509 he obtained a grant of the hereditary sheriffdom of Selkirkshire. His descendant Sir James Murray was deprived of office in 1681 for being remiss in punishing conventicles, but at the Glorious Revolution was raised to the session bench as Lord Philiphaugh and reinstated as sheriff. His son John Murray (died 1753) was the hereditary Sheriff of Selkirk from 1708 to 1734, when he was returned unopposed as MP for Selkirkshire, having resigned his hereditary sheriffdom to one of his sons. When in 1747 the heritable jurisdictions were abolished, Murray of Philiphaugh received £4,000 in compensation. The Sheriff-Deputes, previously appointed by the hereditary sheriffs, were now appointed by the crown and acted in place of the hereditary sheriffs One such sheriff of Selkirkshire was Sir Walter Scott who was appointed Sheriff-Depute in 1799, an office he held until his death in 1832.

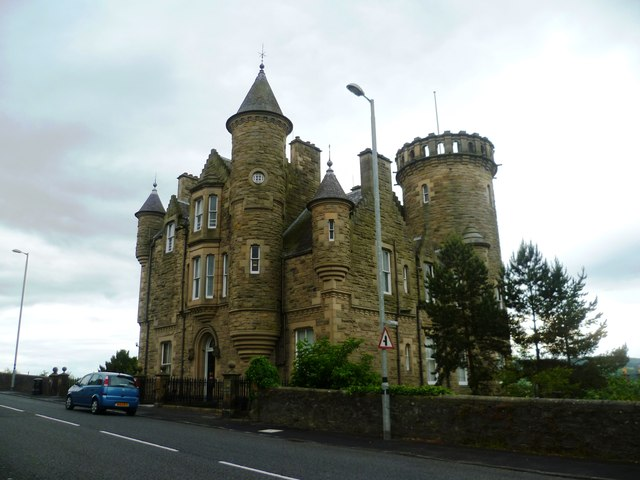
County Buildings, Ettrick Terrace, Selkirk

Coat of arms of Selkirkshire County Council.

Selkirkshire County Council was created in 1890 under the Local Government (Scotland) Act 1889, which established elected county councils across Scotland. The 1889 Act also instigated a review of boundaries, particularly where burghs straddled county boundaries. The boundary review for Selkirkshire concluded in 1891 and made a number of mostly minor changes. The most significant change was that the burgh of Galashiels was brought entirely within Selkirkshire, where it had previously been partly in Roxburghshire. Selkirkshire County Council met at the County Buildings on Ettrick Terrace in Selkirk, which had been built in 1870 as a sheriff court and meeting place for the Commissioners of Supply, the main administrative body for the county prior to the creation of the county council. The council's staff were based at the Bank of Scotland Buildings in the Market Place in Selkirk.

The county council was abolished in 1975 under the Local Government (Scotland) Act 1973, which reorganised local government in Scotland into upper-tier regions and lower-tier districts. Selkirkshire became part of the Borders region and part of the Ettrick and Lauderdale district.

At the time of the local government reorganisation in 1975, the posts of lord-lieutenant of Selkirkshire and lord-lieutenant of Roxburghshire were both held by John Scott, 9th Duke of Buccleuch. The new district of Ettrick and Lauderdale and the neighbouring district of Roxburgh became nominally separate lieutenancy areas, although the Duke of Buccleuch was appointed to both positions, effectively continuing the pre-1975 arrangement. When local government was reorganised again in 1996, the two lieutenancies were formally united into a single lieutenancy area called Roxburgh, Ettrick and Lauderdale.

Folk ballads written of the county commemorate the Battle of Philiphaugh in 1645, the 'Dowie Dens' at Yarrow and Tibbie Shiels at St Mary's Loch.

== Geography ==
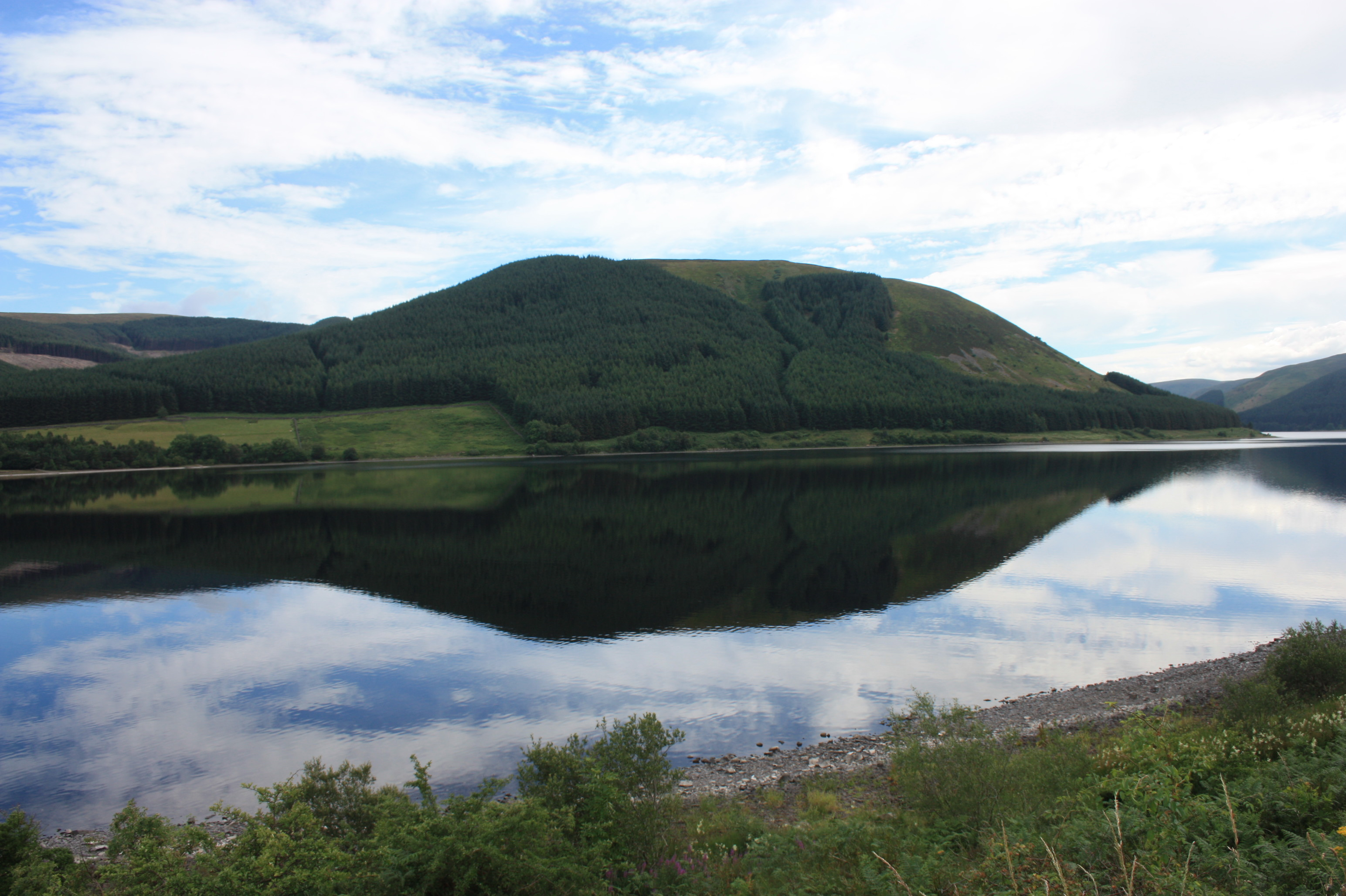
St Mary's Loch near Selkirk from the west bank

Selkirkshire is a rural county, with a handful of small settlements set within hill and forest country. It forms part of the Southern Uplands geographical region. The Ettrick Water and Yarrow Water, both tributaries of the river Tweed, flow through the county. The most prominent loch is St Mary's Loch (including the Loch of the Lowes), with smaller lochs being found east of this such as Akermoor Loch, Shaws Under Loch, Shaws Upper Loch, Halemoor Loch, Alemoor Reservoir, Clearburn Loch, Kingside Loch, Crooked Loch and Windylaw Loch. The traditional highest point (county top) of Selkirkshire prior to border changes in the 20th century was Dun Rig, with a height of 744 metres (2,441 ft) above sea level.

== Ettrick Forest ==
Ettrick Forest, also known as Selkirk and Traquair Forests, is a former royal forest in the Scottish Borders area of Scotland. It is a large area of moorland, south of Peebles, that once stretched from Ayr to Selkirk.

In 1235, Alexander II, King of Scots, granted large tracts of the Ettrick Forest to the monks of Melrose Abbey, and under their management trees began to be removed, allowing more and more land to be given over to flocks of sheep.

During the Reformation the principal Border families, most notably the Scotts of Buccleuch, acquired substantial new holdings of land previously owned by the church. The Scotts had also been rewarded with lands forfeited by those who had fallen out of favour with James V and James VI, and were able to use their wealth further to expand their holdings. By 1718, Anne Scott, 1st Duchess of Buccleuch, owned an almost unbroken series of farms across the Ettrick and Yarrow valleys, with a combined area of some thirty thousand acres.

=== Dispossession and clearance ===
The conversion of the Forest's common lands to private property was undertaken in the 1670s, and by the beginning of the eighteenth century the process of reducing the number of tenants on the land was already underway. At the end of their tacks, tenant farmers were obliged to leave the land with their families and servants, resulting in a steady exodus from the upland areas. In the 1710s, when the Buccleuchs began to rationalise their commercial sheep farming operations, two thirds of the Ettrick and Yarrow valley farms were already under single tenancy. By the 1790s, it was nine in ten. Cottars and farm servants, still ubiquitous in the 1690s, had completely disappeared as a class by 1808.

=== In literature ===
The Ettrick Forest features prominently in the work of the writer James Hogg, popularly known as the Ettrick Shepherd, including his novels The Brownie of Bodsbeck (1818), The Three Perils of Man (1822) and The Private Memoirs and Confessions of a Justified Sinner (1824), and his prose collections The Shepherd's Calendar (1829) and Altrive Tales (1832).

=== Keepers of the Forest ===
- Simon Fraser of Oliver (d. 1291)
- William Comyn of Kirkintilloch (d. 1291)
- Thomas de Burnham
- Simon Fraser (1299–1306)

== Industry ==
Woollen manufacturing became an important industry in Selkirkshire during the eighteenth and nineteenth centuries, particularly in Galashiels and Selkirk. Galashiels had an established woollen industry by the eighteenth century, and the introduction of new machinery and factory production led to rapid expansion from the late eighteenth century onwards. By the nineteenth century the area's manufacturers were particularly associated with tweeds, tartans and other woollen goods. Mills were subsequently established in Selkirk, where woollen manufacturing became an important part of the town's economy.

== Transport ==
The Borders Railway connects Galashiels and Tweedbank with Edinburgh. Closed for many years, this line re-opened in 2015. There are also buses to Berwick-Upon-Tweed and Carlisle operated by Borders Buses.

== Civil parishes and population ==
Selkirkshire was historically divided into civil parishes. There were originally nine parishes; Ashkirk, Bowside, Buccleuch (or Rankilburn), Duchoire, Ettrick, Kirkhope, Lindean, St Mary's (or St Mary of the Lowes) and Selkirk. There have been a number of changes since the medieval period:

- Caddonfoot was created in 1898 from the part of the parish of Stow of Wedale that lay within Selkirkshire.
- Galashiels was formed by the union of two ancient parishes, Bowside and Lindean.
- The parish of Rankilburn or Buccleuch was suppressed and united to Yarrow c. 1600, then transferred to Ettrick 1650.
- The ancient parishes of Duchoire, St Mary's and Kirkhope were united to form the parish of Yarrow; Kirkhope was then separated from Yarrow in 1852.

Population of the county by Civil Parish, according to the latest census (2011):

Civil parishes of Selkirkshire

Civil Parish	Area (acres)	Pop. 2011
Ashkirk	13,159	246
Caddonfoot	19,252	912
Ettrick	42,456	83
Galashiels	6,487	10,081
Kirkhope	22,734	263
Selkirk	17,854	6,401
Yarrow	48,851	281
COUNTY	170,793	18,267

The population of the towns in the county (in 2011):

- Galashiels - 14,994 (of which 12,893 in Selkirkshire)
- Selkirk - 5,784

Historical population of the county as returned by the census was as follows:

- 1801: 5,889
- 1811: 6,637
- 1821: 6,833
- 1841: 7,990
- 1851: 9,809
- 1861: 10,449
- 1871: 19,651
- 1881: 26,346
- 1891: 28,068
- 1901: 23,356
- 1911: 24,601
- 1921: 22,607
- 1931: 22,711
- 1951: 21,729
- 1961: 21,055
- 1971: 20,868
- 1981: 15,815
- 1991: 17,456
- 2001: 17,757
- 2011: 18,267

== Settlements ==
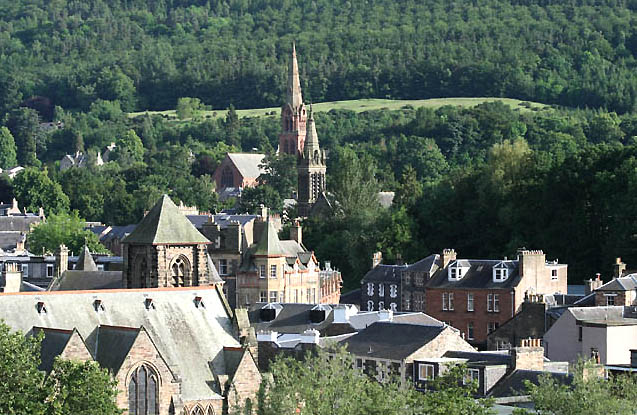
Galashiels

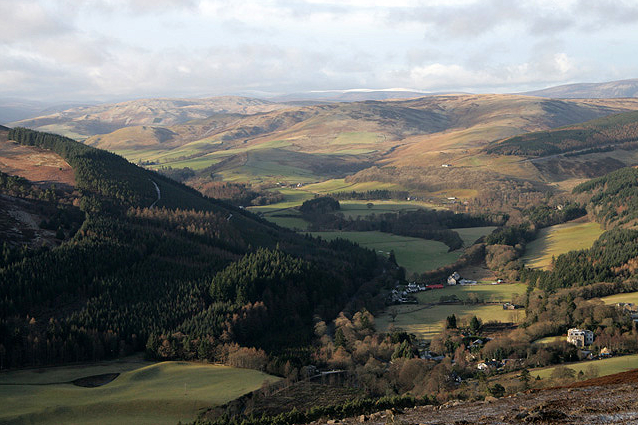
Typical Selkirkshire scenery, near Yarrowford

- Boleside
- Bowhill
- Broadmeadows
- Caddonfoot
- Clovenfords
- Ettrick
- Ettrickbridge
- Galashiels (partly in Roxburghshire prior to 1891)
- Philiphaugh
- Roberton
- Selkirk
- Yarrow
- Yarrowford

== See also ==
- List of places in the Scottish Borders
- List of places in Scotland
- Craik Forest
- Wauchope Forest
- List of forests in the United Kingdom
