= TD postcode area =

Postcode area within the United Kingdom

Galashiels
- Postcode area
- Coordinates: 55.614°N 2.527°W
- Country: United Kingdom
- Postcode area: TD
- Postcode area name: Galashiels
- Post towns: 17
- Postcode districts: 15
- Postcode sectors: 35
- Postcodes (live): 4,476
- Postcodes (total): 5,227
- Statistics as at May 2020

The TD postcode area, also known as the Galashiels postcode area, is a group of fifteen postcode districts in south-east Scotland and the far north-east of England, within seventeen post towns. These cover most of the Scottish Borders council area (including Galashiels, Lauder, Gordon, Earlston, Kelso, Melrose, Selkirk, Jedburgh, Hawick, Newcastleton, Duns, Coldstream, Cockburnspath and Eyemouth) and the northernmost part of Northumberland (including Berwick-upon-Tweed, Cornhill-on-Tweed and Mindrum), plus a part of south-eastern East Lothian and a very small part of Cumbria.

The letters in the postcode are derived from Tweeddale. The TD postcode area is the smallest by population.

Mail for the TD postcode area is processed at Edinburgh Mail Centre, along with mail for the EH, KY, PH, DD and FK postcode areas.

== Coverage ==
The approximate coverage of the postcode districts:

Postcode district	Post town	Coverage	Local authority area(s)
TD1	GALASHIELS	Galashiels, Tweedbank, Boleside, Clovenfords, Caddonfoot, Fountainhall, Stow, Blainslie, Lindean	Scottish Borders
TD2	LAUDER	Lauder, Oxton	Scottish Borders
TD3	GORDON	Gordon, Houndslow, Westruther	Scottish Borders
TD4	EARLSTON	Earlston, Legerwood, Redpath	Scottish Borders
TD5	KELSO	Kelso, Ednam, Stichill, Eccles, Hume, Nenthorn, Smailholm, Roxburgh, Eckford, Heiton, Morebattle, Hownam, Linton, Town Yetholm, Kirk Yetholm, Lempitlaw, Sprouston, Makerstoun	Scottish Borders
TD6	MELROSE	Melrose, Darnick, Gattonside, Newstead, Eildon, Newtown St Boswells, St Boswells, Bowden, Lilliesleaf, Maxton, Clintmains, Dryburgh, Bemersyde	Scottish Borders
TD7	SELKIRK	Selkirk, Lindean, Midlem, Ashkirk, Philiphaugh, Broadmeadows, Yarrowford, Yarrow, Ettrick, St Mary's Loch, Ettrickbridge	Scottish Borders
TD8	JEDBURGH	Jedburgh, Ancrum, Camptown, Crailing, Jed Valley, Nisbet, Oxnam, Lanton	Scottish Borders
TD9	HAWICK	Hawick, Bedrule, Bonchester Bridge, Chesters, Denholm, Newmill-on-Teviot, Roberton, Wilton Dean, Craik, Minto	Scottish Borders
TD9	NEWCASTLETON	Newcastleton, Kershopefoot	Scottish Borders, Cumberland
TD10	DUNS	Greenlaw, Polwarth	Scottish Borders
TD11	DUNS	Duns, Chirnside, Allanton, Cranshaws, Longformacus, Fogo, Gavinton, Swinton, Whitsome, Edrom, Preston, Abbey St Bathans, Grantshouse, Chirnsidebridge	Scottish Borders, East Lothian
TD12	COLDSTREAM	Coldstream, Leitholm, Birgham, Lennel	Scottish Borders
TD12	CORNHILL-ON-TWEED	Cornhill-on-Tweed, Branxton, Crookham, Etal, Carham, Wark on Tweed,	Northumberland
TD12	MINDRUM	Mindrum, Kilham	Northumberland
TD13	COCKBURNSPATH	Cockburnspath, Oldhamstocks, Dunglass, Cove	Scottish Borders, East Lothian
TD14	EYEMOUTH	Eyemouth, Coldingham, St Abbs, Ayton, Burnmouth, Reston, Auchencrow, Houndwood	Scottish Borders
TD15	BERWICK-UPON-TWEED	Foulden, Mordington, Lamberton, Paxton, Fishwick, Ladykirk, Norham, Ford, Cheswick, Holy Island, Hutton, Horncliffe, Duddo, Fenwick, Ancroft, Lowick, Scremerston, Spittal, Holburn	Northumberland, Scottish Borders

== Map ==
TD postcode area map, showing postcode districts in red and post towns in grey text, with links to nearby CA, DG, EH, ML and NE postcode areas.

== See also ==
- Postcode Address File
- List of postcode areas in the United Kingdom
