= Broadmeadows, Scottish Borders =

Village in Scotland, UK

Coordinates: 55.5627°N 2.9348°W

Broadmeadows is a village in the Scottish Borders area of Scotland, on the A708 near Selkirk.

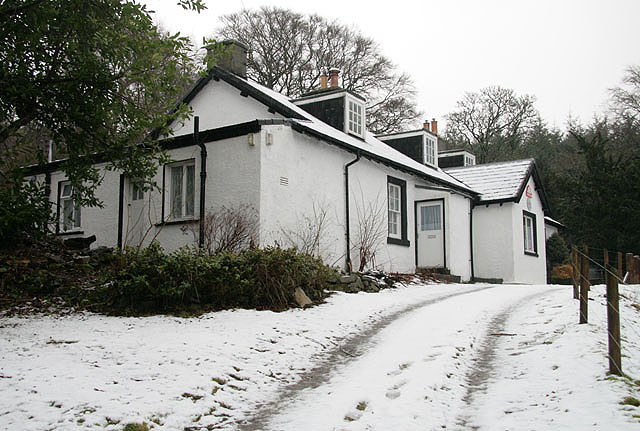
Broadmeadows Youth Hostel, opened 2 May 1931

It is known for having Scotland's first youth hostel, which was converted from a row of four cottages by the late William Stewart Morton, and opened by the Scottish Youth Hostels Association as Broadmeadows Youth Hostel on 2 May 1931. It is located in secluded woodland in the Yarrow Valley.

Broadmeadows Youth Hostel and villagers featured in the short film As Long as You're Young (1962) (12'50" - 13'40"), produced by Glasgow Films Ltd, and catalogued by the National Library of Scotland.

Places nearby include Boleside, Bowhill, Caddonfoot, Ettrickbridge, Lindean, Philiphaugh, Sundhope, Yarrow Water and Yarrowford.

== See also ==
- List of places in the Scottish Borders
- List of places in Scotland
