= Yarrow, Scottish Borders =

Scottish parish in Scottish Borders, Scotland

Coordinates: 55°32′21″N 3°01′09″W

Yarrow
- Location within the Scottish Borders
- OS grid reference: NT357277
- Council area: Scottish Borders
- Country: Scotland
- Sovereign state: United Kingdom
- Post town: Selkirk
- Postcode district: TD7
- Police: Scotland
- Fire: Scottish
- Ambulance: Scottish
- UK Parliament: Berwickshire, Roxburgh and Selkirk
- Scottish Parliament: Ettrick, Roxburgh and Berwickshire

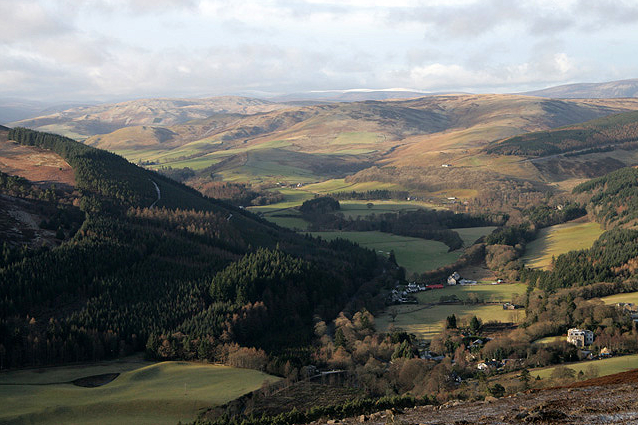
The Yarrow Valley at Yarrowford

Yarrow is a place and parish in the Scottish Borders area of Scotland and in the former county of Selkirkshire.The name "Yarrow" may derive from the Celtic word garw meaning "rough" or possibly share a derivation with the English name "Jarrow".

The parish mainly corresponds with the river valley of Yarrow Water from its source in the west at St. Mary's Loch until its passes into the parish of Selkirk between Yarrowford and Broadmeadows, just upstream from Foulshiels. It has an area of 48,851 acres.

It is bordered on the west and north by the parishes of Tweedsmuir, Peebles, Traquair and Innerleithen in Peeblesshire. On the east by Caddonfoot and Selkirk and on the south by Kirkhope and Ettrick in Selkirkshire.

St Mary's Loch is the principal loch of southern Scotland, being 3½ miles long and in some places thirty fathoms deep.

The parish includes the settlements of Yarrow Feus and Yarrowford, as well as Yarrow itself, which is the site of the Kirk, Manse and former school. The Kirk has a central location in the parish and is about 10 miles distant from the furthermost boundaries.

Yarrow parish now comes within the area of Ettrick and Yarrow Community Council

The ecclesiastical parish (Church of Scotland) is now Ettrick and Yarrow parish, which includes the parishes of Yarrow, Kirkhope and Ettrick, all of whose churches are still used for services

== History of the parish ==
In the foundation charter of Selkirk Abbey, granted by King David in the twelfth century, the native name is translated as Garua in Latin, which in later documents mutated into Zarof, Yharrow and Yara, before assuming its present form of Yarrow.

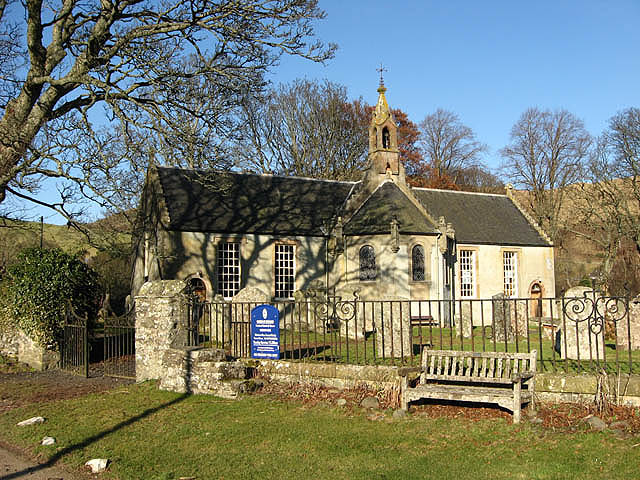
Yarrow Parish Kirk

The old name of the parish was St. Mary's or, in some records, St Mary of the Lowes, from its vicinity to two considerable lochs (Loch of the Lowes and St. Mary's Loch). In the year 1640, the parish church was moved from the vicinity of St. Mary's Loch to the banks of the Yarrow, which henceforth imparted its name to the parish. This site was adjacent to a pre-reformation chapel at Deuchar. However, the glebe remained on the north side of the loch, the same that was attached to St Mary's Chapel, now eight miles to the west of the kirk to which it belonged. The kirk was renovated in 1826, 1876 and 1906. However its interior was destroyed by fire in 1922, but restored following year.

The area of the parish of Yarrow was formerly one of the most extensive in the south of Scotland, encompassing most of the valley of the Yarrow and a considerable part of that of the Ettrick. The shape was very irregular and, although the population was low (1,264 in 1841), it was difficult for the minister of the parish to reach many of them, both as regards distance and the want of roads and bridges.

To ameliorate this problem, the Duke of Buccleuch in 1851 instigated proceedings to have the southern part, in the Ettrick valley, disjoined from the parish and erected into a separate parish. The duke proposed to make over the chapel at Ettrickbridge, which he had built in 1839, to be the church of the new parish, to erect a suitable manse for the minister, and to bear the expense of the judicial separation proceedings. The new parish would extend to 9 miles in length up the river Ettrick, be about 6 miles wide, with an area of about 50 square miles, population 600. The remaining portion of the parish of Yarrow would contain a population of about 670, extending in length to about 19 miles, and in breadth. The new parish was created and named Kirkhope, an old name for the Ettrickbridge area

Thus the population of Yarrow Parish had reduced from 1,270 to 600 by this separation and it would fall further to 500 in 1901 and 402 in 1951.

In 1891 the Boundary Commissioners transferred the Megget district from the Peeblesshire parish of Lyne and Megget to Yarrow (while Yarrow lost some detached and outlying parts to Peeblesshire parishes). The Megget valley lies to the west of St. Mary's Loch and Megget Water feeds into that loch. Much of the valley was flooded by Megget reservoir which was opened in September 1983.

== See also ==
- List of places in the Scottish Borders
- List of places in Scotland
