= Abbotsford Ferry railway station =

Disused railway station in Melrose, Scottish Borders

Coordinates: 55.59133°N 2.79984°W

Abbotsford Ferry
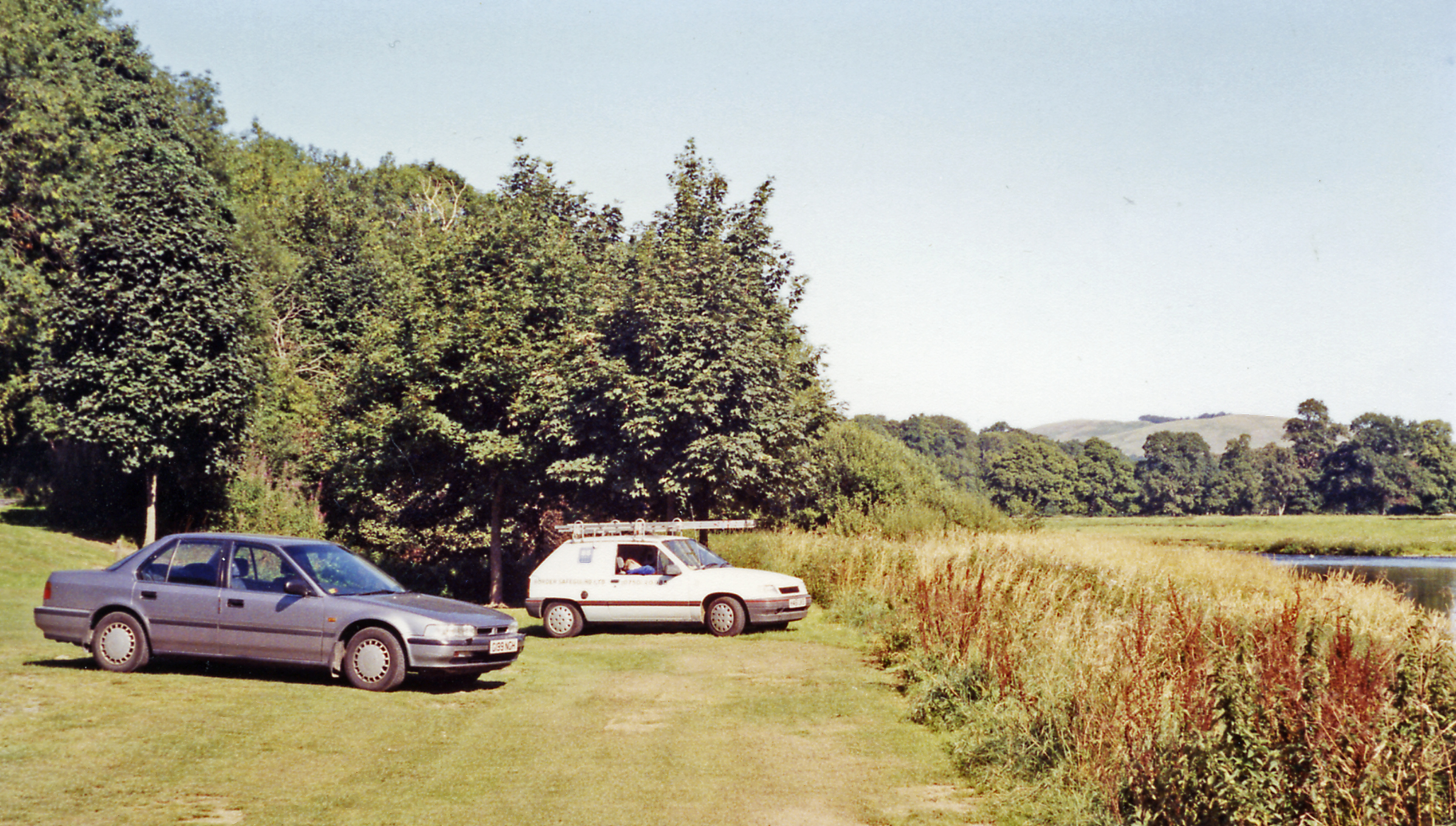
- Location of the former station (1991)

General information
- Location: Melrose, Scottish Borders; Scotland
- Grid reference: NT497334
- Platforms: 1

Other information
- Status: Disused

History
- Opened: 5 April 1856
- Closed: 5 January 1931
- Original company: Selkirk and Galashiels Railway
- Pre-grouping: North British Railway
- Post-grouping: London and North Eastern Railway
Location

Abbotsford Ferry railway station was a small railway station on the branch line from Galashiels to Selkirk railway station at Selkirk in the Scottish county of Selkirkshire.

The station was near Abbotsford House, formerly the residence of historical novelist and poet Sir Walter Scott.

== See also ==
- List of places in the Scottish Borders
- List of places in Scotland

== Sources ==
- Line diagram
- Abbotsford Ferry station on navigable 1946 O. S. map

Preceding station	Disused railways	Following station
Galashiels; Line and station closed	North British Railway; Selkirk and Galashiels Railway	Lindean; Line and station closed
