= Philiphaugh =

Village in Scottish Borders, Scotland

Coordinates: 55.5398°N 2.8857°W

Philiphaugh is a village by the Yarrow Water, on the outskirts of Selkirk, in the Scottish Borders.

Places nearby include Bowhill, Broadmeadows, the Ettrick Water, Ettrickbridge, Lindean, Salenside, Yarrowford and the Yair Forest.

Originally referred to as the land owned as part of Philiphaugh Estate, the name is today more commonly used to describe the most southern parts of Selkirk. Philiphaugh rugby ground is the home of Selkirk Rugby Club. Selkirk Cricket Club is the site of the Battle of Philiphaugh, fought on 13 September 1645 at the height of the Wars of the Three Kingdoms.

The grave of Tibbie Tamson (died 1790), a suicide from Selkirk buried in unconsecrated ground, is located at an isolated spot near Harehead Hill at the boundary between the Philiphaugh and Bowhill estates. The grave is maintained by way of an apology.

== See also ==
- List of places in the Scottish Borders
- List of places in Scotland
- Scottish Border Towns
