= Selkirk and Galashiels Railway =

Scottish railway company

The Selkirk and Galashiels Railway was a railway company that built a branch line connecting Selkirk, Scottish Borders, with the mainline network at Galashiels. The 5-mile (8.0 km) line opened in 1856 and was well used in the period down to 1914. Road transport from about 1923 became a serious competitor and the usage of the line declined steeply. Economy measures did little to retrieve the situation and the passenger service was withdrawn in 1951. Goods traffic continued for a period, but in 1964 that too was withdrawn. There is no railway use of the line now.

== History ==
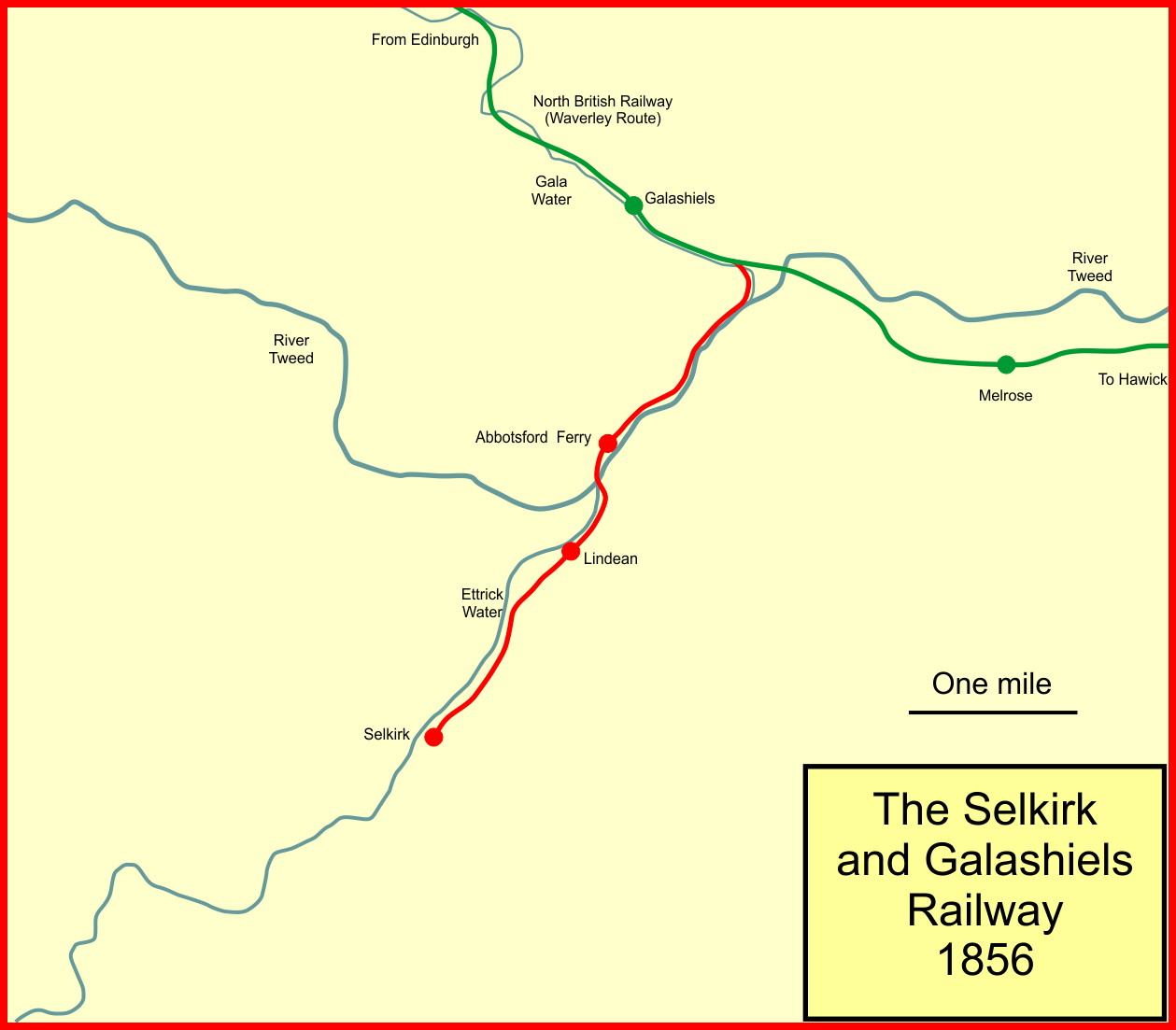
The Selkirk and Galashiels Railway

Over many centuries the towns in the Borders had developed skills in manufacturing high-quality woollen goods, deriving originally from the abundant fellside grassland and equally abundant pure water. The intrinsic disadvantage of their location was the difficulty and expense of transporting the finished products to the market.

The North British Railway obtained authorisation by the North British Railway Act 1844 (7 & 8 Vict. c. lxvi) for its mainline from Edinburgh to Berwick and opened that line in 1846. Already in 1845 with the first line under construction, the North British was planning a long branch line to Hawick, and it obtained an act of Parliament, the Edinburgh and Hawick Railway Act 1845 (8 & 9 Vict. c. clxiii) for the purpose. The NBR's purpose was to secure as much territory for itself as possible, and to connect beyond to Carlisle, giving access to the emerging West Coast route from London as well as the East Coast. At first, this strategic objective was not advertised, and in any case Hawick as a major wool making town was a valid destination. On 9 February 1846 the North British Railway held a shareholders' meeting at which approval was given for the NBR to construct a branch line to Selkirk, but this was never carried into effect; by October 1847 shareholder discomfort with the extent of financial commitments being taken on, had reached an unbearable level.

The Hawick line and its extension to Carlisle became the Waverley Route, and its completion encouraged ideas of connecting other Borders towns by branch lines or otherwise. Hawick was reached on 1 November 1849, and the line passed through Galashiels.

Selkirk and Galashiels Railway Act 1854
- Act of Parliament
- Parliament of the United Kingdom
- Long title: An Act for making a Railway from the Town and Royal Burgh of Selkirk to the Hawick Branch of the North British Railway, about a Mile Southwards from the Galashiels Station of the said Branch; and for other Purposes.
- Citation: 17 & 18 Vict. c. cxcix

Dates
- Royal assent: 31 July 1854

Other legislation
- Repealed by: North British and Selkirk Railways Amalgamation Act 1859

Status: Repealed

Text of statute as originally enacted

Selkirk lay about 5 miles (8.0 km) from Galashiels, and as well as woollen goods it had an important shoemaking industry. The independent Selkirk and Galashiels Railway was incorporated by the Selkirk and Galashiels Railway Act 1854 (17 & 18 Vict. c. cxcix) on 31 July 1854, with authorised capital of £24,000. The promoters secured agreement with the North British Railway that the NBR would work the line; the terms were for 50% of receipts up to £3,000 a year and 45% above that.

The said Railway shall commence at a Point in the Mill Haugh or Town Haugh of Selkirk near to the Corn Mills of Selkirk and near to the Town and Royal Burgh of Selkirk in the Parish and County of Selkirk, and terminate by a Junction with the Hawick Branch of the North British Railway at a Point thereon between the Galashiels Station of the said Branch of said Railway and the Bridge on the said Hawick Branch over the River Tweed, and about a Mile Southwards from the said Station of the said Branch in the Parish of Melrose and County of Roxburgh, and which Railway will pass from, through, or into the following Parishes, Burgh, and Places, or some of them; that is to say, the Parish of Selkirk in the Counties of Selkirk and Roxburgh, the Royal Burgh of Selkirk in the said County of Selkirk, the Parish of Galashiels, comprehending therein the ancient Parish of Lindean in the Counties of Selkirk and Roæburgh, and the Parish of Melrose in the said County of Roxburgh. — Section 22, Selkirk and Galashiels Railway Act 1854 (17 & 18 Vict. c. cxcix)

Subscriptions for shares had to be secured, and work on building the line did not start until the following year. Captain Tyler, Inspecting Officer of the Board of Trade, visited the line on 3 April 1856. He approved the line for passenger operation, but he was critical of the poor quality of the line: he reported that, "The permanent way is of a light description and the joints of the rails are not fished. The gradients are severe and the curves sharp, and altogether the line is not fitted for heavy traffic or for high speeds." Moreover, the junction on the main line near Galashiels was protected by distant signals only, and they were too close to the junction, giving inadequate stopping distance for approaching trains: there were no stop signals at all. The company agreed to make urgent changes and Tyler agreed to the line opening on the proviso of one engine in steam operation, and the use of tank engines only, as there was no turntable at the terminus.

A local newspaper had a more benevolent view of the inspection:

Selkirk Railway: The Government inspector went over the line on Thursday [3 April 1856], examining it carefully. He has expressed his entire satisfaction with the works and given a most favourable report. The line will be open to passengers on Saturday first. It is a single line of rails, and its route passes along the banks of the Gala, the Tweed, and the Ettrick, generally skirting the sides of those beautiful haughs which lie in its path. The length of the line is 6 1/4 miles (10.1 km).

The line duly opened on 5 April 1856; it had stations at Abbotsford Ferry, Lindean and Selkirk. The normal train service was four trains a day, six days a week, and the line was worked by the North British Railway.

Abbotsford Ferry station was at a location called Boldside (actually a country house of that name) and the station may have been known as Boldside at first. The ferry was a rowing boat, which the company hoped would encourage visitors use the station to come to Abbotsford House, the former home of Walter Scott. An advertisement in 1871 announced a public roup at Fairnalee, which was "about 3 miles [4.8 km] from the Boldside station of the Edinburgh and Hawick Railway", but this may reflect the advertiser's colloquial usage rather than any official name.

Three months after the line opened, the running of trains on Sundays was proposed. This produced a storm of protest:

The directors of the Selkirk and Galashiels Railway having at their last meeting passed a resolution to open the line [on Sundays] for the conveyance of mail bags and passengers, a large and enthusiastic meeting was held on the evening of Tuesday [24 June 1856]... for the purpose of entering their protest at the proposed violation of the Sabbath.

However the NBR, the driving force in the matter, persisted and the Sunday trains ran.

North British and Selkirk Railways Amalgamation Act 1859
- Act of Parliament
- Parliament of the United Kingdom
- Long title: An Act to amalgamate the Selkirk and Galashiels Railway Company with the North British Railway Company, and for other Purposes.
- Citation: 22 & 23 Vict. c. xiv

Dates
- Royal assent: 21 July 1859

The North British Railway absorbed the Selkirk and Galashiels Railway Company on 21 July 1859 by the North British and Selkirk Railways Amalgamation Act 1859 (22 & 23 Vict. c. xiv). (Note: Awdry, and also Thomas, say 21 July 1859. According to Nisbet, the date was 1 July. Carter says "by Act of 12 July 1859." The discrepancy may be explained by an authorising act of Parliament and the practical adoption date being separated by a few weeks.)

The light construction of the line had not been confined to the permanent way, and in 1868 the North British Railway found that it needed to reconstruct the timber bridge over the River Tweed with iron girders on stone piers, at a cost of over £6,000.

The number of passenger trains on the branch was increased to six by 1863 and to 13 by 1887. The Sunday trains were withdrawn in 1916 due to manpower shortages in World War I, and they were never reinstated.

From 1923 the North British Railway formed a constituent of the new London and North Eastern Railway (LNER) following the Railways Act 1921, and the Selkitk and Galashiels company, only in existence to receive the NBR's rental charge, was absorbed into the LNER. In this period motor bus services began to erode passenger carryings on the line. Closure of the railway passenger service was contemplated by the LNER in 1930, but was not proceeded with, but Abbotsford Ferry station was closed from 5 January 1931. Seeking economy of working, the LNER introduced a Sentinel steam railcar on the branch from 5 January 1931; the vehicle operated all normal passenger trains. The railcar named Protector was in use from February 1931, and from December 1933 Nettle took over, continuing until August 1945 when the Sentinel railcars were taken out of service, and steam trains took over once again.

Goods traffic too was in decline from about 1924 due to the competition from motor lorries.

British Railways, Scottish Region, took over the railways in the area at the beginning of 1948, on the nationalisation of the railways. At this time the passenger traffic was in serious decline, with only about 14 tickets being issued daily on the branch. In May 1951, British Railways proposed closure of the passenger service on the line, and with no objection being put forward, it was decided to close the passenger service on 10 September 1951. Some works outing special trains ran from Selkirk after closure until at least 1957.

The station remained open for goods traffic, but that too was in decline; a review in November 1958 considered withdrawal, but for the time being the line continued in use, but on 2 November 1964 all public goods facilities were withdrawn; a private siding at Selkirk remained in use for a short time after that date. A short section of the branch at Galashiels was retained to cross the Gala Water to serve the gas works, but that too closed in October 1966, and the line was completely closed.

== Topography ==
The line left the Galashiels to Hawick line, turning south immediately before the Tweed Bridge, crossing the Gala Water, and following the west bank of the river Tweed, past Abbotsford Ferry station. The line continued south, crossing the Tweed to the east bank immediately north of the confluence of the Ettrick Water, and followed close to the east bank of that river to Lindean station, at Ettrick Bridge. Continuing still not far from the Ettrick, the line ran to the terminus station at Selkirk.

The length of the line was 5 1/4 miles (8.4 km) from Selkirk station to the junction with the main line (Selkirk Junction). The figure of 6 1/4 miles (10.1 km) often quoted is from Selkirk station to Galashiels station, that is, partly on the main line. In 1960 the distance from Selkirk station to Galashiels station signalbox was quoted as 6 miles 248 yards (9.883 km).

Location list:

- Selkirk Junction; diverged from the Hawick main line;
- Abbotsford Ferry; opened 5 April 1856; closed 5 January 1931;
- Lindean; opened 5 April 1856; closed 10 September 1951;
- Selkirk opened 5 April 1856; closed 10 September 1951.
