= Ettrick, Scotland =

Coordinates: 55.4188°N 3.1708°W

Ettrick: Scottish Gaelic: Eadaraig
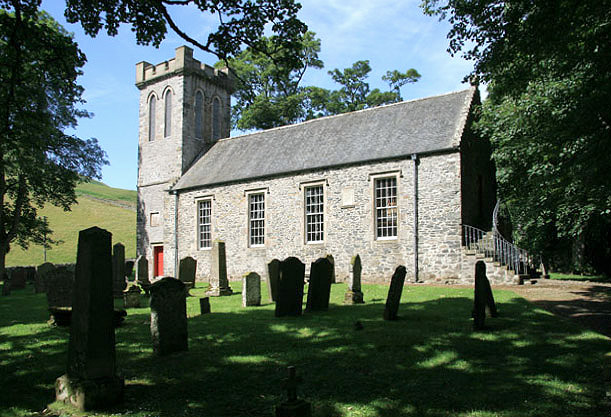
- Ettrick Parish Church

- Location within the Scottish Borders
- Population: 105 (2001)
- OS grid reference: NT471288
- Civil parish: Ettrick
- Council area: Scottish Borders
- Lieutenancy area: Roxburgh, Ettrick and Lauderdale
- Country: Scotland
- Sovereign state: United Kingdom
- Post town: Selkirk
- Postcode district: TD7
- Police: Scotland
- Fire: Scottish
- Ambulance: Scottish
- UK Parliament: Berwickshire, Roxburgh and Selkirk
- Scottish Parliament: Ettrick, Roxburgh and Berwickshire

Ettrick (Scottish Gaelic: Eadaraig, IPA: [ˈet̪əɾɪkʲ]) is a small village and civil parish in the Scottish Borders area of Scotland. It is located on the B709, around 17 miles (28 km) south-west of the town of Selkirk.

== Local area ==
Ettrick Water is the river which flows through the Ettrick Valley, and across its flood plain, the Ettrick Marshes, within Selkirkshire. It is the second fastest rising river in Scotland, and it runs through the village of Ettrickbridge some dozen miles downstream, and the old town of Selkirk.

Ettrick Forest was a large Royal forest that is much depleted due to sheep farming and industrial forestry, though at some places by the banks of the Water, and in the ravines of its tributaries, places difficult for sheep and of small interest to loggers, the remnants of the fauna which composed the ancient forest can still be seen and enjoyed.

Traditionally, hill farming of sheep and cattle farming have been important. In recent years, tourism has become increasingly important.

== Literary connections ==
The area around Ettrick has several literary connections. The poet and author James Hogg (1770–1835), known as the "Ettrick Shepherd", was born at a farm within Ettrick parish, near Ettrick Hall, and is buried in Ettrick Kirkyard. "Laverlaw", the fictional estate of Sandy Arbuthnot, Lord Clanroyden, in the works of John Buchan, is set near Ettrick. Robert Louis Stevenson's hero David Balfour in Kidnapped hails from the fictitious village of "Essendean" in Ettrick Forest. It is also mentioned in the traditional Scottish folksong, "Ettrick Lady", recorded by The Corries. Most recently, the Ettrick valley was used as the setting for the story "No Advantages", from Alice Munro's 2006 short story collection, The View from Castle Rock.

Ettrick was also home to one of Scotland's most enduring theologians, Rev Thomas Boston (1676–1732), Ettrick's minister from 1707. His seminal work, Human Nature in its Fourfold State, was widely read throughout Scotland by people of all classes and is still in print today.

Tibbie Shiel, the topic of much literature, was born here and is buried here.
