= Caddonlee =

Coordinates: 55.60°N 02.89°W

- Location within the Scottish Borders
- OS grid reference: NT4435
- Council area: Scottish Borders
- Country: Scotland
- Sovereign state: United Kingdom
- Police: Scotland
- Fire: Scottish
- Ambulance: Scottish
- UK Parliament: Berwickshire, Roxburgh and Selkirk
- Scottish Parliament: Midlothian South, Tweeddale and Lauderdale

Caddonlee is a farm in the village of Clovenfords in the Scottish Borders area of Scotland, by the Caddon Water, near Caddonfoot where Caddon Water meets the Tweed . The nearest town is Galashiels. On the farm are traces of an auxiliary Roman fort allied to that main Roman outpost at Trimontium at Melrose

== See also ==
- List of places in the Scottish Borders
- List of places in Scotland
