= List of listed buildings in Yarrow, Scottish Borders =

This is a list of listed buildings in the parish of Yarrow in the Scottish Borders, Scotland.

== List ==
Name	Location	Date Listed	Grid Ref. (Note: Sometimes known as OSGB36, the grid reference (where provided) is based on the British national grid reference system used by the Ordnance Survey. • "Guide to National Grid". Ordnance Survey. • "Get-a-map". Ordnance Survey.)	Geo-coordinates	Notes	LB Number (Note: Historic Environment Scotland assign a unique alphanumeric identifier to each designated site in Scotland, for listed buildings this always begins with "LB", for example "LB12345".)	Image
Hangingshaw House With Terrace Walls And Summer Pavilion				55°33′41″N 2°57′20″W	Category B	18966	Upload Photo
Hangingshaw, East Lodge				55°33′36″N 2°56′29″W	Category C(S)	18967	Upload Photo
Graveyard, Yarrow Kirk				55°32′21″N 3°01′10″W	Category B	17129	Upload Photo
Sundhope Including Ancillary Building, Walled Garden And Boundary Walls				55°30′58″N 3°03′10″W	Category C(S)	19669	Upload Photo
St Mary's Chapel And Graveyard				55°30′04″N 3°10′57″W	Category B	17147	Upload Photo
Cappercleuch, Aa Sentry Box (No 723)				55°29′45″N 3°12′14″W	Category B	49228	Upload Photo
Hangingshaw, South Lodge				55°33′25″N 2°57′15″W	Category C(S)	18968	Upload Photo
Yarrow Bridge				55°32′18″N 3°01′09″W	Category C(S)	13904	Upload Photo
Bridge Leading To Tibbie Shiels Inn				55°28′20″N 3°12′20″W	Category C(S)	13908	Upload Photo
Bridge Near Gordon Arms Inn				55°30′43″N 3°05′48″W	Category C(S)	13902	Upload Photo
Gordon Arms Inn Including Boundary Walls And Gates				55°30′47″N 3°05′51″W	Category C(S)	13910	Upload Photo
Yarrow Parish Church Yarrow Kirk				55°32′22″N 3°01′10″W	Category B	17128	Upload Photo
Dryhope Tower		12.03.1971-28.10.2015 (now scheduled monument)		55°30′39″N 3°09′42″W	Category B	17146	Upload another image See more images

== Key ==
The scheme for classifying buildings in Scotland is:

- Category A: "buildings of national or international importance, either architectural or historic; or fine, little-altered examples of some particular period, style or building type."
- Category B: "buildings of regional or more than local importance; or major examples of some particular period, style or building type, which may have been altered."
- Category C: "buildings of local importance; lesser examples of any period, style, or building type, as originally constructed or moderately altered; and simple traditional buildings which group well with other listed buildings."

In March 2016 there were 47,288 listed buildings in Scotland. Of these, 8% were Category A, and 50% were Category B, with the remaining 42% being Category C.
