= Lindean railway station =

Disused railway station in Lindean, Scottish Borders

Lindean

General information
- Location: Lindean, Scottish Borders; Scotland
- Coordinates: 55.5732°N 2.8178°W
- Grid reference: NT485314
- Platforms: 1

Other information
- Status: Disused

History
- Original company: Selkirk and Galashiels Railway
- Pre-grouping: North British Railway
- Post-grouping: London and North Eastern Railway

Key dates
- 5 April 1856: Opened
- 10 September 1951: Closed to passengers
- 23 May 1964: Closed to goods
Location

Lindean railway station served the village of Lindean, Scottish Borders, Scotland, from 1856 to 1964 on the Selkirk and Galashiels Railway.

== History ==
The station was opened on 5 April 1856 by the Selkirk and Galashiels Railway. To the west was Lindean Mill and to the east were two sidings. The level crossing was controlled by a ground frame. A few yards away from the platform was the stationmaster's house and behind the platform was a railway cottage. The station closed to passengers on 10 September 1951 but remained open for goods traffic. It was downgraded to an unstaffed public delivery siding on 13 September 1954. The platform was reduced to a mound and was demolished in 1961. The station closed to goods on 23 May 1964.

Preceding station	Disused railways	Following station
Abbotsford Ferry; Line and station closed	Selkirk and Galashiels Railway	Selkirk; Line and station closed
