= Caddonfoot =

Village in Scottish Borders, Scotland

Coordinates: 55.6053°N 2.8768°W

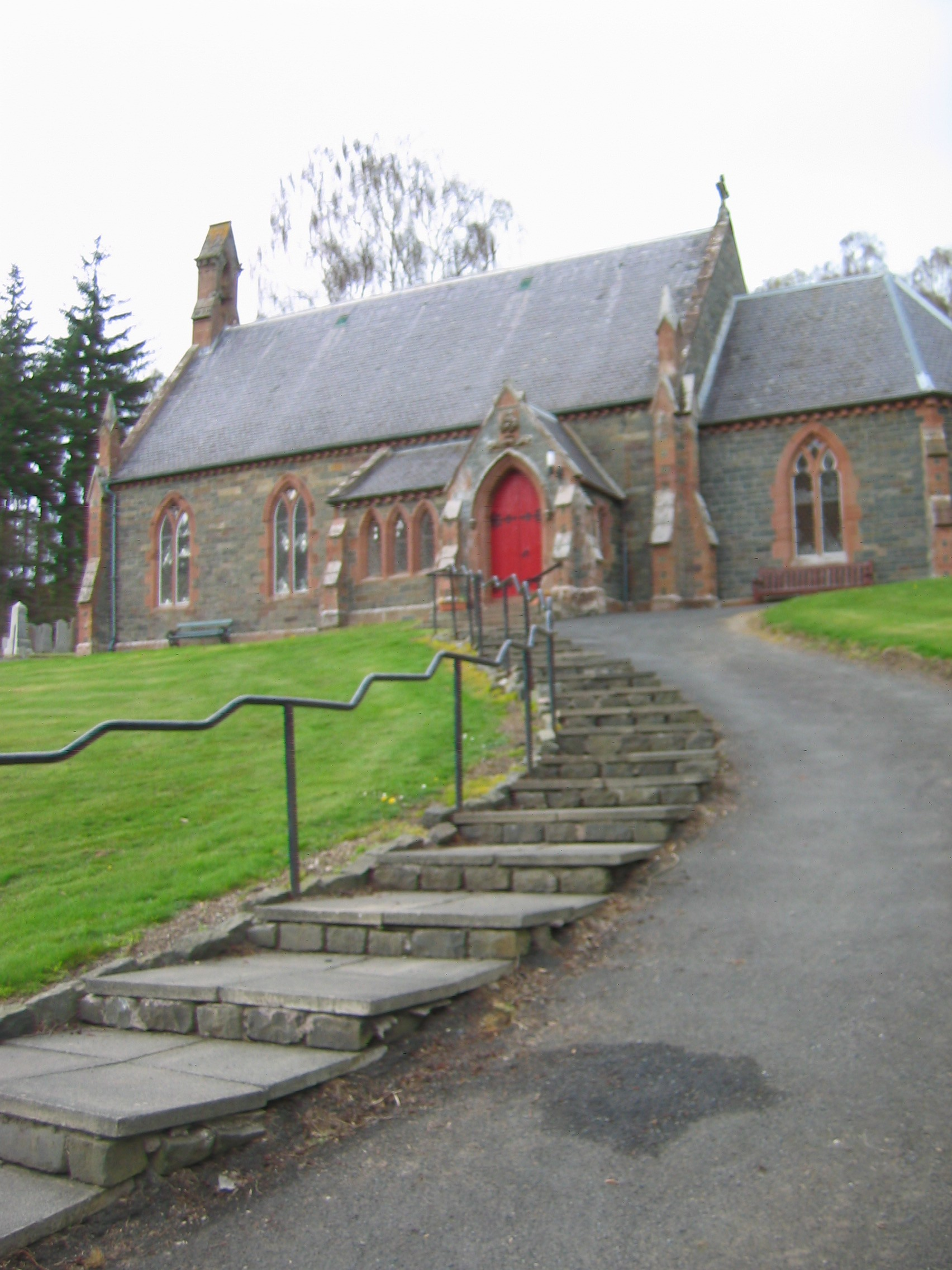
Caddonfoot Kirk

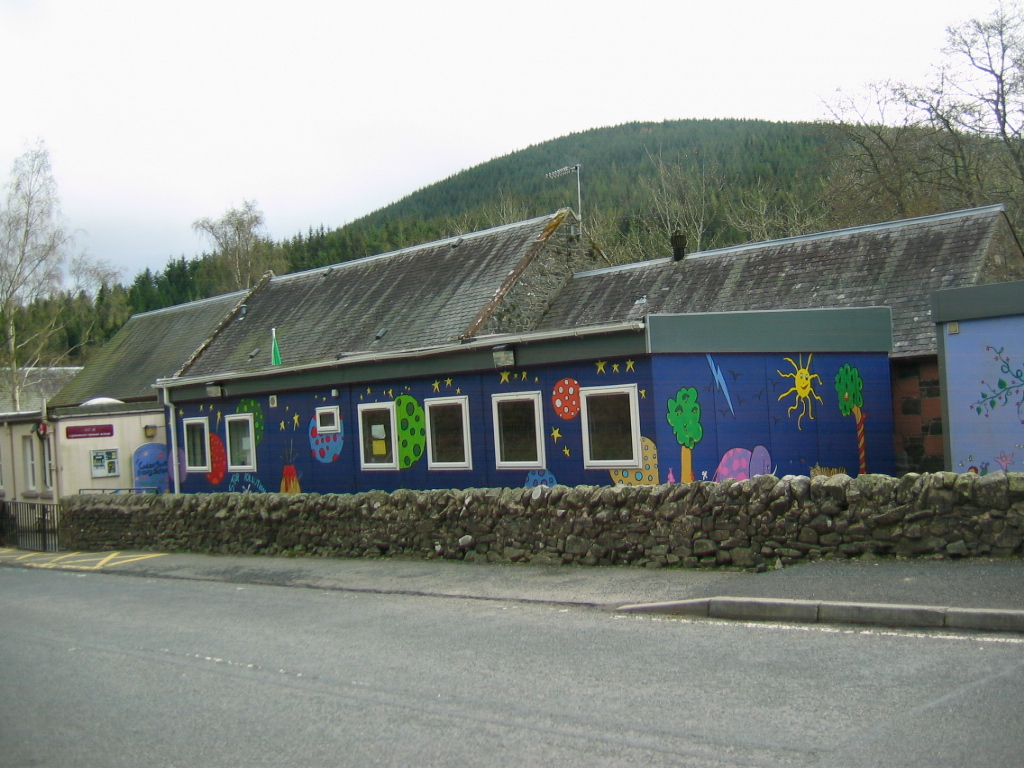
Caddonfoot Primary School

Caddonfoot (Scottish Gaelic: Bun Chadain) is a village on the River Tweed, in the Scottish Borders area of Scotland, on the A707, near Galashiels.

The village is at the mouth of the Caddon Water

Other places nearby include Boleside, Broadmeadows, Scottish Borders, Buckholm, Clovenfords, Darnick, Gattonside, Innerleithen, Lindean, Melrose, Selkirk, Stow, Traquair, Tweedbank, Yarrow.

The church was erected in 1861 and became the parochial church of the new parish of Caddonfoot in 1870. The church was enlarged in 1875 and in the same year that the village school was rebuilt. The school closed in 2012 as a new building was opened in Clovenfords.

Prior to 1898 Caddonfoot lay within the civil parish of Stow, on its border with Galashiels. Stow parish was mainly in Midlothian (Edinburghshire) but the southern portion, mainly the valley of Caddon Water was in Selkirkshire. Then in December 1898 a new civil parish of Caddonfoot was erected consisting of the portion of the civil parish of Stow within Selkirkshire, and the portions of the civil parishes of Selkirk, Galashiels, and Yarrow, situated within the ecclesiastical parish of Caddonfoot. The civil parish includes Clovenfords and Caddonlee and the Clovenfords and District Community Council serves roughly the same area.

Caddonfoot War Memorial stands in the parish churchyard, and was designed by Sir Robert Lorimer.

The civil parish has an area of 19,252 acres and a population of 912 (in 2011).
