= Newmill-on-Teviot =

Coordinates: 55.387092°N 2.862278°W

Newmill: Scots: Newmill
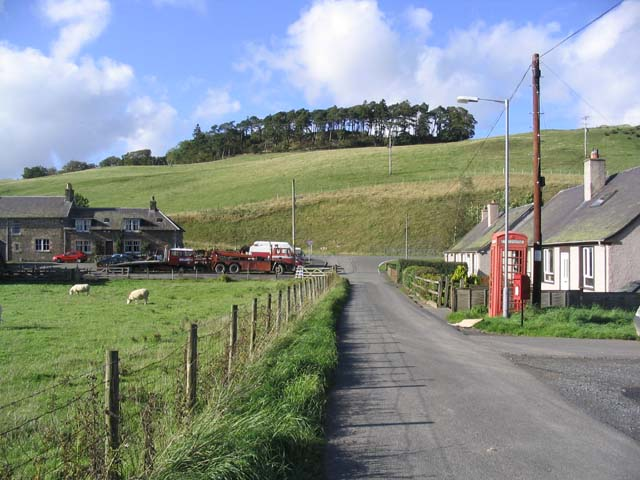
- Newmill

- Location within the Scottish Borders
- Population: 50 (2001 census)
- Language: English; Southern Scots
- OS grid reference: NT454106
  - Edinburgh: 57 mi (92 km)
  - London: 345 mi (555 km)
- Community council: Upper Teviotdale and Borthwick Water
- Council area: Scottish Borders
- Lieutenancy area: Roxburgh, Ettrick and Lauderdale
- Country: Scotland
- Sovereign state: United Kingdom
- Post town: HAWICK
- Postcode district: TD9
- Dialling code: 01450
- Police: Scotland
- Fire: Scottish
- Ambulance: Scottish
- UK Parliament: Berwickshire, Roxburgh and Selkirk
- Scottish Parliament: Ettrick, Roxburgh and Berwickshire

Newmill-on-Teviot, commonly called Newmill, is a hamlet in the Scottish Borders, 7 kilometres (4.3 mi) south of Hawick on the River Teviot.

The remains of Allanmouth Tower, a 16th-century tower house, lie to the south-east of the settlement.
