= Redpath, Scottish Borders =

Coordinates: 55.614°N 2.661°W

Redpath: Scots: Rippath
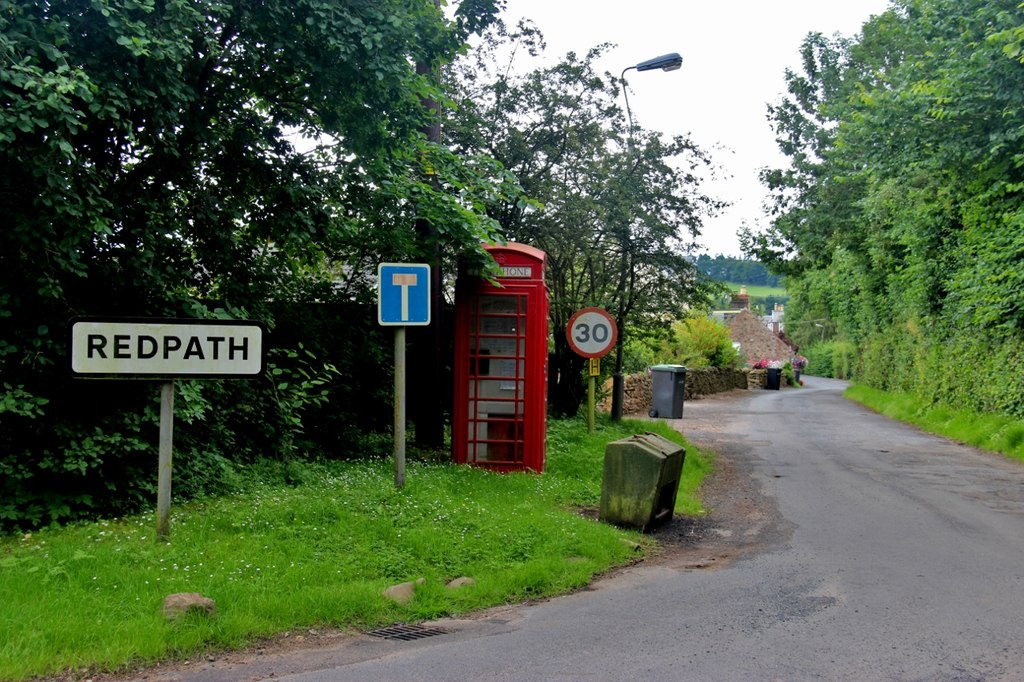
- Village entrance

- Location within the Scottish Borders
- Population: 56 (2001)
- OS grid reference: NT583357
  - Edinburgh: 31 mi (50 km) NW
- Civil parish: Earlston
- Community council: Earlston
- Council area: Scottish Borders
- Lieutenancy area: Roxburgh, Ettrick and Lauderdale
- Country: Scotland
- Sovereign state: United Kingdom
- Post town: EARLSTON
- Postcode district: TD4
- Dialling code: 01896
- Police: Scotland
- Fire: Scottish
- Ambulance: Scottish
- UK Parliament: Berwickshire, Roxburgh and Selkirk
- Scottish Parliament: Midlothian South, Tweeddale and Lauderdale

Redpath (Scots: Rippath) is a small village located between the larger settlements of Earlston, 2 miles (3.2 km) to the north, and St Boswells, 3 miles (4.8 km) to the south, in the historic county of Berwickshire within the Scottish Borders. The Leader Water runs past the west end of the village.

== Gallery ==
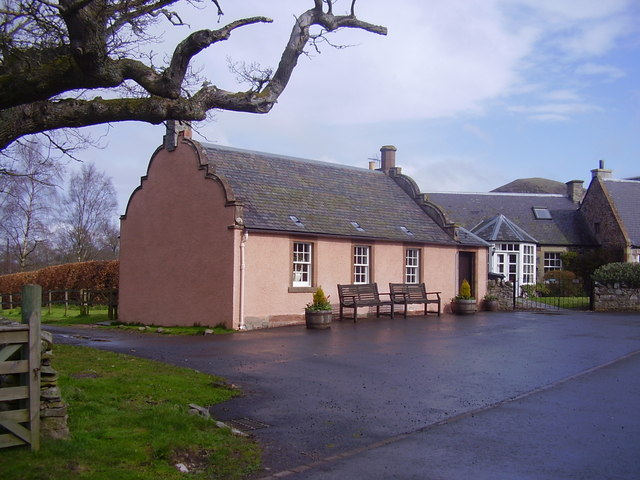
Redpath Village Hall

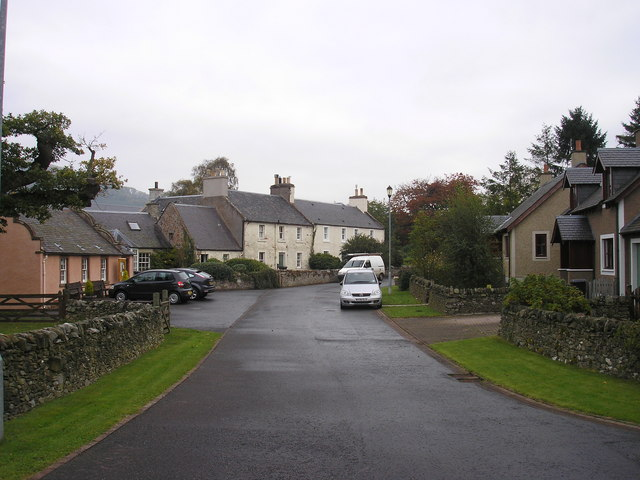
Redpath Village

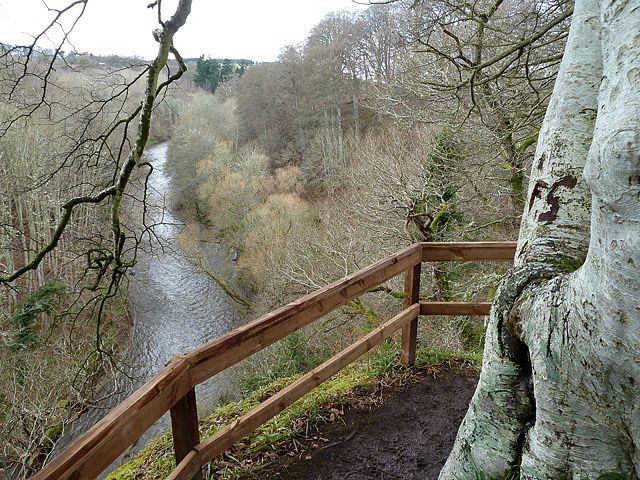
Leader Water outside Redpath

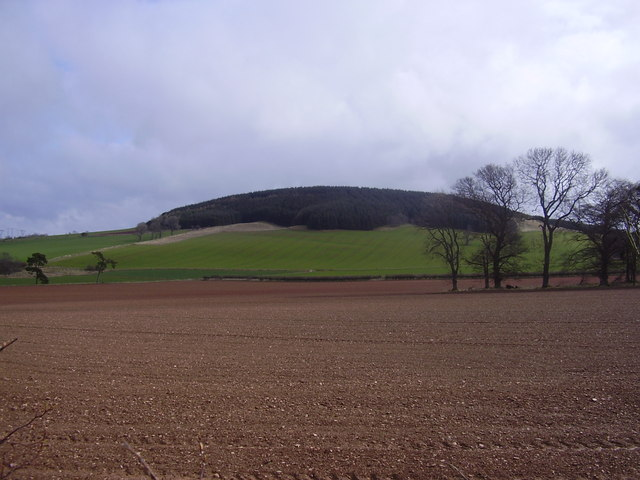
Redpath Hill

== See also ==
- List of places in the Scottish Borders
- List of places in Scotland
