= Yarrowford =

Village in Scottish Borders, Scotland

Coordinates: 55.5597°N 2.9403°W

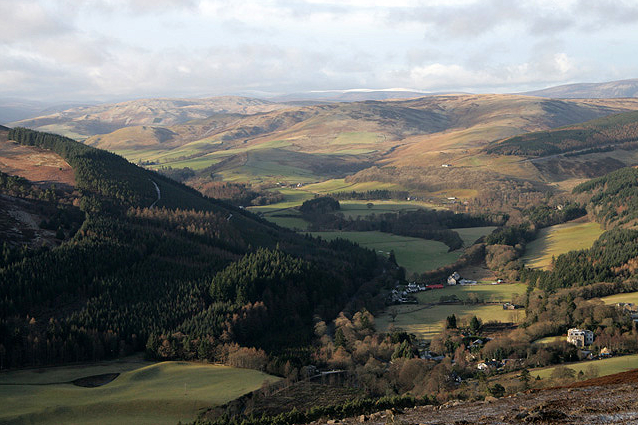
Yarrowford

Yarrowford is a village on the A708, in the Scottish Borders area of Scotland, 4 miles north-west of Selkirk, in the Ettrick Forest.

The Yarrow Water flows through the village and joins the Ettrick Water near Philiphaugh.

Places nearby include Bowhill, Ettrickbridge, Newark Castle, the Yair Forest, Yarrow, Scottish Borders and Yarrow Feus.

== See also ==
- List of places in the Scottish Borders
- List of places in Scotland
