= Boleside =

Village in the Scottish Borders, Scotland

Coordinates: 55.58°N 02.81°W

- Location within the Scottish Borders
- OS grid reference: NT4933
- Council area: Scottish Borders
- Country: Scotland
- Sovereign state: United Kingdom
- Police: Scotland
- Fire: Scottish
- Ambulance: Scottish
- UK Parliament: Berwickshire, Roxburgh and Selkirk
- Scottish Parliament: Midlothian South, Tweeddale and Lauderdale

Boleside is a village in the Scottish Borders area of Scotland, on the B7060, south of Galashiels. It is very close to the place where the Ettrick Water joins the River Tweed.

Other places nearby include Abbotsford, Clovenfords, Lindean, Melrose, Midlem, Selkirk, Yair and Yarrowford.

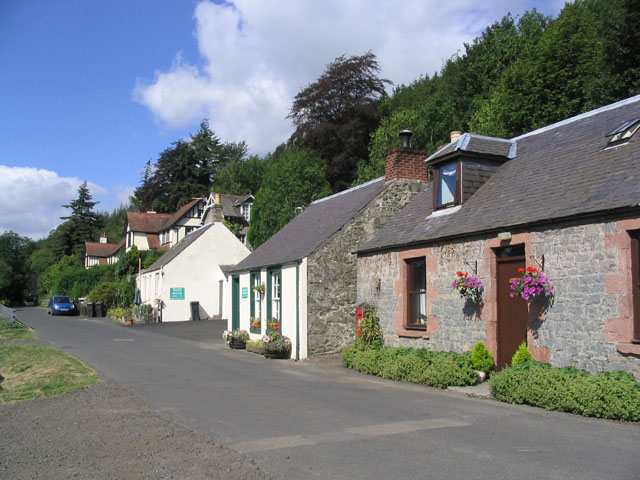
Houses at Boleside

== See also ==
- List of places in the Scottish Borders
- List of places in Scotland
