= Clearburn Loch =

Loch in Scotland

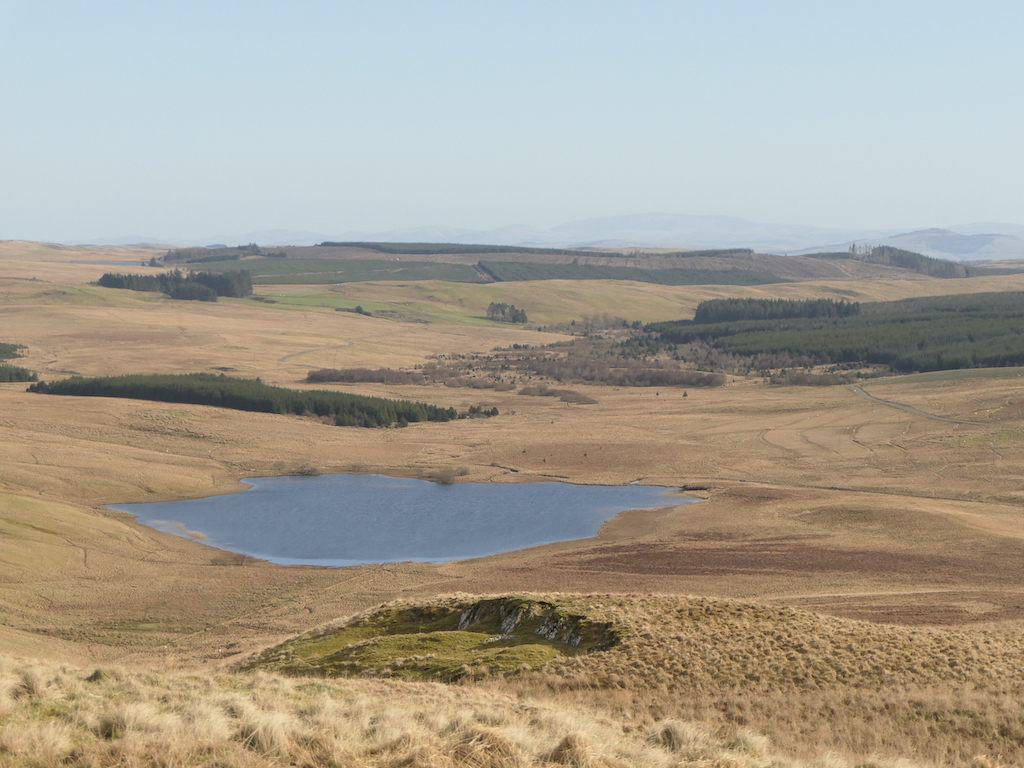
- Clearburn Loch and surrounding moorland, from the west

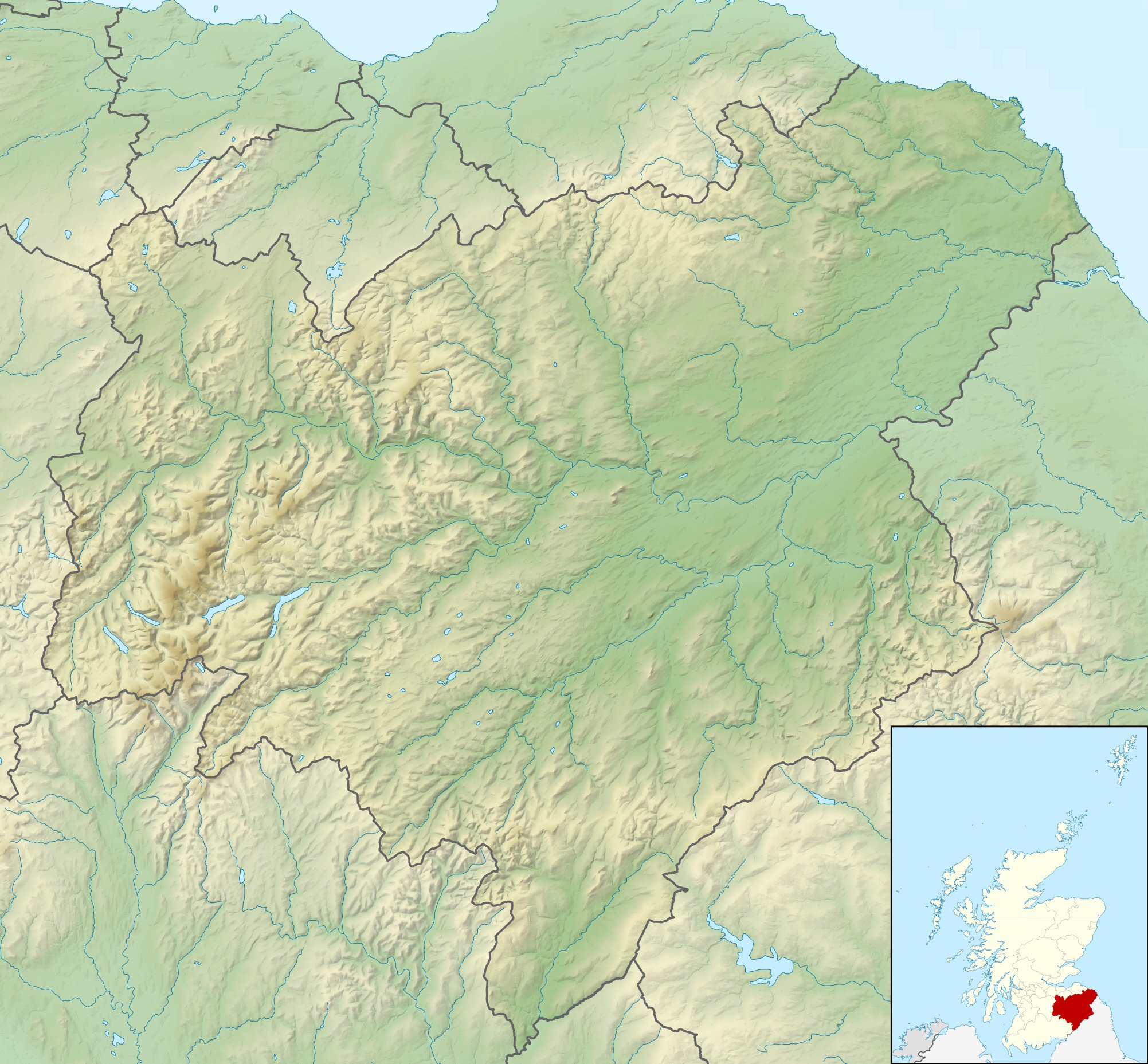
- Location within Scottish Borders
- Location: Scottish Borders
- Coordinates: 55°25′44.7″N 3°02′33.9″W
- Primary inflows: Thorniecleuch Burn, Weavers Sike
- Primary outflows: Clear Burn
- Basin countries: Scotland, United Kingdom
- Max. length: 422 m (1,385 ft)
- Max. width: 242 m (794 ft)
- Surface elevation: 311 m (1,020 ft)

Clearburn Loch is a lochan (small loch) situated just north of the B711, 1.59km northeast of the hamlet of Buccleuch in the Scottish Borders.

The lochan gives its name to a nearby cottage, as well as its primary outflow, the Clear Burn, which leads to the Ettrick Water via the Rankle Burn.

Clearburn Loch is mentioned as a popular angling spot in an 1854 handbook, especially for brown trout.
