= Akermoor Loch =

Loch in the Scottish Borders, Scotland

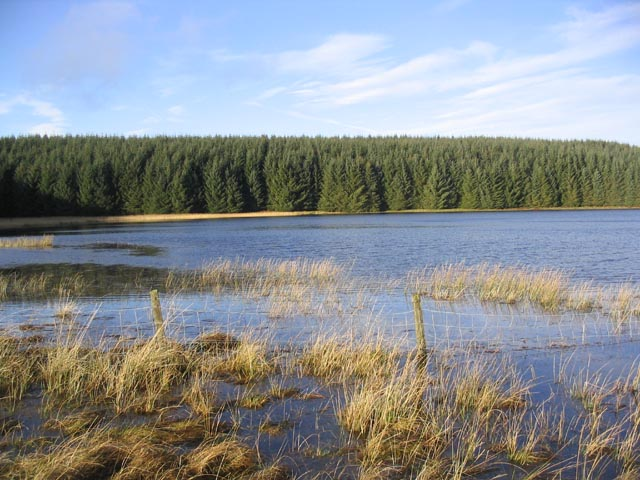
- Loch Akermoor, from its southwest shore

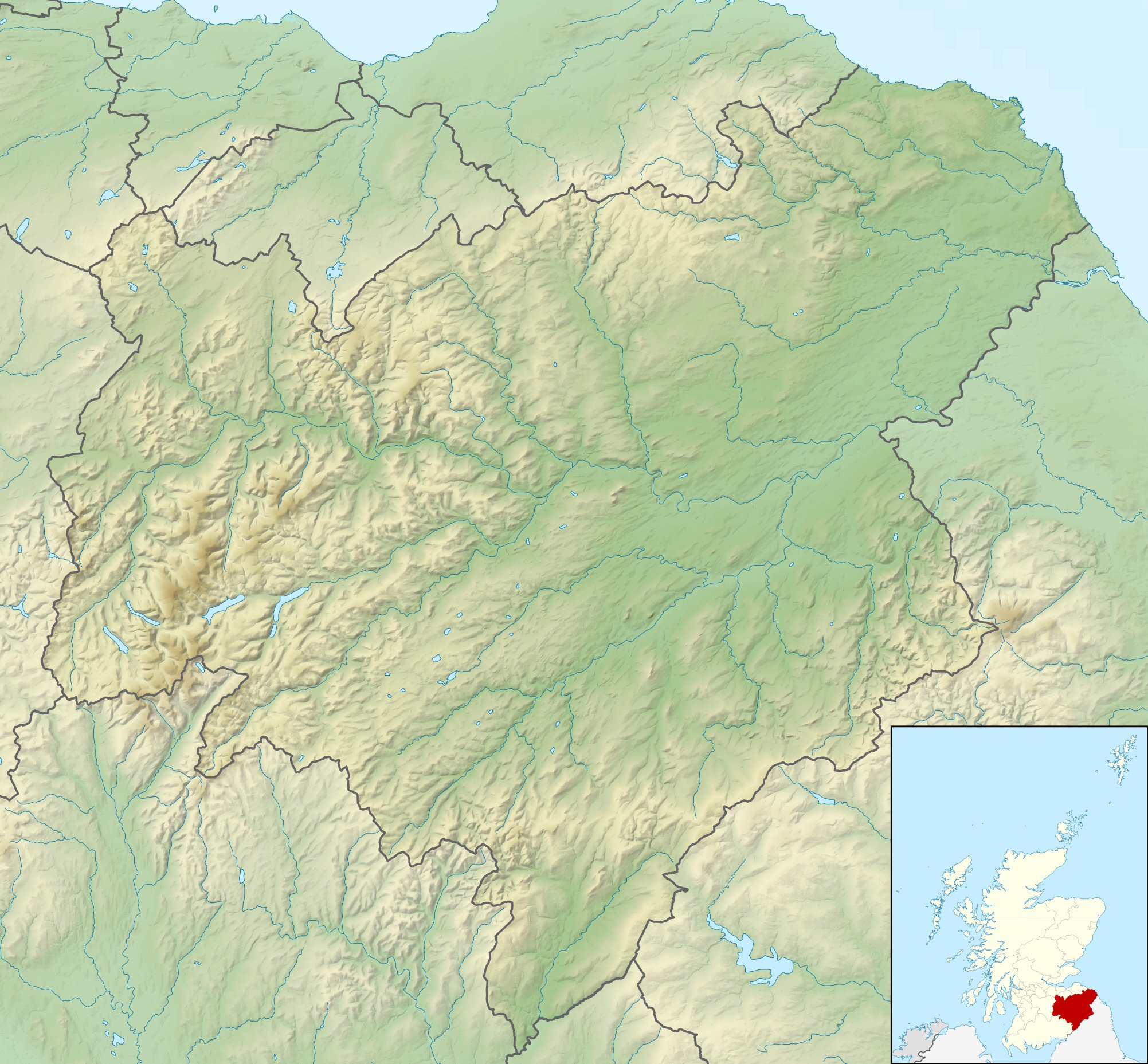
- Location within Scottish Borders
- Location: Southern Uplands
- Coordinates: 55°28′45.7″N 2°56′23.9″W
- Primary outflows: Blindhaugh Burn
- Basin countries: Scotland, United Kingdom
- Max. length: 520 m (1,710 ft)
- Max. width: 253 m (830 ft)
- Surface elevation: 345.2 m (1,133 ft)

Akermoor Loch is a remote upland lochan (small loch) in Selkirkshire, Scotland, approximately 6.5 kilometres (4.0 mi) west of the village of Ashkirk.

The loch has a large timber plantation on its northwest shore. Langhope Rig Wind Farm, constructed between 2008 and 2017, sits to its south.

Akermoor Loch has been a Site of Special Scientific Interest since 1971 due to its mesotrophic waters, which have produced "an abundance of organisms adapted to naturally high nutrient status". The loch supports flora not commonly found in the Scottish Borders, including several species of pondweed, moss, and wild grasses.

The loch has a stock of brown trout and is a common site for angling. An old access track leads to the loch's northeast end.

Akermoor Loch sits in a bed of greywacke, as part of the Hawick Group. In the 18th century, marl was extracted from the loch for agricultural purposes.
