= Selkirk railway station =

Disused railway station in Selkirk, Scottish Borders

Selkirk

General information
- Location: Selkirk, Scottish Borders; Scotland
- Coordinates: 55.5502°N 2.8471°W
- Grid reference: NT466288
- Platforms: 1

Other information
- Status: Disused

History
- Original company: Selkirk and Galashiels Railway
- Pre-grouping: North British Railway
- Post-grouping: London and North Eastern Railway; British Railways (Scottish Region)

Key dates
- 5 April 1856: Opened
- 10 September 1951: Closed to passengers
- 2 November 1964: Closed to goods
Location

Selkirk railway station served the town of Selkirk, Scottish Borders, Scotland, from 1856 to 1964 on the Selkirk and Galashiels Railway.

== History ==
The station was opened on 5 April 1856 by the Selkirk and Galashiels Railway. It was situated at the end of Station Road. On the west side was the goods yard which had six sidings and a goods shed. To the north was an engine shed and on the north side was the signal box, which opened in 1893. Initially, there was only Forest Mill nearby but, by 1900, around twelve textile mills had opened in the vicinity to take advantage of the railways. A new stone-built station building was built across the course of the first 25 years of the station's lifespan. The engine shed closed in 1931. The station closed to passengers on 10 September 1951. but it remained open for excursions and goods traffic until 2 November 1964. A private siding remained for a short time. The station was demolished in 1971.

| Preceding station | Disused railways | Following station |
|---|---|---|
| Lindean; Line and station closed | Selkirk and Galashiels Railway | Terminus |
