= Caddon Water =

River in Scottish Borders, Scotland

Coordinates: 55°36′N 2°53′W

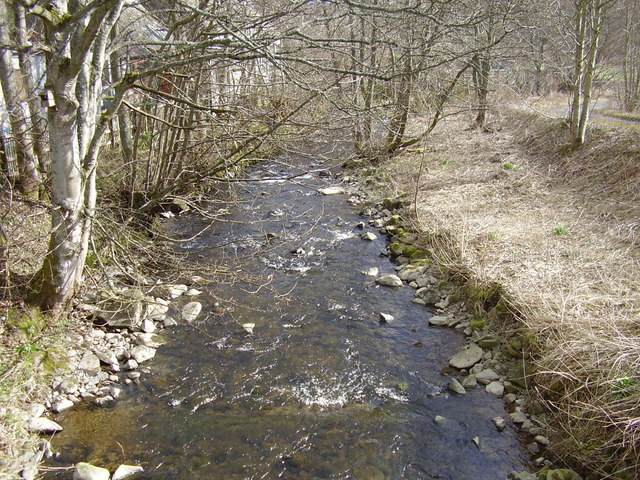

The Caddon Water (Scottish Gaelic: Cadan) is a small river by the village of Caddonfoot, in the Scottish Borders area of Scotland. It rises on Windlestraw Law, four miles north of Innerleithen, and flows through the Stantling Craig Reservoir. It joins the river Tweed at Caddonfoot, having completed its journey after 11 miles (18 km).

== Etymology ==
The name Caddon, recorded as Kaledene in 1296, has a Brittonic origin. The second part of the name is the nominal or locative suffix -onā. The first element may be *calet, which survives in Welsh as caled meaning "hard". An initial element of cad meaning "a battle", is also a possibility.

== See also ==
- List of places in the Scottish Borders
- List of places in Scotland
