= Tibbie Tamson =

British folklore

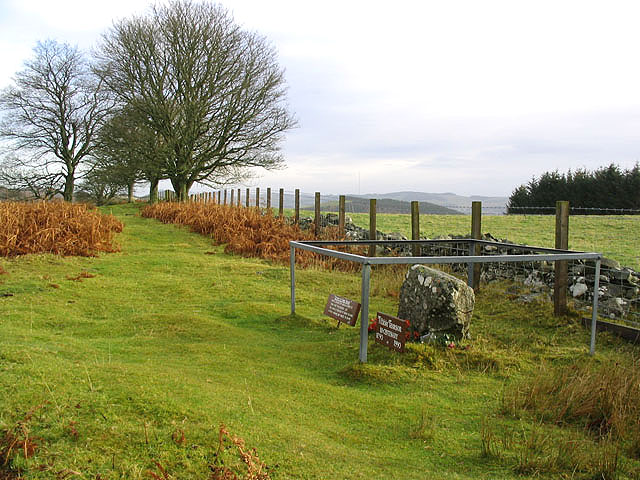
Tibbie Tamson's grave on Foulshiels Hill, near Philiphaugh

Isabella Thomson (d.1790), usually known by the dialect form of her name Tibbie Tamson, was a Scottish woman who lived in the royal burgh of Selkirk in the Scottish Borders during the 18th century. Her isolated grave is a notable landmark, located on a hillside approximately 1.5 miles north of Selkirk at grid reference NT436296.

== Death and burial ==
Few facts are known about Thomson's life. There is a local tradition that Thomson, who lived in the Kirk Wynd in Selkirk, was a poor woman of weak intellect who was treated with contempt in the town. She is said to have been accused of stealing a length of yarn, and was summoned to the sheriff court to face trial for the crime of petty theft. She took her own life and in common with others judged to have committed the crime of Felo de se her corpse was given to the burgh constable to be buried in unconsecrated ground. At this period in Scotland as in England, suicides were often given a 'profane' burial unless family or friends were able to arrange interment secretly. Accordingly she was placed in a pauper's coffin of deal, which was dragged out of the town while her neighbours threw stones and insults, and was buried on Foulshiels Hill at the point where the Selkirk commonlands joined the estates of Bowhill and Philiphaugh. This practice of the burial of those guilty of Felo de se at the meeting of parish or estate boundaries was found elsewhere in rural Scotland, with a well-known fictional example in James Hogg's Private Memoirs and Confessions of a Justified Sinner (1823). Amongst other points, burial within boundary areas negated the issue of a community having to get permission from a landowner.

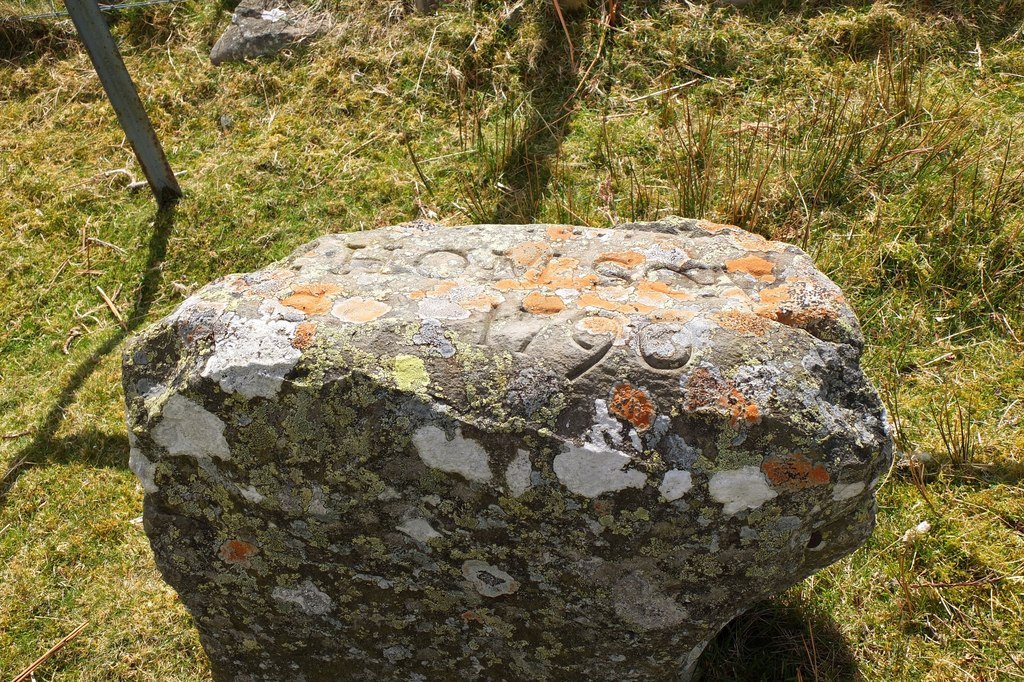
Remains of inscription: "I THOMSON / FS 1790"

At some point after 1790 a rough stone was placed on the grave with "I H / I THOMSON / FS 1790" or "H.L. I.T. F.S. 1790" carved on it ("Here lies Isabella Thomson for suicide [or 'Felo de se'] 1790"). Thomas Craig-Brown, in his two-volume History of Selkirkshire (1886), stated that the stone had been placed there by Michael Stewart, a dyker in the service of the Duke of Buccleuch, who "reopened the grave that he might repair the indecent haste shown at her burial. In the woman's pocket he found one penny and one farthing."

The 19th century essayist John Brown said that the "grave [was] known and feared the country round", while in more recent times it has been described as "a memorial to the worst excesses of small-town unkindness". Each year as part of their traditional perambulation of Selkirk's commons, members of the Selkirk Common Riding Organisation pass by the place and in modern times place a wreath at the grave in remembrance of her.

== See also ==
- Jay's Grave, an example of "ignominious" burial from England
