= Battle of Philiphaugh =

Battle occurring during the Wars of Three Kingdoms

Coordinates: 55.5398°N 2.8857°W

- Part of the Scottish Civil War
- The retreat of Montrose (after the painting by G. Cattermole, 1852)
Date	13 September 1645
Location	Philiphaugh, 2 miles from Selkirk, Scotland
Result	Covenanter Victory

Belligerents
Royalists	Covenanters

Commanders and leaders
Marquis of Montrose	Sir David Leslie

Strength
100 horse 600 musketeers 100 levies	6,000 horse 1,000 foot

Casualties and losses
500	Fewer than 20

Registered battlefield
- Designated: 21 March 2011
- Reference no.: BTL14

The Battle of Philiphaugh was fought on 13 September 1645 during the Wars of the Three Kingdoms near Selkirk in the Scottish Borders. The Royalist army of the Marquis of Montrose was destroyed by the Covenanter army of Sir David Leslie, restoring the power of the Committee of Estates.

== Prelude ==
When the Covenanters became allies of the English Parliamentarians, Montrose was given a commission as King Charles's Lieutenant General in Scotland. He was able to raise an army consisting of regiments of Irish soldiers sent to Scotland by the Irish Confederates and shifting numbers of Highland clansmen. With these troops, Montrose had won a remarkable series of victories in the year preceding the Battle of Philiphaugh. The last of these was at Kilsyth, which destroyed the last Covenanter army in Scotland and put the lowland towns at his mercy.

Montrose refused to allow his army to loot Glasgow, instead accepting a sum of £500 from the Town Council as pay for his soldiers. He then summoned a Parliament to be held in Glasgow. The Council complained at the cost which would be involved and asked to be excused the levy of £500. Montrose agreed, leaving his army without pay. Although Montrose intended to strike into England to aid the King's cause there, the Highlanders under Alasdair MacColla who made up most of Montrose's infantry refused to go any further south leaving their traditional foes, the Campbells, in their rear. At the same time, Montrose appointed the former prisoner, the Earl of Crawford as his Lieutenant General of Horse. Most of his horsemen were Gordons under Lord James Aboyne. Affronted by Crawford's appointment, they too left the army.

Montrose hoped to gain recruits from the Borders, and marched south with only 500 musketeers from his Irish Catholic regiments and a small troop of horse. He made for Kelso, but found that only a few Borders gentry joined his army instead of the thousands of recruits he expected.

Meanwhile, the Earl of Leven, who commanded the main Scottish Covenanter Army in England, had heard of the result of the Battle of Kilsyth, and sent Sir David Leslie, the Lieutenant General of Horse, back into Scotland with all the cavalry he could muster. Leslie collected reinforcements from Covenanter garrisons in Newcastle upon Tyne and Berwick, and crossed the border on 6 September, with 5,000 horse and dragoons and 1,000 infantry. He marched along the east coast intending to cut off Montrose from the Highlands, but learned (possibly from the turncoat Earls of Home and Roxburgh) of Montrose's position and strength, and turned south to intercept him.

== Battle ==
Contemporary accounts give only a broad outline of the battle. Subsequent authors have interpreted this in various ways in an attempt to arrive at a more detailed account.

Montrose himself, many of his officers and some of the cavalry were quartered in the town of Selkirk, with the infantry and the rest of the cavalry encamped on flat ground the other side of the river (the Ettrick Water) at Philiphaugh. Warner puts this just below the junction of the Yarrow Water and the Ettrick Water and hence about 2 miles (3.2 km) away. However, a contemporary description of the Royalist infantry position has them behind on one hand an unpassable ditch, and on the other Dikes and Hedges, and where these were not strong enough, they further fortified them by casting up ditches, and lined their Hedges with Musketeers. Hence other interpretations would put the royalists within field enclosures shown on an 18th-century map between 1 kilometre (0.62 mi) and 1.5 kilometres (0.93 mi) from Selkirk.

Leslie had arrived at nearby Melrose the evening before, and advanced up the valley of the Tweed, driving in the Royalist outposts at Sunderland (at the junction of the Ettrick Water with the Tweed, about 4 kilometres (2.5 mi) downstream of Selkirk) without apparently alarming or alerting the main Royalist force. The following morning was misty, and whatever scouting was undertaken by the Royalists failed to reveal the presence of Leslie's forces. Leslie divided his force into two wings, one of which attacked the Royalist position directly, getting to within half a mile before the alarm was raised. The other executed a flanking manoeuvre, probably on the south bank of the Ettrick Water although some interpretations follow a later ballad and say through hilly ground to the north.

Montrose was alerted to Leslie's attack by the sound of gunfire, but arrived on the battlefield to find his forces in considerable confusion. Although the Royalist infantry's strong defensive position enabled them to repel at least two Covenanter attacks, the arrival of Leslie's flanking force ensured their defeat. After Montrose made a brief attempt to restore the situation by charging 2,000 Covenanter dragoons with only 100 cavalry of his own, he was urged by his friends that the Royalist cause in Scotland would die without him. He cut his way out with 30 men, and retreated over the Minchmoor road toward Peebles.

Many of Montrose's Irish foot soldiers from Manus O'Cahan's regiment had been killed in the battle, but after fighting on for some time after the flight of the cavalry about 100 of them surrendered on promise of quarter. Some Presbyterian Ministers who accompanied Leslie persuaded him that this clemency was foolish, and the prisoners and 300 camp followers (many of them women and children) were slaughtered in cold blood.

In 2011 the battlefield was archaeologically investigated by a community metal detecting and excavation project led by Dr Natasha Ferguson of the Centre for Battlefield archaeology. Only 5% of the 880 artefacts found in the survey were archaeologically relevant however all finds were included in the appendix. Only 2 musket balls, 9 pistol balls, and 2 perhaps 3 pieces of canister shot were found. Approximately 25 copper 17th-century coins and one French coin from 1601-1642 were found, two buckles dated to the 17th-century, one silver button with dubious authenticity, and a possible 17th-18th century horseshoe were found.

== Aftermath ==
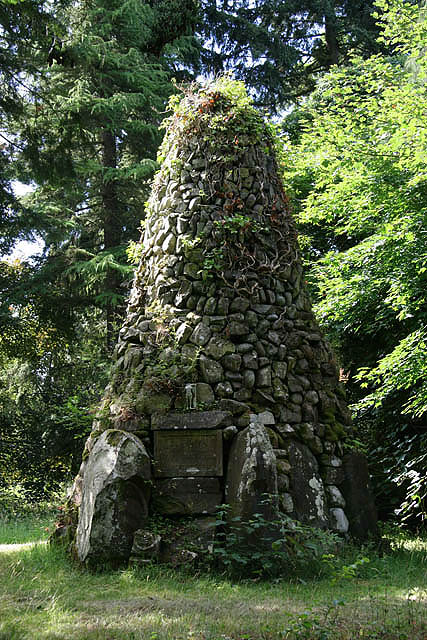
Memorial to the Battle of Philiphaugh

Montrose attempted to raise another army in the Highlands, but was unable to take the field against Leslie's army. After fighting a guerilla campaign over the following winter and spring, he received orders from King Charles (who was now himself a prisoner) to lay down his arms. Montrose, Crawford and Sir John Hurry, who had changed sides to join Montrose after the Battle of Auldearn, were refused pardon by the victorious Committee of Estates and went into exile.

The most likely site of the battlefield is now home to Selkirk Cricket Club and Selkirk Rugby Club, along with a small number of cottages. The site of the battle has been inventoried and protected by Historic Scotland under the Scottish Historical Environment Policy of 2009.

== In popular culture ==
Events tied to the battle were chronicled in "The Battle of Philiphaugh," one of the ballads collected by Francis James Child and published in The English and Scottish Popular Ballads (1882-1898) as Child Ballad 202. The author of the ballad is unknown.

The battle and the Royalist campaign of 1644-1645 in general feature in the 1937 novel And No Quarter by Irish writer Maurice Walsh, told from the perspective of two members of O'Cahan's Regiment, which served during the Wars of the Three Kingdoms in the mid-1640s.

The battle is described by a survivor in John Buchan's 1927 novel Witch Wood. Lord Montrose appears as a minor character.
