= Clovenfords =

Village in Scottish Borders, Scotland, UK

Coordinates: 55°37′06″N 2°52′36″W

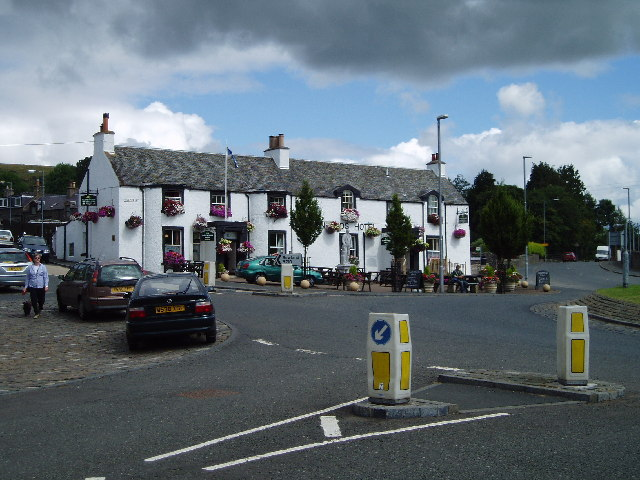
- Clovenfords Hotel

- Location within the Scottish Borders
- Council area: Scottish Borders
- Lieutenancy area: Roxburgh, Ettrick and Lauderdale
- Country: Scotland
- Sovereign state: United Kingdom
- Post town: GALASHIELS
- Postcode district: TD1
- Dialling code: 01896
- Police: Scotland
- Fire: Scottish
- Ambulance: Scottish
- UK Parliament: Berwickshire, Roxburgh and Selkirk
- Scottish Parliament: Midlothian South, Tweeddale and Lauderdale

Clovenfords is a village in the Scottish Borders area of Scotland, 1 mile (2 kilometres) north of the hamlet of Caddonfoot and 4 miles (6 kilometres) west of the town Galashiels. The village sits on undulating grasslands and surrounding rolling hills. The 2011 census gave it a population count of 562 people.

== History ==
Clovenfords began c. 1750 on the stagecoach route between Carlisle and Edinburgh. The village boasted a smithy, a post office and a handful of cottages when Galashiels was only a hamlet dependent on Clovenfords for its mail deliveries and news from the outside world.

The first expansion of the village took place when William Thomson established the Vineries where he grew table grapes which were sold throughout the country. They traveled by overnight train to London to be sold in Covent Garden Market and Harrods. Some were taken on board American bound ocean liners. His book, "A Treatise on the Growing of the Grapevine", was taken worldwide to all the major grape growing areas of the world and was available in public libraries in California, France, South Africa, Australia, New Zealand etc.

== School ==
A new primary school was opened in Clovenfords in 2012, replacing the old building at Caddonfoot which dated back to 1840. The school roll at September 2015 is 93 pupils, and there are 5 FTE teachers. The current Headteacher is Kerry Collins.

== Hotel ==
Clovenfords Hotel is a focal point of the community. It first opened c. 1750, known as Whytbank Inn. Walter Scott stayed frequently at the hotel after he was appointed a sheriff in 1799, and the poet William Wordsworth and his sister Dorothy stayed there in 1803. In 2016, the hotel underwent extensive refurbishment.

== Village hall ==
Caddonfoot Hall is located 1 mile (2 kilometres) south of Clovenfords and hosts regular activities for the people of the village, including Scottish country dancing, yoga, badminton and a children's playgroup. The hall was given to the people of Caddonfoot Parish in 1929 by Lady Louisa Mary Anderson of Yair House, and is managed by a committee of user group representatives.

== See also ==
- List of places in the Scottish Borders
- List of places in Scotland
