= Lindean =

Village in Scottish Borders, Scotland

Coordinates: 55°34′N 2°48′W

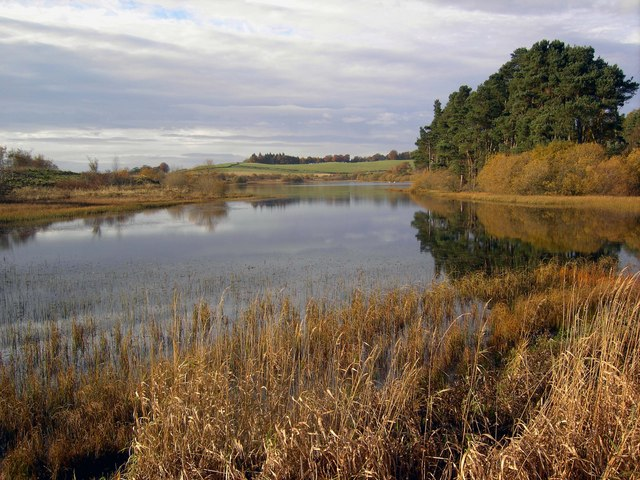
Lindean Reservoir

Lindean is a village north of Selkirk and the Ettrick Water, in the Scottish Borders area of Scotland.

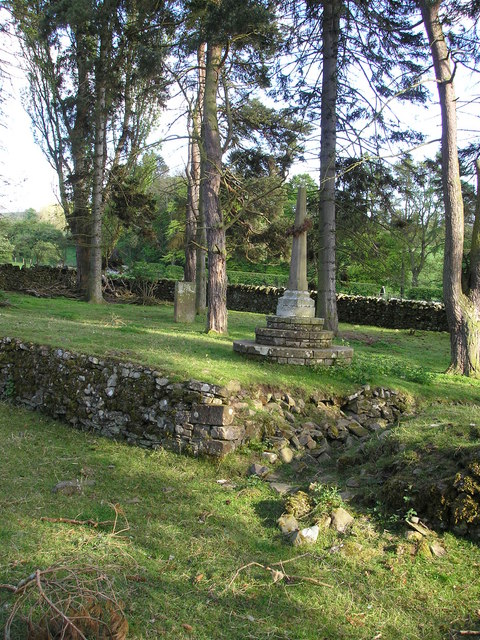
Old Lindean Kirk, abandoned in 1590

In 1590 the parishioners of Lindean had permission to rebuild their church on the north side of the Tweed, at the west end of Boleside, nearer to their houses, and a coble boat was to be provided to ferry the dead over the Tweed if required.

== See also ==
- List of places in the Scottish Borders
- List of places in Scotland
