= Ettrickbridge =

Coordinates: 55.509°N 2.969°W

- Location within the Scottish Borders
- OS grid reference: NT388243
- Council area: Scottish Borders
- Lieutenancy area: Roxburgh, Ettrick and Lauderdale
- Country: Scotland
- Sovereign state: United Kingdom
- Post town: SELKIRK
- Postcode district: TD7
- Dialling code: 01750
- Police: Scotland
- Fire: Scottish
- Ambulance: Scottish
- UK Parliament: Berwickshire, Roxburgh and Selkirk
- Scottish Parliament: Ettrick, Roxburgh and Berwickshire

Ettrickbridge is a village situated in the Scottish Borders region of Scotland, 7 miles (11 km) from the nearby town of Selkirk.

Kirkhope Kirk in Ettrickbridge

It sits on the B7009 road, which follows the Ettrick Water south-west from Selkirk, along the Ettrick Valley as far as Tushielaw (OS grid reference NT305184).

There have been settlements in the area for over a century, but in recent years the population has increased steadily, with new houses being built every year.

Known as Kirkhope until the late 1700s, the erection of the bridge spanning the gap between cliffs either side of the river at the entrance to the village brought about the name "Ettrickbridge".

Kirkhope Tower is a Scottish Pele located a mile north west of the village, near the site of the old chapel or kirk of Kirkhope.

The village is home to Kirkhope Primary School, from where pupils advance to Selkirk High School. Other amenities include a pub (The Cross Keys Inn), a village hall (Kirkhope Hall), football field, tennis court and small children's playground. Until 2006 there was a small Post Office, now closed. Kirkhope kirk in the village was built in 1841.

During the 1983 United Kingdom general election Ettrickbridge was the scene of the "Ettrickbridge summit". David Steel, the leader of the Liberal Party summoned Roy Jenkins, leader of the SDP to his home in the village in what was effectively unsuccessful attempt to replace him as leader of the SDP–Liberal Alliance's campaign.

== See also ==
- List of places in the Scottish Borders
- List of places in Scotland
