= Roxburgh, Ettrick and Lauderdale =

Lieutenancy area of Scotland

Coordinates: 55°30′N 2°30′W

Roxburgh, Ettrick and Lauderdale: Scottish Gaelic: Rosbrog, Eadaraig agus Srath Labhdair
- Location within the United Kingdom
- Lieutenancy area: Roxburgh, Ettrick and Lauderdale
- Police
- Fire
- Ambulance

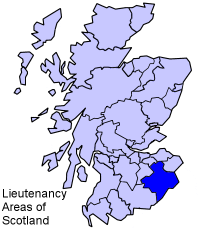

Roxburgh, Ettrick and Lauderdale (Rosbrog, Eadaraig agus Srath Labhdair in Scottish Gaelic) is a lieutenancy area of Scotland. The lieutenancy area was created on 1 April 1996, when local government was reorganised across Scotland under the Local Government etc. (Scotland) Act 1994. The lieutenancy area covers the combined area of the two abolished local government districts of Roxburgh and Ettrick and Lauderdale, which had been nominally separate lieutenancy areas prior to 1996, although both lieutenancies were held by John Scott, 9th Duke of Buccleuch. The lieutenancy area broadly corresponds to the historic counties of Roxburghshire and Selkirkshire, plus small parts of Midlothian and Berwickshire.

== See also ==
Lord Lieutenant of Roxburgh, Ettrick and Lauderdale
