= Ettrick Water =

River in Scotland

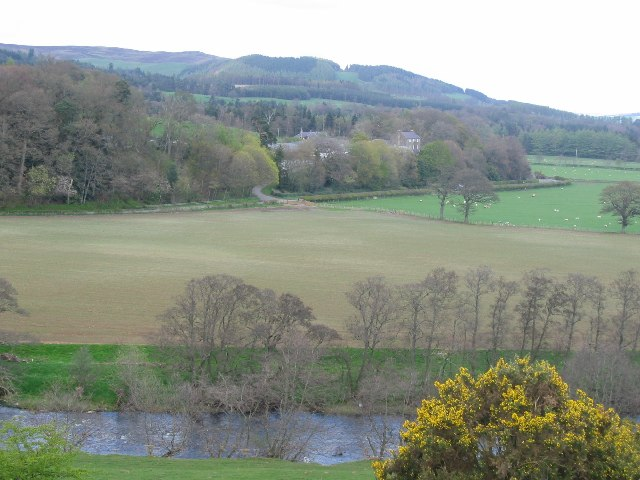

- Location of the confluence in Scotland
- Native name: Uisge Eadraig (Scottish Gaelic)

Location
- Country: Scotland, UK

Physical characteristics
- Source
  - coordinates: 55.344°N 3.307°W
- Mouth: Confluence with the River Tweed
  - coordinates: 55.581529°N 2.811493°W

Basin features
- Grid reference: NT395045

The Ettrick Water (Scottish Gaelic: Uisge Eadraig) is a river in Ettrick, by the village of Ettrickbridge and the historic town of Selkirk, in the Scottish Borders area of Scotland.

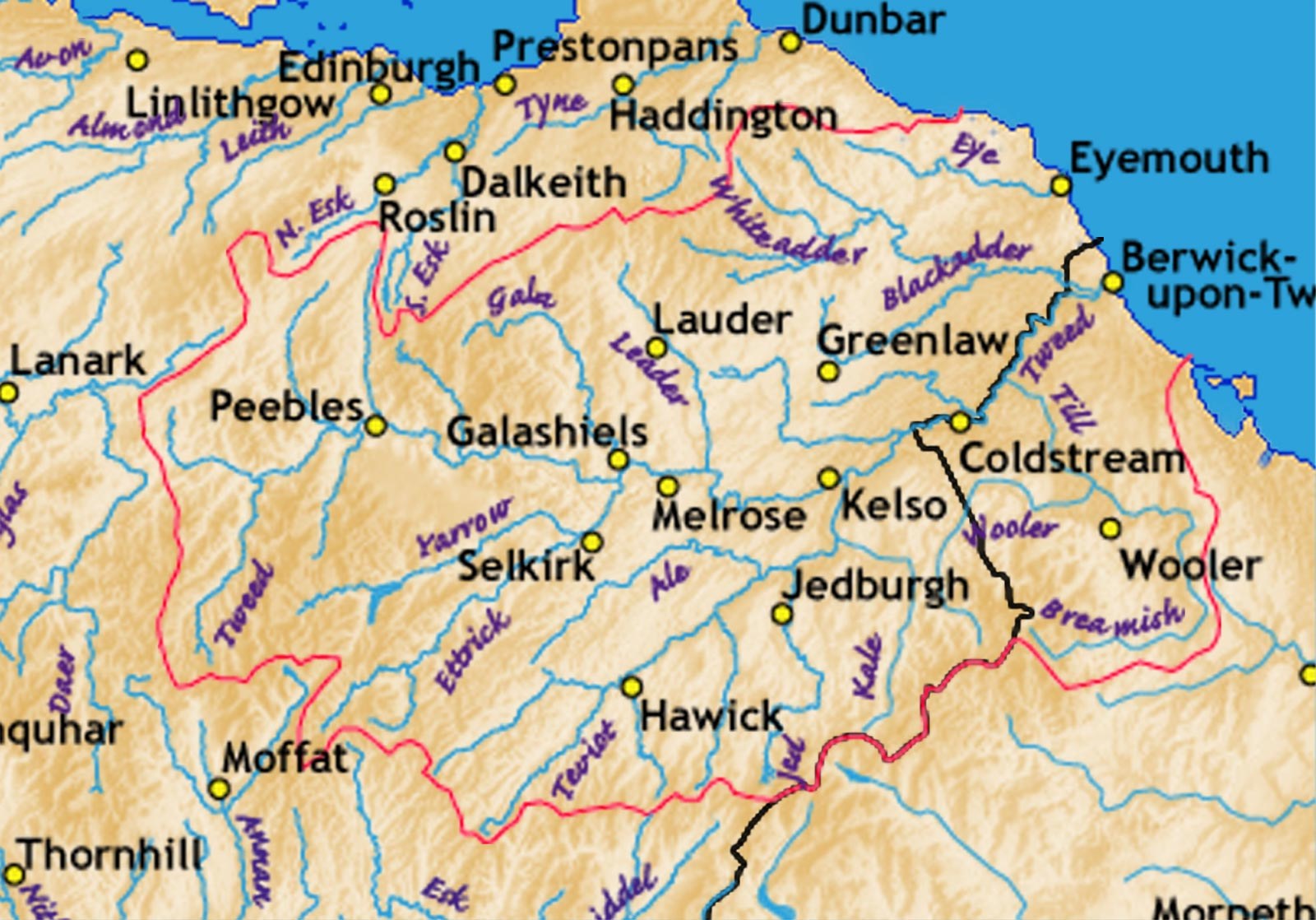
Tweed tributaries

The water, a tributary of the River Tweed, is known also as the River Ettrick, often locally known as Wild Ettrick (though that title refers more correctly to the Ettrick Forest and the Ettrickdale), and it flows through the village, and its flood plain, the Ettrick Marshes. It is the second-fastest rising river in Scotland.

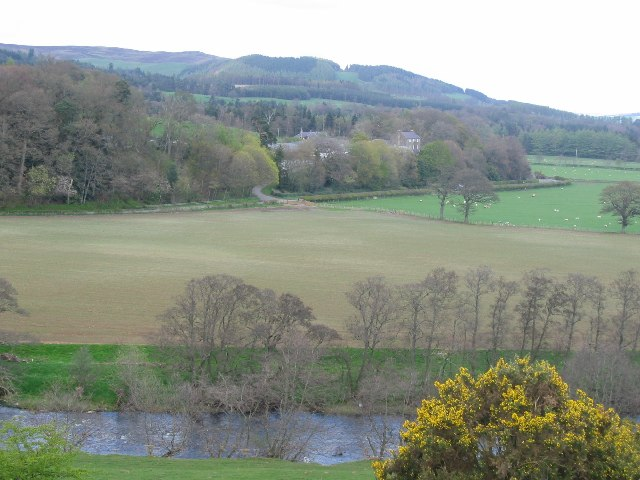
Carterhaugh, near the confluence of the Ettrick Water (foreground) and the Yarrow Water.

Ettrick Water from the air

== See also ==
- Rivers of Scotland
- List of places in the Scottish Borders
- Map sources for: NT171063 - source on Wind Fell / Loch Fell and NT 489323 - confluence with the River Tweed near Sunderland Hall, Lindean.
