= Selkirk, Scottish Borders =

Town in Scotland

Coordinates: 55.550°N 2.84002°W

Selkirk
- Market town and former royal burgh
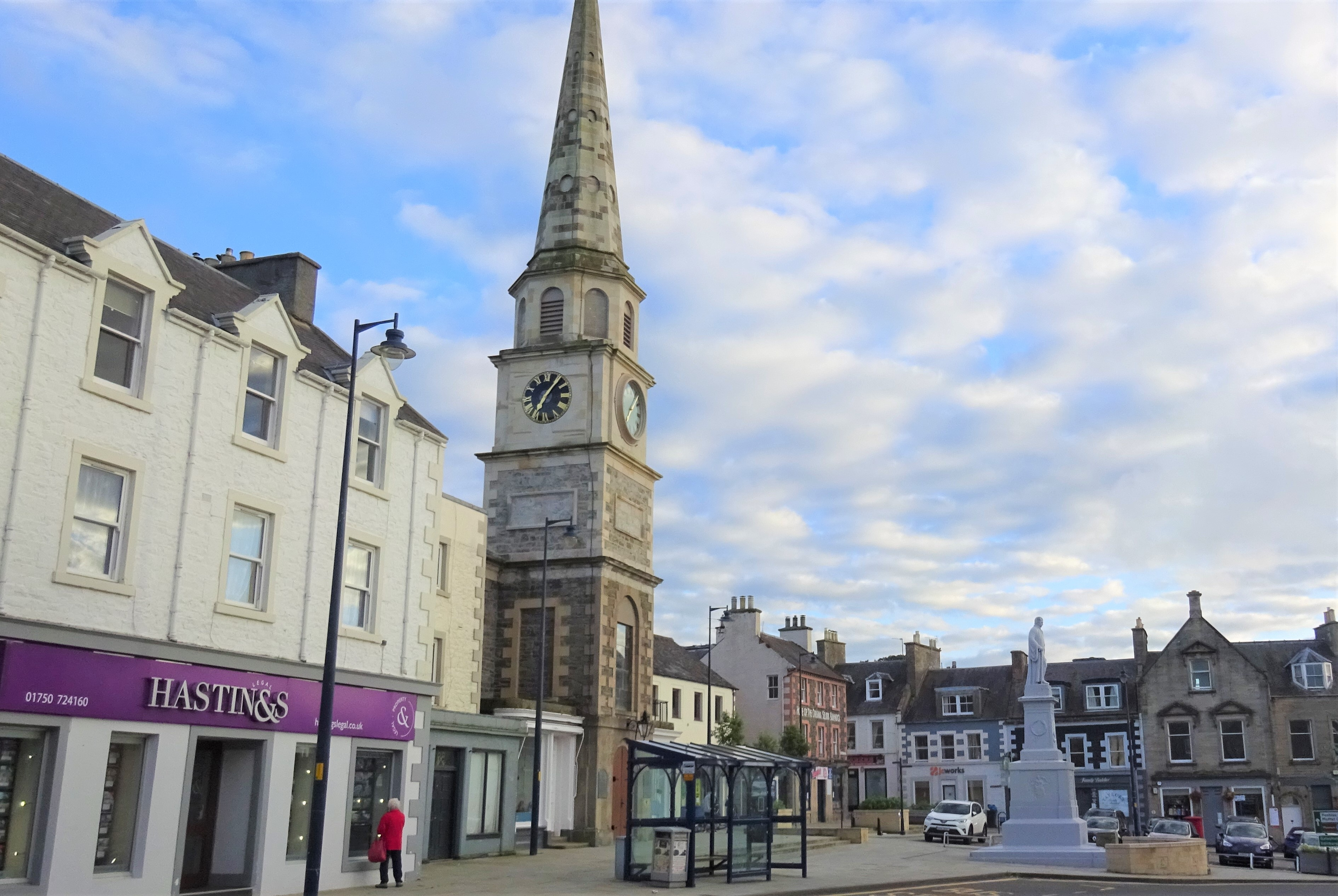
- Selkirk town centre, showing the town house and the statue of Sir Walter Scott

- Location within the Scottish Borders
- Population: 4,663 (2022)
- OS grid reference: NT471288
  - Edinburgh: 31 mi (50 km)
  - London: 301 mi (484 km)
- Council area: Scottish Borders
- Lieutenancy area: Roxburgh, Ettrick and Lauderdale
- Country: Scotland
- Sovereign state: United Kingdom
- Post town: SELKIRK
- Postcode district: TD7
- Dialling code: 01750
- Police: Scotland
- Fire: Scottish
- Ambulance: Scottish
- UK Parliament: Berwickshire, Roxburgh and Selkirk
- Scottish Parliament: Ettrick, Roxburgh and Berwickshire

Selkirk is a historic market town and former royal burgh in the Scottish Borders council district of southeastern Scotland. It lies on the Ettrick Water, a tributary of the River Tweed. The people of the town are known as Souters, which means cobblers (shoe makers and menders). In 2022, Selkirk's population was 4,663, a slight decrease from the 2011 population.

== History ==
=== Early origins ===
Selkirk was formerly the county town of Selkirkshire. Selkirk is one of the oldest Royal Burghs in Scotland and is the site of the earliest settlements in what is now the Scottish Borders. The town's name means "church by the hall" from the Old English sele ("hall" or "manor") and cirice ("church").

Selkirk was the site of the first Borders abbey, a community of Tironensian monks who moved to Kelso Abbey during the reign of King David I. In 1113, King David I granted Selkirk large amounts of land. He also granted the monks access to construction timber and firewood from his woodlands. William Wallace was declared guardian of Scotland in the town at the Kirk o' the Forest in 1297.

=== War of the Three Kingdoms ===
Selkirk sent a contingent of 80 men to fight at the Battle of Flodden in 1513; however, only one man, "Fletcher", returned from the battle, bearing a blood-stained English flag belonging to the Macclesfield regiment.

During the series of conflicts that would become known as the Wars of the Three Kingdoms, Selkirk played host to the Royalist army of James Graham, 1st Marquess of Montrose, with his cavalry installed in the burgh, whilst the Royalist infantry were camped at the plain of Philiphaugh, below the town. On the morning of 13 September 1645, a covenanting army led by Sir David Leslie attacked the royalist forces camped at Philiphaugh, and a rout ensued. Montrose arrived to find his army in disarray and had to flee the field. The surrendered Royalist troops were subsequently executed.

The novelist, Sir Walter Scott, presided, as the sheriff-depute, in the courtroom at Selkirk Town House in the early 19th century.

=== Recent history ===
Selkirk grew in the mid-19th century because of its woollen industry, although that industry largely closed in the 1970s. The town is also known for bannocks, a dry fruit cake, which was first sold in the market place by a local baker, Robbie Douglas, in 1859.

== Culture ==
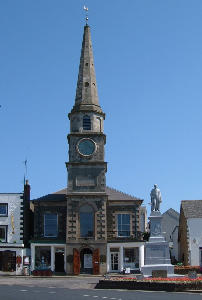
Selkirk Town House in Selkirk Market Place

=== Traditions ===
The Selkirk Common Riding is a celebration of the history and traditions of the Royal and Ancient Burgh. It is held on the second Friday after the first Monday in June.

=== Landmarks ===
The remains of the "forest kirk", referred to in ancient times as the church of St Mary of the Forest, still stand in the old churchyard. It is also the final resting place of several maternal ancestors of Franklin D. Roosevelt, the 32nd President of the US.

Just to the south of the town is The Haining, the late 18th-century residence of the Pringle family. In 2009 the last owner died, and left the house and grounds "for the benefit of the community of Selkirkshire and the wider public." A charitable trust is now planning to restore the building as an art gallery.

=== The Selkirk Grace ===
The Selkirk Grace has no connection with the town of Selkirk, beyond its name; it originated in the west of Scotland. Although attributed to Robert Burns, the Selkirk Grace was already known in the 17th century, as the "Galloway Grace" or the "Covenanters' Grace". It came to be called the Selkirk Grace because Burns was said to have delivered it at a dinner given by the Earl of Selkirk at St Mary's Isle Priory, in Kirkcudbright in Galloway.

In Scots

Some hae meat and canna eat,
And some wad eat that want it,
But we hae meat and we can eat,
Sae let the Lord be thankit.

In English

Some have meat and cannot eat,
And some would eat that want it,
But we have meat and we can eat,
So let God be thanked.

=== Sport ===
Rugby union plays its role in Selkirk culture and society. Selkirk RFC play in their home games at Philiphaugh, competing in the Scottish Premiership and the Border League.

The town cricket club was formed in 1851 and still plays in the Border League. The cricket ground at Philiphaugh is the site of the Battle of Philiphaugh.

The town also has a footballing tradition, having produced some players of note in the Scottish game including Bobby Johnstone of Hibernian. The Selkirk Football Club, founded in 1880 and part of the Lowland League since 2013, folded in 2018 due to financial troubles.

== Media ==
Local news and television programmes are provided by BBC Scotland and ITV Border. Television signals are received from the nearby Selkirk TV transmitter.

Local radio stations are BBC Radio Scotland on 93.5 FM and Greatest Hits Radio Scottish Borders and North Northumberland on 96.8 FM.

The Border Telegraph and Southern Reporter are the town's local newspapers.

== Notable people ==
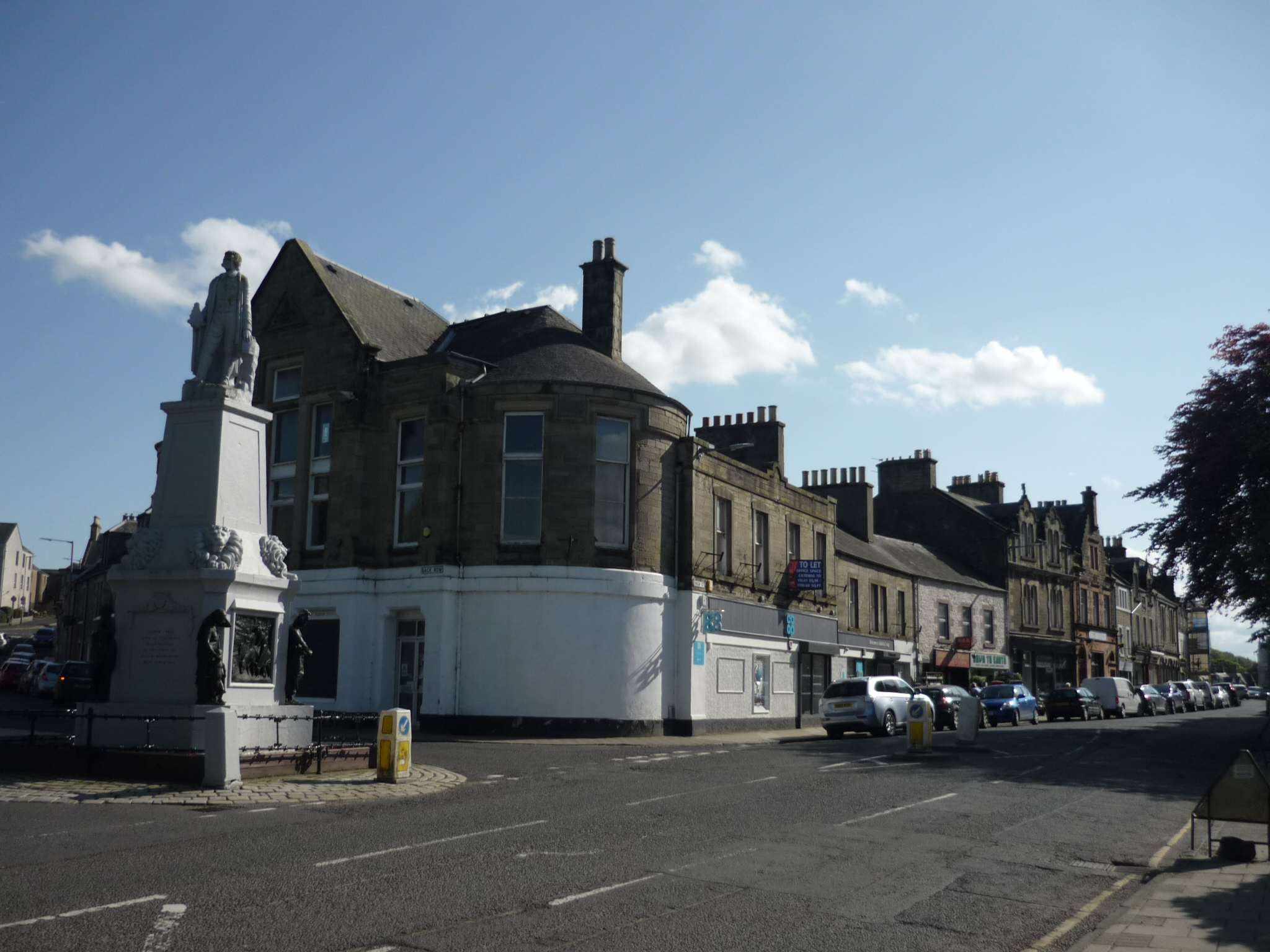
High Street, Selkirk, and the Mungo Park Monument (2018).

- Peter Blake (1948–2018), film and television actor
- James Brown (J.B. Selkirk) (1832–1904), poet and essayist
- James Marr Brydone (1779–1866), surgeon who sighted the French fleet, signalling the beginning of the Battle of Trafalgar
- Rae Hendrie (b. 1977), television actress
- Scott Hutchison (1981–2018), Grant Hutchison (b. 1984) and Billy Kennedy (b. 1984), members of the indie rock band Frightened Rabbit
- Bobby Johnstone (1921–2001), Scotland international football player, member of the Hibernian Famous Five forward line
- Andrew Lang (1844–1912), poet, novelist, literary critic and contributor to anthropology
- Gideon Lang, Australian pastoralist and parliamentarian
- Sandy McMahon (1871–1916), Scotland international footballer and Celtic's eighth highest all-time top goal scorer
- Will H. Ogilvie (1869–1963), Scottish-Australian poet
- Mungo Park (1771–1806), explorer of the African continent
- John Roberts (1845–1934), wool merchant
- John Rutherford (b. 1955), Scotland international rugby player, played for Selkirk R. F. C.
- Tom Scott (1854–1927), artist
- James Sorley (1853–1923) Treasurer of Scottish Life Assurance Company
- Tibbie Tamson, alleged to be variously a victim of the Scottish witch trials, a suicide victim, a plague victim, or a murder victim

== Climate ==
Like the rest of the British Isles, Selkirk has a maritime climate with cool summers and mild winters. However the area appears to have one of the widest absolute temperature ranges in the United Kingdom. The absolute minimum temperature of −26.6 °C (−15.9 °F) at the nearest weather station is both a daily record, and the record lowest temperature for the UK outside of the Highlands. Conversely, Scotland's highest temperature of 32.9 °C (91.2 °F) was recorded at Greycook, St. Boswells just 8 miles (13 km) to the east.

Climate data for Bowhill, 168 m above sea level, 1971–2000, Extremes 1960– (Weather station 2.3 miles (4 km) to the West of Selkirk)
Month	Jan	Feb	Mar	Apr	May	Jun	Jul	Aug	Sep	Oct	Nov	Dec	Year
Record high °C (°F)	12.6 (54.7)	13.9 (57.0)	17.8 (64.0)	25.7 (78.3)	27.5 (81.5)	30.3 (86.5)	31.3 (88.3)	30.1 (86.2)	25.8 (78.4)	22.2 (72.0)	16.0 (60.8)	14.1 (57.4)	31.3 (88.3)
Mean daily maximum °C (°F)	5.3 (41.5)	5.9 (42.6)	8.3 (46.9)	11.0 (51.8)	14.7 (58.5)	17.1 (62.8)	19.2 (66.6)	18.7 (65.7)	15.4 (59.7)	11.7 (53.1)	7.8 (46.0)	5.9 (42.6)	11.8 (53.2)
Mean daily minimum °C (°F)	−0.4 (31.3)	−0.2 (31.6)	1.1 (34.0)	2.4 (36.3)	4.7 (40.5)	7.8 (46.0)	9.8 (49.6)	9.5 (49.1)	7.5 (45.5)	4.8 (40.6)	2.4 (36.3)	0.1 (32.2)	4.1 (39.4)
Record low °C (°F)	−26.6 (−15.9)	−17.2 (1.0)	−15 (5)	−6.1 (21.0)	−4.4 (24.1)	−1.7 (28.9)	1.1 (34.0)	−0.5 (31.1)	−2.3 (27.9)	−6.1 (21.0)	−11.1 (12.0)	−16.4 (2.5)	−26.6 (−15.9)
Average precipitation mm (inches)	95.16 (3.75)	66.33 (2.61)	74.61 (2.94)	55.76 (2.20)	65.4 (2.57)	59.74 (2.35)	58.49 (2.30)	72.11 (2.84)	72.75 (2.86)	86.35 (3.40)	86.11 (3.39)	102.48 (4.03)	895.29 (35.24)
Source: Royal Dutch Meteorological Institute

== Twinning ==
Selkirk is twinned with Plattling, Bavaria.

== See also ==
- Selkirkshire
- Selkirk Rugby Club
- Selkirk Football Club
- List of places in the Scottish Borders
