= List of Category A listed buildings in the Scottish Borders =

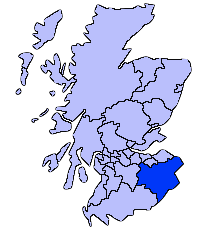
The Scottish Borders shown within Scotland

This is a list of Category A listed buildings in the Scottish Borders council area in south-east Scotland.

In Scotland, the term listed building refers to a building or other structure officially designated as being of "special architectural or historic interest". Category A structures are those considered to be "buildings of national or international importance, either architectural or historic, or fine little-altered examples of some particular period, style or building type." Listing was begun by a provision in the Town and Country Planning (Scotland) Act 1947, and the current legislative basis for listing is the Planning (Listed Buildings and Conservation Areas) (Scotland) Act 1997. The authority for listing rests with Historic Scotland, an executive agency of the Scottish Government, which inherited this role from the Scottish Development Department in 1991. Once listed, severe restrictions are imposed on the modifications allowed to a building's structure or its fittings. Listed building consent must be obtained from local authorities prior to any alteration to such a structure. There are approximately 47,400 listed buildings in Scotland, of which around 8% (some 3,800) are Category A.

The council area of the Scottish Borders covers 4,732 square kilometres (1,827 sq mi), and has a population of around 112,400. There are 182 Category A listed buildings in the area.

== Listed buildings ==
Name	Location	Date listed	Geo-coordinates	Notes	LB number	Image
Torwoodlee House	Torwoodlee, Galashiels		55°37′57″N 2°50′26″W	Mansion built c. 1783.	135	Upload another image
Cranshaws Church	Cranshaws		55°50′56″N 2°29′35″W	Romanesque revival church built 1899.	201	Upload another image See more images
Old Ancrum Bridge	Ancrum		55°30′22″N 2°34′25″W	Late 18th century bridge with three arches.	224	Upload another image See more images
Parish Church of St Cuthbert	Channelkirk, Oxton		55°46′52″N 2°49′42″W	Dated 1817.	1893	Upload another image See more images
Yair House	Yair		55°35′10″N 2°52′10″W	Georgian mansion built by Alexander Pringle of Whytbank.	1899	Upload another image See more images
Yair Bridge	Yair		55°35′01″N 2°51′40″W	Mid-18th century 3 arched bridge spanning the Tweed.	1901	Upload another image See more images
Ashiestiel House	Ashiestiel		55°36′24″N 2°54′21″W	Home of Walter Scott between 1804 and 1812	1902	Upload Photo
Ashiestiel Bridge	Ashiestiel		55°36′22″N 2°53′33″W	Single arch spanning the Tweed, built 1847.	1903	Upload another image
Peel Hospital	Ashiestiel		55°36′22″N 2°54′13″W	Built as a Baronial style mansion c. 1904-07.	1904	Upload another image
Bowden Church and Graveyard	Bowden		55°33′47″N 2°42′29″W	Early 17th century.	1920	Upload another image See more images
The Retreat	Abbey St Bathans		55°50′27″N 2°21′58″W	Late 18th century former hunting lodge.	1971	Upload another image
Ayton Castle	Ayton		55°50′44″N 2°06′54″W	A large Scots Baronial house, built 1845-51 by James Gillespie Graham.	1987	Upload another image See more images
Ayton Castle, Dovecot	Ayton		55°50′47″N 2°06′47″W	16th century circular-plan beehive dovecot.	1989	Upload Photo
Broughton Place	Broughton, Glenholm and Kilbucho		55°37′14″N 3°24′14″W	Scottish country house designed by Sir Basil Spence, 1935-1938, with later alterations.	2031	Upload another image See more images
Portmore House	Eddleston		55°43′37″N 3°11′42″W	Baronial style mansion, built 1850 by David Bryce, restored after fire in 1883.	2037	Upload another image See more images
Westgate Hall	Denholm		55°27′24″N 2°41′05″W	17th century.	2052	Upload another image See more images
Crailing House	Crailing		55°30′43″N 2°29′41″W	Built 1803, designed by local architect, William Elliot.	2080	Upload Photo
Cowdenknowes	Earlston		55°37′30″N 2°40′22″W	16th century mansion house.	2120	Upload another image
Mellerstain House	Gordon		55°38′39″N 2°33′41″W	The two wings built 1725 by William Adam, the main block by his son Robert about 40 years later.	2123	Upload another image See more images
Mellerstain House, Stables and Cottage Block	Gordon		55°38′39″N 2°33′44″W		2124	Upload Photo
Edrom Parish Church	Edrom		55°47′44″N 2°16′36″W	Cross-plan church rebuilt 1737 utilising foundations of earlier church. 1886 Restoration with additions.	2127	Upload another image See more images
Nisbet House	Duns		55°45′14″N 2°19′41″W		2131	Upload another image See more images
Nisbet Dovecot	Nisbethill, Duns		55°44′55″N 2°19′33″W	Unique pentagon-plan dovecot, built late 18th century.	2132	Upload another image See more images
Kalemouth Suspension Bridge, over River Teviot	Kalemouth		55°32′24″N 2°27′49″W	Chain-link suspension bridge, 180 ft (55 m) long, built c. 1830.	3849	Upload another image See more images
Wedderburn Castle, Lion Gate and Boundary Walls	Duns		55°46′19″N 2°18′43″W	Built 1790s.	4029	Upload another image See more images
Manderston	Duns		55°46′56″N 2°18′12″W	Classical house c. 1790, with reconstruction and extension by John Kinross, 1901-5.	4033	Upload another image See more images
Manderston, Stables	Duns		55°47′05″N 2°18′28″W	Stable and carriage house block, dated 1895, by John Kinross.	4034	Upload another image
Old Manor House (Sparrow Castle)	Cockburnspath		55°55′55″N 2°21′43″W		4046	Upload Photo
Market Cross	Cockburnspath, The Square		55°55′57″N 2°21′46″W		4047	Upload another image See more images
Pease Bridge	A1107, Cockburnspath		55°55′21″N 2°20′07″W	Built 1786, with 4 arches spanning the Pease Glen.	4054	Upload another image
Coldingham Priory	Coldingham		55°53′12″N 2°09′19″W	On the site of an 11th century church which has been damaged and rebuilt several times. Remodeled in 1662 with further work in 1851-55.	4059	Upload another image See more images
Lennel House	Coldstream		55°39′37″N 2°14′15″W		4068	Upload another image
The Hirsel	Coldstream		55°39′36″N 2°16′22″W	Georgian house, mostly early 18th century, with Victorian alterations and additions.	4069	Upload another image See more images
Coldstream Bridge	Coldstream		55°39′16″N 2°14′31″W	Built 1763-66 by John Smeaton with 20th century alterations (Note: Also in England, listed at grade II*, Historic England. "Details from listed building database (1153712)". National Heritage List for England.)	4075	Upload another image See more images
Cranshaws Castle	Cranshaws		55°50′54″N 2°30′34″W	Possibly late 14th century with later alterations.	4093	Upload another image See more images
Market Cross	Coldingham, The Square		55°53′13″N 2°09′28″W	Dated 1815.	4094	Upload another image
Renton House	Grantshouse		55°52′50″N 2°17′06″W	Early 18th century with later additions and alterations.	4105	Upload another image
Duns Castle	Duns		55°46′56″N 2°21′21″W	Tower house, c. 1320, incorporated in substantial later additions and alterations.	4108	Upload another image See more images
Bughtrig House	Leitholm		55°41′46″N 2°19′34″W	Late 18th to early 19th century house remodelled late 19th century.	4114	Upload another image
Kames House	Leitholm		55°42′08″N 2°20′51″W		4115	Upload Photo
Preston Bridge	Preston		55°48′14″N 2°20′28″W	Humped-back 3-arched bridge dated 1770.	4120	Upload another image
Ninewells Dovecot	Chirnside, Kirkgate		55°47′55″N 2°12′32″W	16th century.	4124	Upload Photo
Cockburnspath Church and Graveyard	Cockburnspath		55°55′55″N 2°21′45″W		4129	Upload another image See more images
Chesters House	Ancrum		55°29′41″N 2°37′17″W	Late 18th century.	4174	Upload another image See more images
Dovecot, Knowesouth	Bedrule		55°29′06″N 2°37′25″W	Late 18th century.	4182	Upload Photo
Chirnside Primary School	Chirnside		55°47′53″N 2°12′25″W	Built by Reid and Forbes, 1937-1938, with later additions and alterations.	6620	Upload another image
Kirkhope Tower	Ettrickbridge		55°30′55″N 2°59′08″W		6720	Upload another image See more images
Market Cross	Greenlaw, The Square		55°42′25″N 2°27′39″W		6823	Upload another image
Thirlestane Castle	Lauder		55°43′20″N 2°44′37″W	Late 16th century with later additions and alterations.	8203	Upload another image See more images
The Kirna, also known as Kirna House, and Grangehill	Walkerburn		55°37′34″N 3°01′57″W	Built by F T Pilkington, 1867, for George Ballantyne.	8323	Upload another image See more images
Prefabricated cast-iron urinal	Walkerburn, Galashiels Road		55°37′26″N 3°01′11″W	Built c. 1897.	8326	Upload another image
Longformacus House	Longformacus		55°48′29″N 2°29′13″W	Early 18th century with 18th and 19th century additions and alterations.	8344	Upload another image See more images
Longformacus House, Dovecot	Longformacus		55°48′32″N 2°29′14″W	Early to mid 18th century.	8345	Upload another image
St Mary's Church, Ladykirk	Ladykirk		55°43′20″N 2°10′43″W		8349	Upload another image See more images
West Lodge, Ladykirk House	Ladykirk		55°42′09″N 2°12′03″W	Dated 1799.	8351	Upload another image
Spitalhaugh House	West Linton	4 November 2010	55°43′59″N 3°20′05″W		8361	Upload Photo
Tentyfoot Tower	Branxholme		55°23′46″N 2°50′50″W		8397	Upload Photo
Floors Castle	Kelso		55°36′17″N 2°27′36″W	Built by William Adam, 1721-6, possibly incorporating earlier fabric, and remodelled by W H Playfair, 1837-1845.	10480	Upload another image See more images
Greenlaw Church	Greenlaw		55°42′29″N 2°27′38″W		10490	Upload another image See more images
Old Market Cross in Churchyard	Greenlaw		55°42′28″N 2°27′38″W		10491	Upload another image
Greenlaw Court House	Greenlaw, The Square		55°42′26″N 2°27′39″W	Built 1829, architect was John Cunningham.	10492	Upload another image See more images
Castle Inn	Greenlaw, The Square		55°42′23″N 2°27′39″W	Early 19th century.	10493	Upload Photo
Paxton House	Paxton		55°45′40″N 2°06′36″W		10506	Upload another image See more images
Fogo Kirk	Fogo		55°44′08″N 2°21′49″W		10512	Upload another image See more images
Fogo Bridge	Fogo		55°44′08″N 2°22′05″W	Single span round-arched bridge dated 1641 and rebuilt 1843.	10513	Upload another image
Gifford Stones House	West Linton, Main Street		55°45′08″N 3°21′21″W	Late 19th century with elaborately carved 17th century stone inset panels.	12888	Upload Photo
Glenmayne House	Galashiels		55°35′41″N 2°47′51″W		12929	Upload another image
Nether Road, Gala Fairydean Football Stadium			55°36′23″N 2°47′03″W		50711	Upload another image See more images
Stoneyhill House	Walkerburn, Galashiels Road		55°37′29″N 3°00′48″W		12930	Upload Photo
Scott-Douglas Mausoleum	Springwood, Kelso		55°35′42″N 2°27′18″W	Neo-classical temple mausoleum by James Gillespie Graham, c. 1820 – c. 1825	12952	Upload another image
Edgerston House	Jedburgh		55°23′49″N 2°29′25″W		13360	Upload Photo
Ferniehurst Castle	Jedburgh		55°27′16″N 2°33′04″W	Late 16th century, considerably altered subsequently and restored 1883, 1938 and 1987-90.	13369	Upload another image See more images
Ferniehurst Castle, Visitor Centre (Former Chapel)	Jedburgh		55°27′17″N 2°33′03″W		13370	Upload another image
Glenburn Hall	Jedburgh		55°28′23″N 2°34′05″W	Built c. 1815	13371	Upload Photo
Leithen Lodge	Innerleithen		55°40′26″N 3°04′53″W	Early 19th century, with later additions and alterations.	13475	Upload another image
Union Suspension Bridge	Hutton, Fishwick		55°45′09″N 2°06′25″W	(Note: Also in England, listed at grade I, Historic England. "Details from listed building database (1042214)". National Heritage List for England.)	13645	Upload another image See more images
Branxholme Castle	Branxholme		55°23′46″N 2°50′50″W		13686	Upload another image See more images
Swinton House, Dovecot	Swinton		55°42′54″N 2°17′48″W	Dated 1746 and repaired later 20th century.	13850	Upload Photo
Neidpath Castle	Peebles		55°39′07″N 3°12′55″W		13857	Upload another image See more images
Harden	Roberton		55°25′29″N 2°52′17″W	17th century with later additions.	15089	Upload Photo
Railway Viaduct over the River Teviot	Roxburgh		55°33′59″N 2°28′27″W		15097	Upload another image See more images
Abbotsford	Melrose		55°35′58″N 2°46′56″W		15104	Upload another image See more images
Drygrange Old Bridge	Leaderfoot, Newstead		55°36′14″N 2°40′32″W	Late 18th century bridge crossing the River Tweed.	15106	Upload another image See more images
Mertoun House	St Boswells		55°34′40″N 2°36′27″W		15110	Upload another image See more images
Mertoun House, Dovecot	St Boswells		55°34′45″N 2°36′14″W	Dated 1576.	15112	Upload another image
Dryburgh Abbey memorials	Dryburgh, St Boswells		55°34′38″N 2°38′58″W		15114	Upload another image See more images
Bemersyde House	Bemersyde		55°35′31″N 2°38′55″W		15120	Upload another image See more images
Leaderfoot Viaduct	Leaderfoot, Newstead		55°36′16″N 2°40′41″W	Former railway viaduct spanning the River Tweed, built 1865.	15145	Upload another image See more images
Sundial, Lamancha	West Linton		55°45′25″N 3°16′37″W	Late 17th century.	15177	Upload another image
The Haining	Selkirk		55°32′35″N 2°50′35″W		15190	Upload another image See more images
The Haining, Stables	Selkirk		55°32′35″N 2°50′40″W		15191	Upload another image
Aikwood Tower	Selkirk		55°31′29″N 2°55′13″W	Early 17th century tower.	15195	Upload another image See more images
Bowhill House	Selkirk		55°32′26″N 2°54′41″W		15196	Upload another image See more images
Neidpath Railway Viaduct	Peebles		55°38′57″N 3°13′14″W	Former railway viaduct crossing the River Tweed, opened 1864.	15206	Upload another image See more images
Newton Don	Stichill		55°37′39″N 2°27′49″W		15220	Upload another image
Swinton House	Swinton		55°43′01″N 2°17′27″W	Dated 1800 with later additions and alterations.	15339	Upload Photo
Barns House, Stables	Peebles		55°38′21″N 3°14′54″W		15362	Upload Photo
Stobo Castle	Stobo, Peebles		55°36′59″N 3°18′53″W		15379	Upload another image See more images
Polwarth Church	Polwarth		55°44′17″N 2°23′59″W		15384	Upload another image See more images
Marchmont House	Greenlaw		55°43′45″N 2°24′38″W		15386	Upload another image See more images
Marchmont Estate, Dovecot	Greenlaw		55°44′30″N 2°23′02″W		15388	Upload another image
Traquair House	Traquair		55°36′30″N 3°03′50″W		15429	Upload another image See more images
Traquair House, Bear Gates and Avenue Head Cottages	Traquair		55°36′19″N 3°04′16″W		15430	Upload another image See more images
Kailzie, Dovecote	Peebles		55°38′09″N 3°08′32″W	Dated 1698.	15439	Upload Photo
Lessudden House	St Boswells		55°34′29″N 2°38′17″W		17412	Upload another image
Hoselaw Chapel	Kirk Yetholm		55°34′45″N 2°18′58″W		18799	Upload another image See more images
Traquair House, Summerhouse	Traquair		55°36′21″N 3°03′57″W	Dated 1834.	19391	Upload another image See more images
The Studio (former Bernat Klein Studio)	High Sunderland, Selkirk		55°34′24″N 2°50′10″W	Late Modernist building, 1972, designed by Peter Womersley.	19484	Upload another image See more images
Whim House, Court of Offices	West Linton		55°46′09″N 3°15′16″W		19724	Upload Photo
Wedderlie House	Westruther		55°45′21″N 2°34′34″W		19740	Upload another image
The Glen	Traquair		55°35′09″N 3°06′55″W		19746	Upload another image See more images
Chester House	Eyemouth, Church Street		55°52′17″N 2°05′22″W	Mid 18th century.	31128	Upload Photo
Gunsgreen House	Eyemouth		55°52′21″N 2°05′08″W		31133	Upload another image See more images
Old Gala House	Galashiels, Scott Crescent		55°36′50″N 2°48′31″W		31973	Upload another image See more images
Kingsknowes	Galashiels, Selkirk Road		55°36′13″N 2°47′00″W		31999	Upload Photo
Woodlands	Galashiels, Windyknowe Road		55°37′10″N 2°49′10″W		32002	Upload Photo
Tower Mill	Hawick, Kirkstile		55°25′16″N 2°47′18″W		34619	Upload another image
Hawick Town Hall	Hawick, High Street		55°25′21″N 2°47′12″W		34634	Upload another image See more images
Equestrian Statue	Hawick, High Street		55°25′28″N 2°47′05″W		34645	Upload another image
Newgate	Jedburgh, Abbey Place		55°28′38″N 2°33′19″W		35457	Upload another image
Canongate Bridge	Jedburgh		55°28′41″N 2°33′04″W	16th century.	35471	Upload another image See more images
Jedburgh Castle Old Jail	Jedburgh, Castlegate		55°28′27″N 2°33′32″W		35482	Upload another image See more images
3-5 (Odd Nos) Exchange Street	Jedburgh		55°28′40″N 2°33′20″W		35520	Upload another image
11 Exchange Street	Jedburgh		55°28′41″N 2°33′21″W		35522	Upload another image See more images
Jedburgh Old Parish Church	Jedburgh, Newcastle Road		55°28′29″N 2°33′14″W		35581	Upload another image See more images
St John's Episcopal Church	Jedburgh, The Pleasance		55°28′53″N 2°33′14″W		35589	Upload another image See more images
Queen Mary's House	Jedburgh, Queen Street		55°28′43″N 2°33′10″W	Late 16th century house.	35591	Upload another image See more images
Kelso Old Parish Church	Kelso, Abbey Row		55°35′53″N 2°25′52″W		35696	Upload another image See more images
Ednam House Hotel	Kelso, Bridge Street		55°35′51″N 2°26′04″W		35716	Upload another image
Bridge-End Cottage	Kelso, Bridge Street		55°35′45″N 2°25′58″W		35724	Upload Photo
Kelso Bridge	Kelso		55°35′43″N 2°26′00″W	Built 1800-1803 to replace a bridge destroyed in a flood in 1797.	35764	Upload another image See more images
St John's Edenside and Ednam Church Of Scotland	Kelso, Roxburgh Street		55°36′02″N 2°26′13″W		35800	Upload another image See more images
Walton Hall	Kelso, Roxburgh Street		55°36′06″N 2°26′26″W		35805	Upload Photo
Walton Hall, entrance gateways and wall	Kelso, Roxburgh Street		55°36′06″N 2°26′26″W		35806	Upload Photo
Floors Castle, gates and gate lodges	Kelso		55°36′09″N 2°26′34″W		35811	Upload another image
Springwood Park, Gateway and Gates	Kelso		55°35′38″N 2°26′08″W		35826	Upload Photo
Teviot Bridge	Kelso		55°35′41″N 2°26′46″W		35847	Upload another image
Lauder Church	Lauder, East High Street		55°43′08″N 2°44′54″W		37200	Upload another image See more images
Darnick Tower	Darnick, Tower Road		55°36′03″N 2°44′39″W		37756	Upload another image See more images
Market Cross	Melrose, Market Square		55°35′50″N 2°43′10″W		37794	Upload another image
Melrose railway station	Melrose, Palma Place		55°35′48″N 2°43′14″W	Opened 1849.	37803	Upload another image See more images
St Helen's	Melrose, Waverley Road		55°36′14″N 2°44′14″W		37811	Upload Photo
Chambers Institution	Peebles, High Street		55°39′06″N 3°11′21″W		39180	Upload another image See more images
Town House	Peebles, High Street		55°39′05″N 3°11′23″W		39188	Upload another image See more images
Tweed Bridge	Peebles		55°39′02″N 3°11′34″W		39278	Upload another image See more images
Town House, Old Sheriff Court	Selkirk, Market Place		55°32′50″N 2°50′28″W		40569	Upload another image See more images
Ettrick Mill	Selkirk, Dunsdale Road		55°33′16″N 2°50′21″W	Mid 19th century woollen spinning and tweed manufacturing complex.	40578	Upload another image See more images
War Memorial	Selkirk, Ettrick Terrace		55°32′52″N 2°50′34″W		40581	Upload another image
Manderston, Boat House and Gateway	Duns		55°46′51″N 2°18′12″W	Swiss chalet style boat house, built 1894 by John Kinross.	42505	Upload Photo
Manderston, Buxley, Dairy Court	Duns		55°47′09″N 2°18′19″W		42508	Upload another image
Manderston, Buxley, Dairy Tower with Unicorn Stair	Duns		55°47′09″N 2°18′18″W		42510	Upload another image
Manderston, Buxley, Engineer's House	Duns		55°47′11″N 2°18′22″W		42511	Upload Photo
Manderston, Buxley, Fire Station and Engine House	Duns		55°47′11″N 2°18′20″W		42514	Upload Photo
Manderston, Buxley, Head Gardener's House	Duns		55°47′10″N 2°18′22″W		42516	Upload Photo
Manderston, Pheasantry Wood, Gamekeeper's Cottage with Dovecot	Duns		55°46′58″N 2°17′44″W		42528	Upload Photo
Manderston, Terraces to south and east, including Ram's Horn Stair, urns, Mercury Statue and Griffin Gate	Duns		55°46′56″N 2°18′10″W		42534	Upload Photo
Wedderburn Castle	Duns		55°46′07″N 2°18′25″W		42543	Upload another image See more images
Nisbet House, Stable and Coach House	Duns		55°45′15″N 2°19′40″W		44511	Upload another image
Ayton Parish Church	Ayton		55°50′27″N 2°07′04″W		46451	Upload another image See more images
Paxton House Estate, The Dower House (former Factor's House)	Paxton		55°45′50″N 2°07′00″W		47697	Upload Photo
Stoneyhill Cottage (former Stoneyhill Lodge)	Walkerburn, Galashiels Road		55°37′25″N 3°00′52″W		49134	Upload another image
Sunnybrae Lodge	Walkerburn, Galashiels Road		55°37′25″N 3°00′54″W		49136	Upload Photo
The Glen, Lion Gateway, garden features and terraces	Traquair		55°35′09″N 3°06′57″W		49386	Upload Photo
The Glen, Stable Courtyard	Traquair		55°35′11″N 3°06′56″W		49393	Upload Photo
The Glen, The Temple	Traquair		55°34′49″N 3°07′03″W		49395	Upload Photo
High Sunderland	Selkirk		55°34′49″N 3°07′03″W		50862	Upload another image See more images
Kelso Racecourse, Grandstand	Kelso		55°36′45″N 2°26′12″W		51742	Upload another image See more images

== See also ==
- Scheduled monuments in the Scottish Borders
