= Yair =

Yair may refer to:

== People ==
- Yair (given name), a Hebrew masculine given name
- Yoram Yair (born 1944), Israeli retired major general
- Zvi Yair, pen-name of the Jewish poet and Chassidic scholar Rabbi Zvi Meir Steinmetz (1915–2005)
- Avraham Stern, alias Yair, a leader of the Zionist paramilitary organization Irgun

== Geography ==
- Yair, Scottish Borders, an estate in Scotland
  - Yair Bridge, across the River Tweed
