= Henry Snell Gamley =

Scottish sculptor (1865–1928)

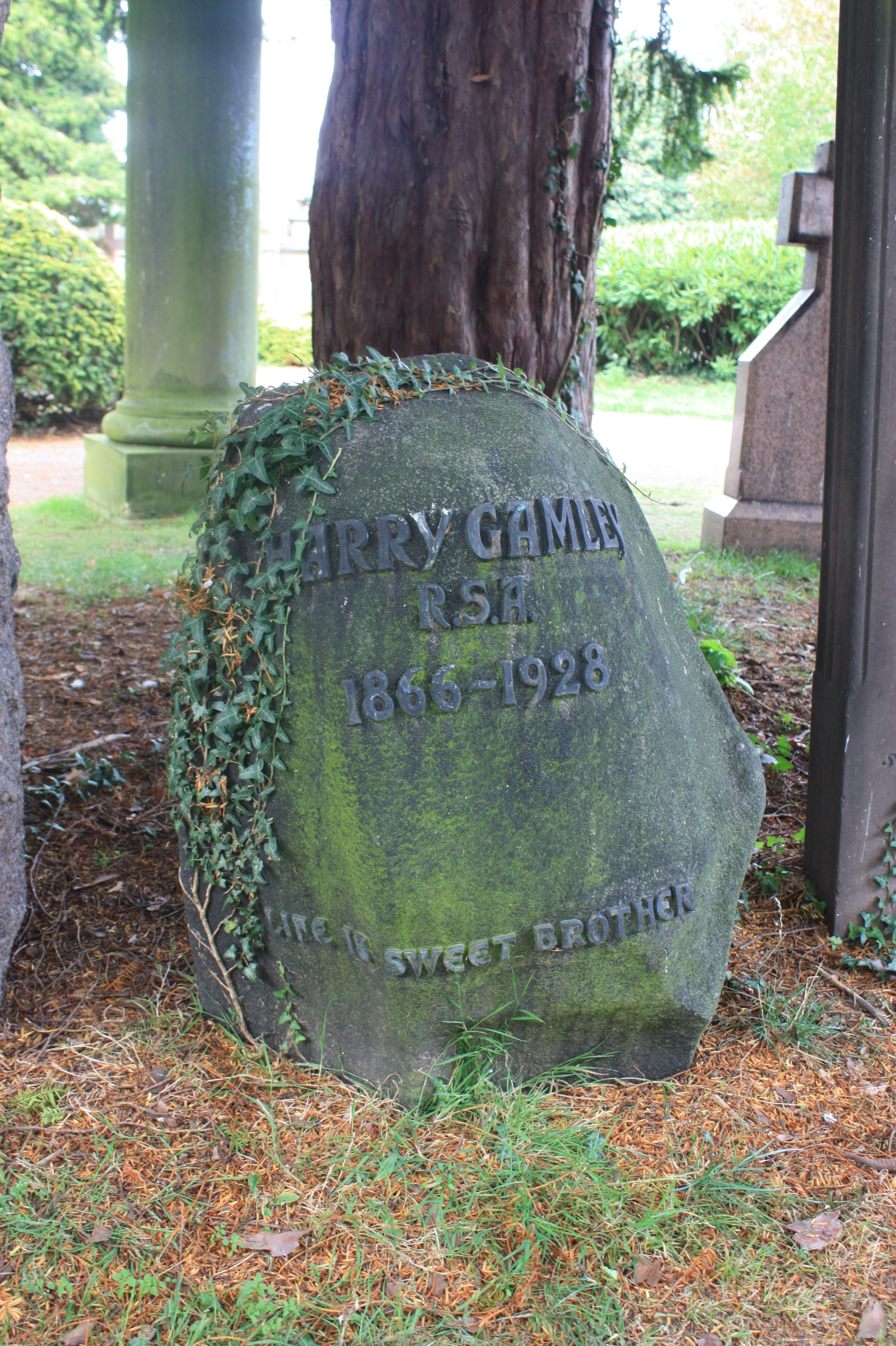
Gamley's grave, Dean Cemetery

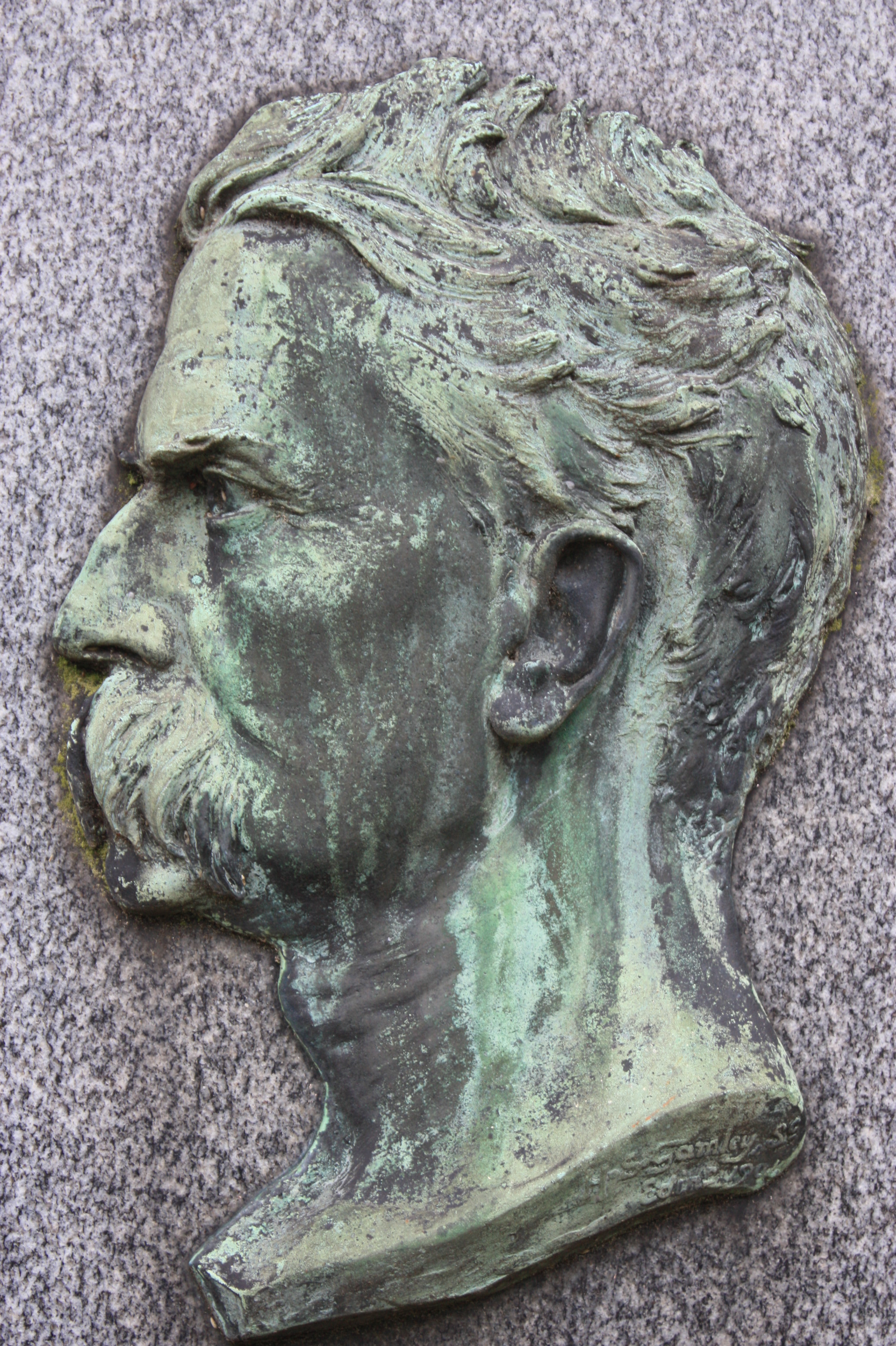
Charles McBride by Henry Snell Gamley

Henry Snell Gamley (1865–1928) was a Scottish sculptor specialising in war memorials and sculpture on tombs. He was however also responsible for other figurative sculpture on prominent Edinburgh buildings such as the Usher Hall and works at Holyrood Palace.

== Life ==
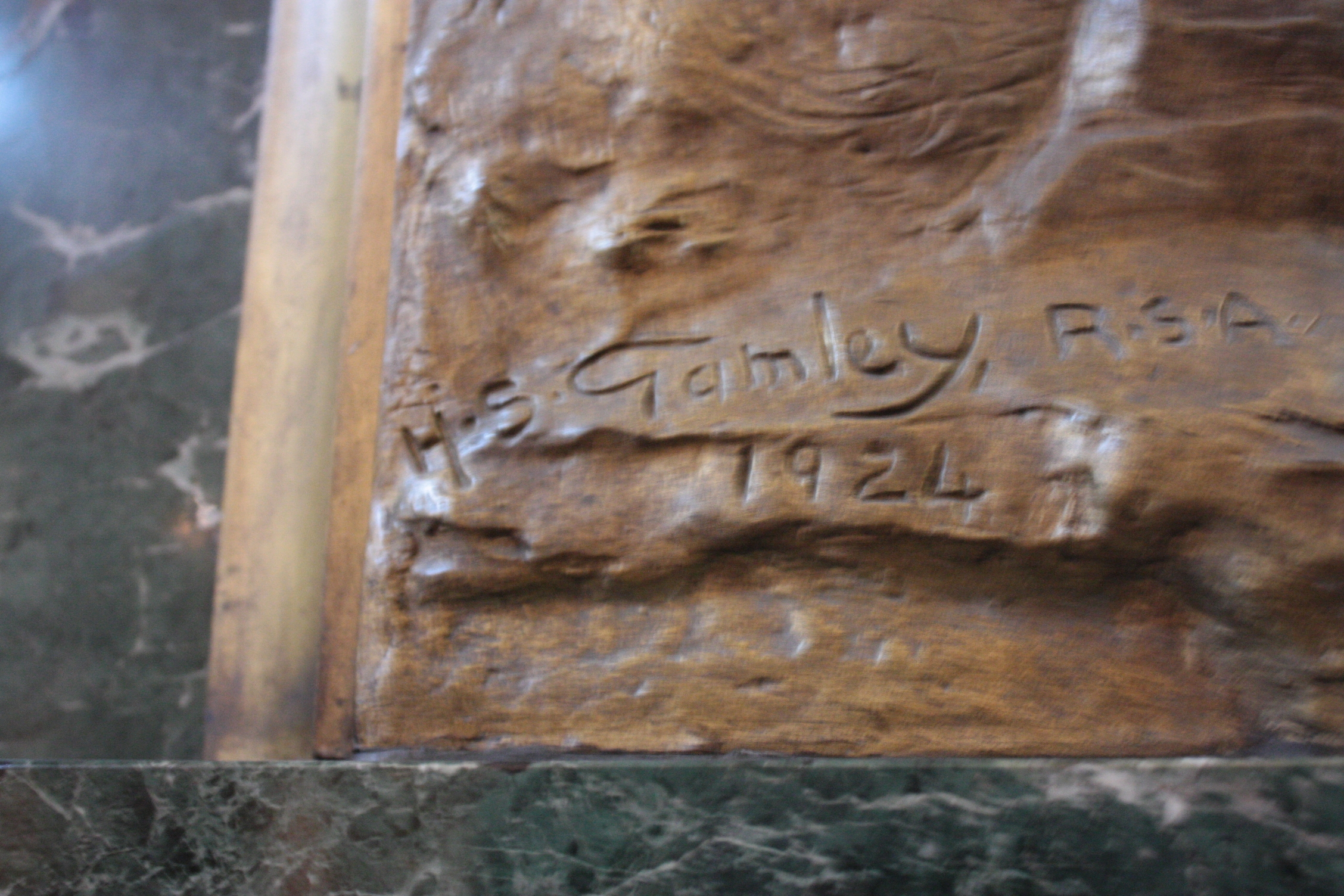
Cast signature of Henry Snell Gamley (St Giles Cathedral Edinburgh

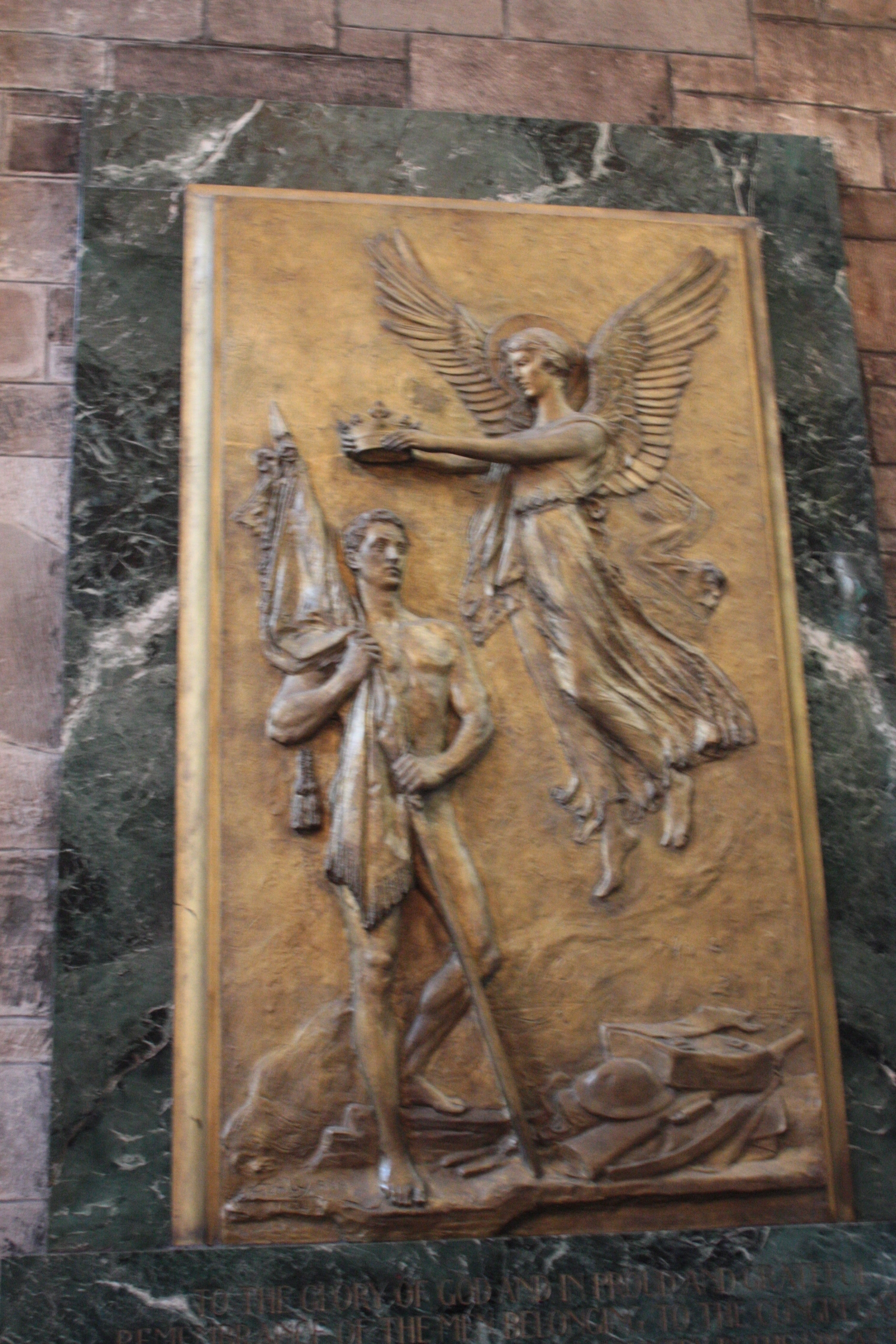
Memorial by H.S.Gamley in St Giles Catrhedral, Edinburgh

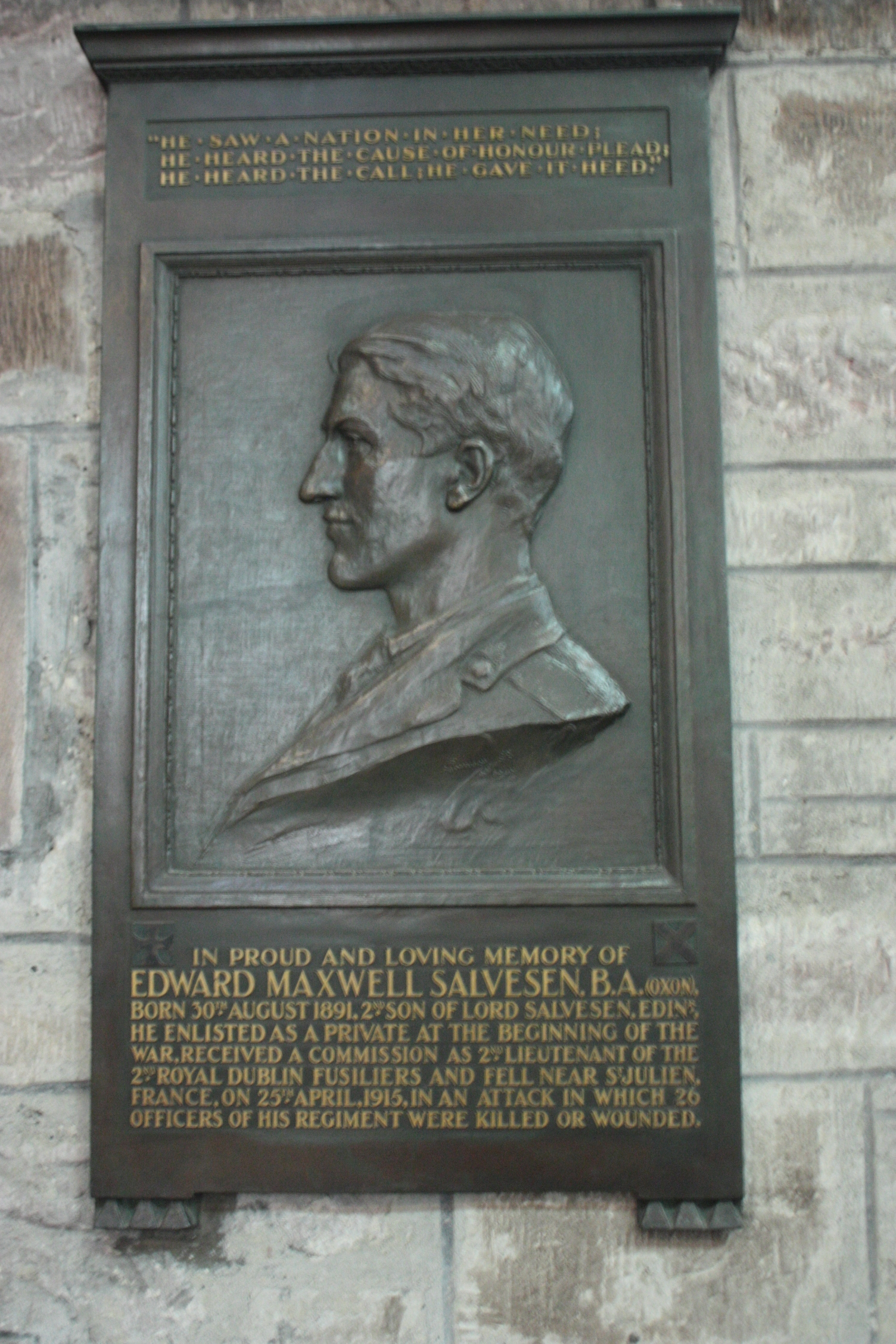
Memorial to Edward Maxwell Salvesen in St Giles Cathedral Edinburgh

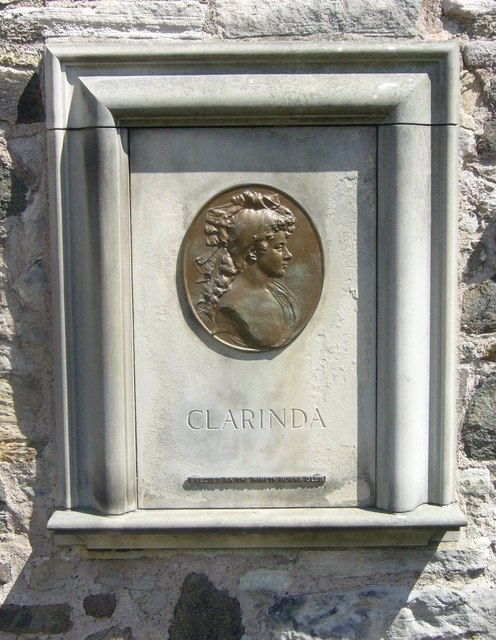
Canongate Kirk, Clarinda's memorial plaque

Gamley was born in Logie-Pert, Craigo near Montrose, Scotland. His family moved to Edinburgh early in his life. He is listed as living in a flat at 7 Montpelier Park in Bruntsfield, Edinburgh in 1908 and having a studio at 4 Hope Street Lane.

He was educated at James Gillespie's High School in Edinburgh and then trained at the Royal Institute under Charles P. Hodder. He then went to London to study under Édouard Lantéri at South Kensington College. He then returned to Edinburgh to study under William Grant Stevenson RSA from 1899–1902.

In 1908 he was elected an Associate of the Royal Scottish Academy (ARSA) and set up his own studio at 4 Hope Street Lane. At this time he was living in a flat at 7 Montpelier Park in the Bruntsfield area.

John Stevenson Rhind sculpted a portrait bust of Gamley in 1892.

A photograph of "H.S Gamley, Sculptor" is listed as item 158 in the 58th annual exhibition of the Royal Photographic Society of Great Britain in 1913.

In 1928 he hired Auguste Rodin’s studio in Paris to work on a statue of Robert Burns for export to Wyoming.

He died on a country estate near Paris, France in 1928. His body was returned to Edinburgh and he is buried off the southern path under a tree in the south-east section of Dean Cemetery in Edinburgh.

== Family ==
He married Margaret Hogg from Carnoustie in 1898. His daughter, Lola Gamley (1899–1971), was an artist.

== Known works ==
- Monument to the sculptor Charles McBride in Dean Cemetery Edinburgh (1903)
- Bust of Major McCaig of Oban (1904) (of "McCaig's Folly" fame)
- Bust of "Fighting Mac" (Hector MacDonald) (1908)
- Bust of Albert, Fiddes Watt's son (1908)
- Memorial plaque to Clarinda in Canongate Kirkyard (1909)
- Memorial to Alexander and Fanny Gamley, (presumed to be his parents) Comely Bank Cemetery (1909)
- Monument to the advocate, William Thomson in Dean Cemetery (1911)
- Bust of Charles Euan Chalmers Guthrie (1911)
- Portrait bust of Fiddes Watt (1912)
- Monument to J.W.Fyfe, Chief Valuer of Scotland, in Dean Cemetery (1913)
- Monument to Andrew Sclanders Nelson (1856-1913) in the Glasgow Necropolis (1913) (sculpture stolen)
- Portrait head on the grave of David Menzies (1854-1912), Grange Cemetery, Edinburgh (1913)
- Bust of Andrew Usher founder of the Usher Hall (1914) for Usher Hall interior
- Figurative sculpture on the Usher Hall, Edinburgh (1914)
- Portrait bust of John Boyd Dunlop, inventor of the pneumatic tyre (1915)
- Bust of William Murdoch inventor of gas lighting (1916)
- Bust of Sir Alexander Russell Simpson (1917) for Carubbers Close Mission
- War Memorial on north wall of St. Giles' Cathedral, Edinburgh (1918)
- Statue of Sir David Stewart of Garth exhibited in RSA (1919) (now at Keltneyburn near Loch Tummel)
- Memorial plaque of the late 2nd Lt. Edward Maxwell Salvesen (nephew of Christian Salvesen) (1919) in north aisle of St. Giles' Cathedral
- Bronze plaque of the Edward Theodore Salvesen, the Rt Hon Lord Salvesen, on his tomb in Dean Cemetery (1920)
- Bust of Joseph Laing Waugh (1920)
- War memorial at Morningside Free Church, Edinburgh (1921) (with John Kinross)
- Statue of Edward VII as part of the Edward VII Memorial at Holyrood Palace (1920–22).
- Restoration of the equestrian statue of King Charles I in Parliament Square, Edinburgh (1922)
- Heart of Midlothian F.C. War Memorial, Haymarket, Edinburgh (1922)
- Montrose War Memorial (1922) (plinth by John Kinross)
- Cupar War Memorial (1922) (with John Kinross)
- Statue of St.Andrew on the Freemasons Hall, George Street, Edinburgh (1922)
- Charles Murray (1925) Provost Skene's House, Aberdeen
- Bust of Robert McVitie of McVitie's biscuit fame (1928)
- Plaster bust of Alastair Adam Inglis (1906) (aged 3 years) son of Francis Caird Inglis, Photographer, Edinburgh.
