= List of listed buildings in Selkirk, Scottish Borders =

This is a list of listed buildings in the parish of Selkirk in the Scottish Borders, Scotland.

== List ==
Name	Location	Date Listed	Grid Ref. (Note: Sometimes known as OSGB36, the grid reference (where provided) is based on the British national grid reference system used by the Ordnance Survey. • "Guide to National Grid". Ordnance Survey. • "Get-a-map". Ordnance Survey.)	Geo-coordinates	Notes	LB Number (Note: Historic Environment Scotland assign a unique alphanumeric identifier to each designated site in Scotland, for listed buildings this always begins with "LB", for example "LB12345".)	Image
Ettrick Terrace, Ettrick Lodge, Ettrick Dene And Coach House With Boundary Wall, Railings And Gateways				55°32′57″N 2°50′32″W	Category B	43748	Upload Photo
2 And 4 Kirk Wynd				55°32′48″N 2°50′29″W	Category C(S)	43790	Upload Photo
7 Market Place, Fleece Hotel				55°32′50″N 2°50′32″W	Category B	43794	Upload another image
Scotts Place, Victoria Halls With Boundary Wall, Gatepiers, Railings And Fountain				55°32′59″N 2°50′19″W	Category B	43811	Upload another image
9 Scotts Place				55°33′00″N 2°50′16″W	Category C(S)	43812	Upload Photo
Station Road, Waterworks And Mill Lade Bridge				55°32′58″N 2°50′46″W	Category C(S)	43819	Upload Photo
1 Thornfield Avenue, Former Lodge With Former Stable And Coach House, Outbuildings And Gatepiers				55°33′06″N 2°50′06″W	Category C(S)	43821	Upload Photo
23-29 (Odd Nos) West Port				55°32′48″N 2°50′35″W	Category C(S)	43832	Upload Photo
2 And 4 West Port				55°32′49″N 2°50′33″W	Category C(S)	43838	Upload Photo
3-11 (Odd Nos) High Street, The County Hotel				55°32′52″N 2°50′29″W	Category C(S)	40572	Upload Photo
36 And 37 Market Place				55°32′48″N 2°50′30″W	Category C(S)	40582	Upload Photo
Ruined Cottage, Foulshiels				55°33′23″N 2°54′59″W	Category B	19725	Upload Photo
Broomhill House With Walled Garden And Horsemill				55°33′28″N 2°49′16″W	Category B	19726	Upload Photo
Aikwood Tower				55°31′29″N 2°55′13″W	Category A	15195	Upload another image
High Sunderland, Galashiels, Including Boundary Walls And Gate Piers				55°34′28″N 2°50′12″W	Category A	50862	Upload another image See more images
Viewfield (Andrew Lang Unit), With Gatepiers And Boundary Walls				55°33′00″N 2°50′23″W	Category C(S)	44179	Upload Photo
Ettrick Terrace, Wellwood With Boundary Walls And Gatepiers				55°33′05″N 2°50′32″W	Category B	43750	Upload Photo
29 And 31 High Street				55°32′52″N 2°50′27″W	Category C(S)	43764	Upload Photo
35-39 (Odd Nos) High Street				55°32′53″N 2°50′27″W	Category C(S)	43765	Upload Photo
103 High Street, Presbytery				55°32′55″N 2°50′23″W	Category C(S)	43774	Upload Photo
109 High Street				55°32′55″N 2°50′21″W	Category C(S)	43776	Upload Photo
6 High Street				55°32′51″N 2°50′27″W	Category C(S)	43778	Upload Photo
38 High Street				55°32′53″N 2°50′24″W	Category C(S)	43782	Upload Photo
50 And 52 High Street				55°32′53″N 2°50′23″W	Category B	43783	Upload another image
High Street, Council Buildings				55°32′55″N 2°50′19″W	Category B	43786	Upload another image
14 Market Place				55°32′51″N 2°50′29″W	Category C(S)	43798	Upload Photo
34 And 35 Market Place And Buildings In Close To Rear				55°32′48″N 2°50′30″W	Category C(S)	43801	Upload Photo
40, 41 And 42 Market Place				55°32′48″N 2°50′31″W	Category C(S)	43803	Upload Photo
49 And 50 Market Place				55°32′49″N 2°50′32″W	Category C(S)	43805	Upload Photo
Scotts Place, Plaque To J B Selkirk (James Brown)				55°32′57″N 2°50′18″W	Category C(S)	43810	Upload Photo
Shawpark Road, Brierylaw And Shawfield Cemeteries With Boundary Walls, Quadrants, Railings, Gates And Gatepiers				55°33′10″N 2°49′47″W	Category C(S)	43818	Upload Photo
31 And 33 West Port				55°32′47″N 2°50′35″W	Category B	43833	Upload another image
37 West Port				55°32′47″N 2°50′36″W	Category C(S)	43835	Upload Photo
41 West Port With Boundary Walls				55°32′47″N 2°50′36″W	Category C(S)	43837	Upload Photo
Dunsdale Road, Forest Mill				55°33′00″N 2°50′46″W	Category B	40580	Upload Photo
Ettrick Terrace, War Memorial				55°32′52″N 2°50′34″W	Category A	40581	Upload another image
40-44 (Even Nos) High Street				55°32′53″N 2°50′24″W	Category B	40584	Upload another image
Ettrick Terrace, Sheriff Court With Boundary Walls, Railings And Gatepiers				55°32′54″N 2°50′35″W	Category B	43747	Upload another image
3 And 5 Heatherlie Park, Woodburn House Hotel And Gatepiers				55°32′43″N 2°50′56″W	Category C(S)	43756	Upload Photo
4 High Street				55°32′51″N 2°50′27″W	Category C(S)	43777	Upload Photo
54 And 56 High Street				55°32′53″N 2°50′23″W	Category C(S)	43784	Upload Photo
8-10 (Inclusive Nos) Market Place And 4 Ettrick Terrace				55°32′50″N 2°50′31″W	Category C(S)	43795	Upload Photo
13 Market Place				55°32′51″N 2°50′29″W	Category C(S)	43797	Upload Photo
21-24 (Inclusive Nos) Market Place				55°32′50″N 2°50′28″W	Category C(S)	43800	Upload Photo
Mavis Bank, Beech Villa And Belmont				55°33′11″N 2°50′17″W	Category C(S)	43806	Upload Photo
15 Scotts Place, With Outbuilding And Timber Shed				55°33′00″N 2°50′15″W	Category C(S)	43813	Upload Photo
35 West Port				55°32′47″N 2°50′36″W	Category C(S)	43834	Upload Photo
6-10 (Even Nos) West Port				55°32′49″N 2°50′33″W	Category C(S)	43839	Upload Photo
Bleachfield Road, St John's Episcopal Church With Church Hall And Boundary Walls				55°33′06″N 2°50′04″W	Category B	43743	Upload Photo
Market Place, Pant Well				55°32′49″N 2°50′31″W	Category B	40568	Upload Photo
Yarrowford, Broadmeadows East Lodge				55°33′37″N 2°55′54″W	Category B	19477	Upload Photo
Bridgelands Including Quadrant Walls, Gatepiers And Gates				55°33′52″N 2°49′30″W	Category B	15202	Upload Photo
Old Broadmeadows Dovecot				55°33′47″N 2°55′41″W	Category C(S)	13855	Upload Photo
Scott's Place, North Side, Wall Letter Box, Opposite Bowling Club				55°33′04″N 2°50′08″W	Category C(S)	49849	Upload Photo
12 Ettrick Terrace				55°32′53″N 2°50′33″W	Category C(S)	43751	Upload Photo
40 Ettrick Terrace With Boundary Walls And Railings				55°32′59″N 2°50′29″W	Category C(S)	43753	Upload Photo
15 And 17 High Street				55°32′52″N 2°50′28″W	Category C(S)	43762	Upload Photo
55-59 (Odd Nos) High Street				55°32′53″N 2°50′25″W	Category C(S)	43771	Upload Photo
73-99 (Odd Nos) High Street				55°32′54″N 2°50′24″W	Category C(S)	43773	Upload Photo
Shawpark Road, Hillcrest, Former Rectory And Boundary Walls				55°33′08″N 2°50′01″W	Category C(S)	43815	Upload Photo
8, 10 And 12 Shawpark Road, Dandswall With Lamp Standard, Boundary Wall And Gatepiers				55°33′09″N 2°49′57″W	Category C(S)	43816	Upload Photo
69 Tower Street With Boundary Wall, Gatepiers And Railings				55°32′51″N 2°50′17″W	Category C(S)	43824	Upload Photo
9 And 11 West Port				55°32′48″N 2°50′33″W	Category C(S)	43830	Upload Photo
Craig Brown Avenue, Reservoir				55°32′47″N 2°50′09″W	Category C(S)	43744	Upload Photo
The Green, The Haining North Gate And Policy Walls				55°32′45″N 2°50′41″W	Category B	40576	Upload Photo
101 High Street, Hermitage House				55°32′55″N 2°50′24″W	Category B	40583	Upload Photo
Newark Castle				55°33′17″N 2°55′11″W	Category A	15197	Upload Photo
Caterhaugh (Carterhaugh) Bridge				55°31′49″N 2°54′17″W	Category B	13866	Upload another image
Broadmeadows Bridge, Near Bowhill North Lodge				55°33′36″N 2°55′53″W	Category C(S)	13868	Upload Photo
100, 102 And 104 Ettrick Terrace Including Railings And Boundary Walls				55°33′17″N 2°50′12″W	Category C(S)	49846	Upload Photo
94 (Part) - 110 (Even Nos) Forest Road, And 52 And 54 (Part) Mill Street				55°32′55″N 2°50′46″W	Category C(S)	43754	Upload Photo
13 High Street				55°32′52″N 2°50′28″W	Category C(S)	43761	Upload Photo
23, 25 And 27 High Street				55°32′52″N 2°50′27″W	Category C(S)	43763	Upload Photo
69 And 71 High Street				55°32′54″N 2°49′55″W	Category C(S)	43772	Upload Photo
16 And 18 High Street				55°32′52″N 2°50′26″W	Category C(S)	43779	Upload Photo
32 High Street				55°32′53″N 2°50′24″W	Category C(S)	43781	Upload Photo
62-70 (Even Nos) High Street				55°32′54″N 2°50′22″W	Category C(S)	43785	Upload Photo
High Street, Selkirk Parish Church (Church Of Scotland), Former Lawson Memorial Church With Boundary Walls, Gatepiers And Railings				55°32′56″N 2°50′16″W	Category B	43787	Upload another image
3 And Market Place				55°32′50″N 2°50′33″W	Category C(S)	43792	Upload Photo
20 Market Place				55°32′50″N 2°50′28″W	Category C(S)	43799	Upload Photo
66-74 (Even Nos) Mill Street				55°32′57″N 2°50′45″W	Category C(S)	43807	Upload Photo
Old Bridge Road, Bridge Park				55°33′02″N 2°50′33″W	Category C(S)	43808	Upload Photo
Scotts Place, Selkirk Congregational Church With Boundary Walls, Railings And Gatepiers				55°33′00″N 2°50′14″W	Category C(S)	43814	Upload Photo
14 Shawpark Road, Dandswall Lodge, Stable And Coach Block With Court, Gatepiers And Railings				55°33′08″N 2°49′54″W	Category B	43817	Upload Photo
6, 8 And 10 Viewfield Lane, Elm Park				55°33′04″N 2°50′23″W	Category B	43828	Upload Photo
19 And 21 West Port				55°32′48″N 2°50′34″W	Category B	43831	Upload Photo
12-18 (Even Nos) West Port				55°32′49″N 2°50′34″W	Category C(S)	43840	Upload Photo
Yarrow Terrace, Heatherlie Manse With Boundary Wall And Gatepiers				55°32′51″N 2°51′05″W	Category B	43842	Upload Photo
Kirk Wynd, Auld Kirkyard, Old Parish Kirk, Boundary Wall, Railings, Gates And Gateway				55°32′47″N 2°50′29″W	Category B	40567	Upload another image
Scotts Place, Flodden Monument, "Fletcher"				55°32′58″N 2°50′17″W	Category B	40574	Upload Photo
Dunsdale Road, Ettrick Mill				55°33′16″N 2°50′21″W	Category A	40578	Upload another image
High Sunderland, The Studio (Former Bernat Klein Studio)				55°34′24″N 2°50′10″W	Category A	19484	Upload another image See more images
The Haining, Including Railed Screen Wall And Terrace Statues				55°32′35″N 2°50′35″W	Category A	15190	Upload Photo
Sunderland Hall Including Terraced Gardens				55°34′39″N 2°49′29″W	Category B	15201	Upload Photo
Philiphaugh Estate Sawmill				55°32′24″N 2°52′19″W	Category B	15203	Upload Photo
Philiphaugh Policies, West Lodge Including Boundary Walls And Gatepiers				55°32′37″N 2°53′58″W	Category C(S)	49227	Upload Photo
Ettrick Terrace, Greenbank With Boundary Walls, Gig House And Wall-Mounted Letter-Box				55°33′02″N 2°50′31″W	Category B	43749	Upload Photo
19 Heatherlie Park With Gate, Gatepiers, Boundary Walls And Outbuildings				55°32′49″N 2°50′59″W	Category C(S)	43757	Upload Photo
High School Lane, Old High School With Boundary Walls, Gatepiers And Outbuildings				55°32′55″N 2°49′55″W	Category C(S)	43759	Upload Photo
51 And 53 High Street				55°32′53″N 2°50′26″W	Category C(S)	43770	Upload Photo
105 High Street, Church Of Our Lady And St Joseph (Roman Catholic) And Boundary Walls				55°32′56″N 2°50′24″W	Category C(S)	43775	Upload Photo
28 And 30 High Street				55°32′52″N 2°50′25″W	Category C(S)	43780	Upload Photo
28 Hillside Terrace, Rosemount And Boundary Walls				55°32′53″N 2°50′03″W	Category C(S)	43788	Upload Photo
2 And 4 Market Place				55°32′49″N 2°50′33″W	Category C(S)	43791	Upload Photo
6 Market Place, Bank Of Scotland, With Railings				55°32′50″N 2°50′32″W	Category B	43793	Upload another image
21 Tower Street				55°32′52″N 2°50′23″W	Category C(S)	43823	Upload Photo
4 Viewfield Lane, Elm Park Lodge With Boundary Walls, Gatepiers And Court				55°33′01″N 2°50′22″W	Category B	43827	Upload Photo
1-7 (Odd Nos) West Port				55°32′48″N 2°50′33″W	Category C(S)	43829	Upload Photo
Back Row, Former Masonic Hall				55°32′52″N 2°50′19″W	Category C(S)	43742	Upload Photo
Ettrick Road, Forest Lodge With Boundary Wall				55°32′45″N 2°51′03″W	Category C(S)	43745	Upload Photo
Market Place, Town House, Old Sheriff Court And Boundary Walls				55°32′50″N 2°50′28″W	Category A	40569	Upload another image
Market Place, Sir Walter Scott Memorial				55°32′50″N 2°50′30″W	Category B	40571	Upload Photo
High Street And Back Row, Mungo Park (Monument)				55°32′55″N 2°50′21″W	Category B	40573	Upload another image
Fauldshope Bridge				55°31′05″N 2°55′30″W	Category C(S)	15194	Upload Photo
Bowhill				55°32′26″N 2°54′41″W	Category A	15196	Upload Photo
General's Bridge				55°32′36″N 2°54′02″W	Category C(S)	13854	Upload Photo
Bowhill Policies, Icehouse				55°32′28″N 2°54′14″W	Category C(S)	13867	Upload Photo
Ettrick Terrace, Former Jail, Now Incorporating Public Library, Boundary Walls And Entrance Arch With 1 Chapel Street And Screen Wall				55°32′54″N 2°50′32″W	Category B	43752	Upload Photo
Hallidays Park, Old Manse With Boundary Walls				55°32′56″N 2°50′28″W	Category C(S)	43755	Upload Photo
41-49 (Odd Nos) High Street				55°32′53″N 2°50′26″W	Category C(S)	43769	Upload Photo
38 And 39 Market Place And Halliwell's Close				55°32′48″N 2°50′30″W	Category B	43802	Upload Photo
Station Road, Station Hotel And Gatepiers				55°32′59″N 2°50′49″W	Category C(S)	43820	Upload Photo
Viewfield Lodge With Gatepiers And Railings				55°32′59″N 2°50′18″W	Category C(S)	43826	Upload Photo
22-26 (Even Nos) West Port				55°32′48″N 2°50′35″W	Category C(S)	43841	Upload Photo
Yarrow Terrace, Glen Hotel, With Boundary Walls And Gatepiers				55°32′48″N 2°51′09″W	Category B	43844	Upload Photo
1 Market Place, Town Arms Inn				55°32′49″N 2°50′33″W	Category B	43277	Upload another image
Dunsdale Road, Riverside Or Dunsdale Mill				55°33′25″N 2°50′10″W	Category B	40577	Upload Photo
The Stables, Haining				55°32′35″N 2°50′40″W	Category A	15191	Upload another image
The Haining, Deer Larder				55°32′35″N 2°50′38″W	Category C(S)	15192	Upload Photo
1 - 14 (Even Nos) Heatherlie Terrace				55°32′51″N 2°50′52″W	Category C(S)	43758	Upload Photo
1 High Street				55°32′51″N 2°50′29″W	Category C(S)	43760	Upload Photo
32 Hillside Terrace With Boundary Wall And Gatepiers				55°32′52″N 2°50′02″W	Category C(S)	43789	Upload Photo
11 And 12 Market Place				55°32′51″N 2°50′30″W	Category C(S)	43796	Upload Photo
47 And 48 Market Place				55°32′48″N 2°50′32″W	Category C(S)	43804	Upload Photo
6 Russell Place, The Floors With Boundary Wall, Railings And Gatepiers				55°32′50″N 2°50′03″W	Category C(S)	43809	Upload Photo
9, 10 And 11 Thornfield Avenue, Thornfield House				55°33′07″N 2°50′17″W	Category B	43822	Upload Photo
39 West Port				55°32′47″N 2°50′36″W	Category C(S)	43836	Upload Photo
Back Row, Drill Hall And Boundary Wall				55°32′52″N 2°50′18″W	Category C(S)	43741	Upload Photo
33 Market Place				55°32′49″N 2°50′29″W	Category B	40570	Upload Photo
Sunderland Hall				55°34′39″N 2°49′32″W	Category B	15200	Upload Photo
106 Ettrick Terrace Including Outbuildings And Wall Letter Box				55°33′18″N 2°50′11″W	Category C(S)	49847	Upload Photo
108 And 110 Ettrick Terrace				55°33′18″N 2°50′11″W	Category C(S)	49848	Upload Photo

== Key ==
The scheme for classifying buildings in Scotland is:

- Category A: "buildings of national or international importance, either architectural or historic; or fine, little-altered examples of some particular period, style or building type."
- Category B: "buildings of regional or more than local importance; or major examples of some particular period, style or building type, which may have been altered."
- Category C: "buildings of local importance; lesser examples of any period, style, or building type, as originally constructed or moderately altered; and simple traditional buildings which group well with other listed buildings."

In March 2016 there were 47,288 listed buildings in Scotland. Of these, 8% were Category A, and 50% were Category B, with the remaining 42% being Category C.
