= County Buildings, Selkirk =

Courthouse in Duns, Scotland

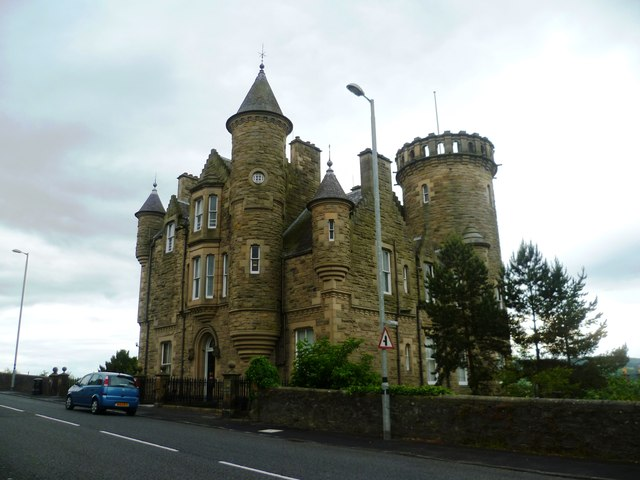
- County Buildings, Selkirk

- Shown in Scottish Borders
- 55.5484°N 2.8429°W
- Location: Ettrick Terrace, Selkirk

History
- Built: 1870

Site notes
- Architect: David Rhind
- Architectural style: Scottish baronial style

Listed Building – Category B
- Official name: Selkirk Sheriff Court and Justice of The Peace Court, including gatepiers, railings and boundary walls, Ettrick Terrace, Selkirk
- Designated: 11 December 1996
- Reference no.: LB43747

County Buildings is a municipal structure in Ettrick Terrace, Selkirk, Scottish Borders, Scotland. The complex, which was the headquarters of Selkirkshire County Council and was also used as a courthouse, is a Category B listed building.

== History ==
The first judicial building in the town was a tolbooth in the Market Place, which dated back at least to the early 16th century. The prison cells in the building were improved at the expense of James Hamilton, 5th Duke of Hamilton, in 1742 and a steeple was added at the east end of the structure in 1746. The sheriff-depute, Walter Scott, complained about the dilapidated state of the building in 1801 and burgh leaders agreed that it should be demolished. Court hearings were then held in the Town House, which was completed in 1805.

In the 1860s, it was decided that there should be a dedicated sheriff court and meeting place for the Commissioners of Supply. The new building was designed by David Rhind in the Scottish baronial style, built in ashlar stone at a cost of £10,152 and was completed in 1870. The design involved an asymmetrical main frontage of three bays facing onto Ettrick Terrace. The central bay featured a round-headed doorway with a fanlight and a hood mould on the ground floor, oriel windows on the first and second floors and a stepped gable above. The left-hand bay was fenestrated by a sash window and by a smaller window with a gablet on the second floor. The right-hand bay, which was recessed and single storey, was fenestrated by a single sash window on the ground floor. There were bartizans at the left and right hand corners and a corbeled turret to the right of the centre bay. Internally, the principal room was the courtroom on the first floor.

Following the implementation of the Local Government (Scotland) Act 1889, which established county councils in every county, the new county leaders needed to identify a meeting place for Selkirkshire County Council and duly arranged to meet in the courthouse. The council's staff were based at the Bank of Scotland Buildings in the Market Place in Selkirk.

After the abolition of Selkirkshire County Council in 1975, the building continued to serve a judicial function, being used for hearings of the sheriff's court and, on one day a month, for hearings of the justice of the peace court. The building was threatened with closure in 2015 but retention was recommended.

== See also ==
- List of listed buildings in Selkirk, Scottish Borders
