= Selkirk Town House =

Municipal building in Selkirk, Scotland

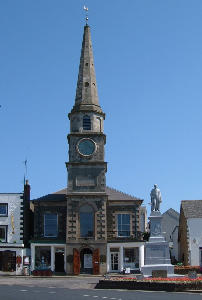
- Selkirk Town House

- Shown in the Scottish Borders
- 55.5471°N 2.8413°W
- Location: Market Place, Selkirk

History
- Built: 1805

Site notes
- Architect: Robert Lees
- Architectural style: Neoclassical style

Listed Building – Category A
- Official name: Town House, Market Place, Selkirk
- Designated: 12 March 1971
- Reference no.: LB40569

Selkirk Town House is a municipal building in the Market Place, Selkirk, Scottish Borders, Scotland. The structure, which is used as a local history museum is a Category A listed building.

== History ==
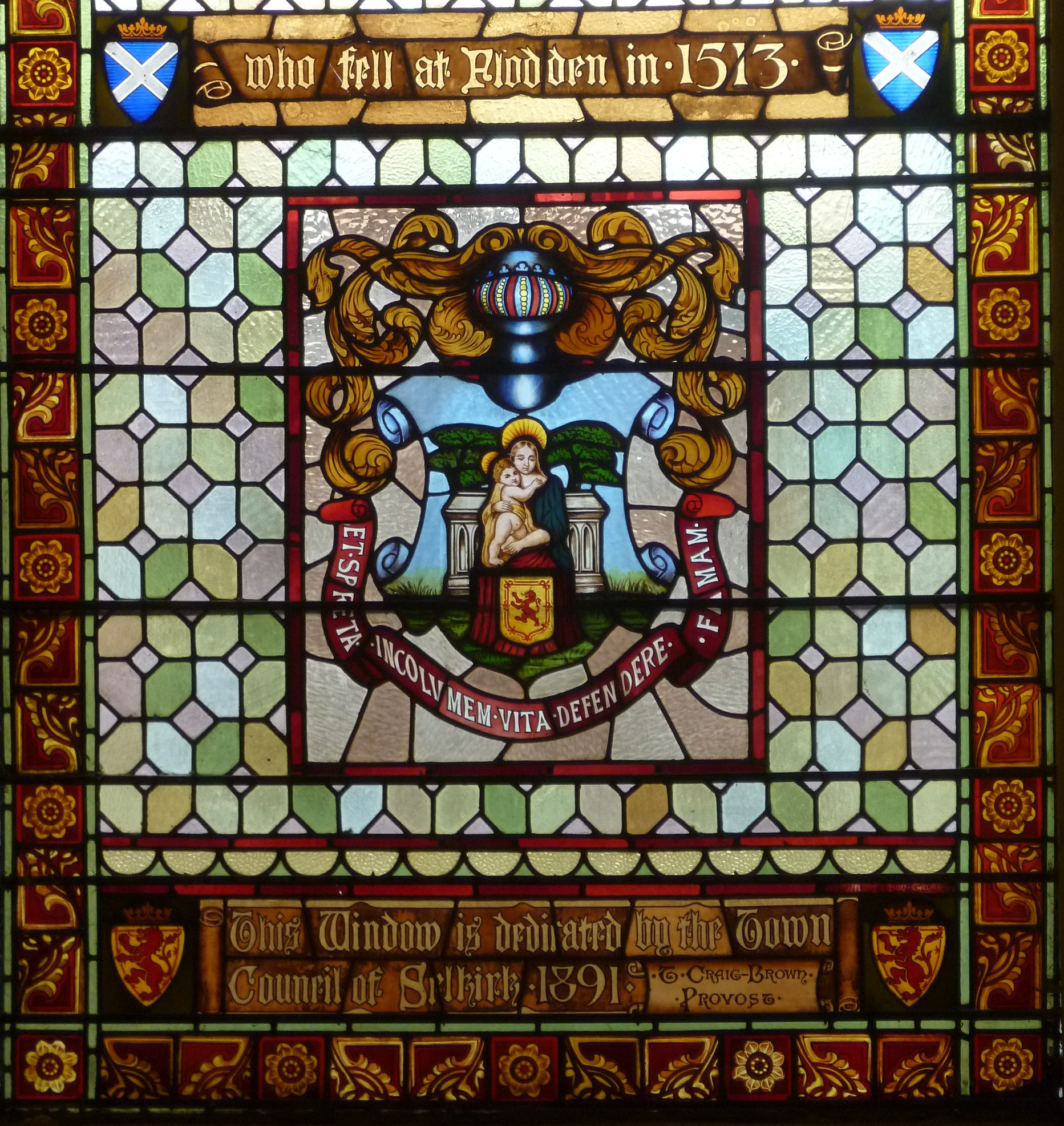
Stained-glass window commemorating the Battle of Flodden

The first municipal building in the town was a tolbooth in the Market Place which dated back at least to the early 16th century. The prison cells in the building were improved at the expense of James Hamilton, 5th Duke of Hamilton, in 1742 and a steeple was added at the east end of the structure in 1746. The sheriff-depute, Walter Scott, complained about the dilapidated state of the building in 1801 and burgh leaders agreed that it should be demolished. Work started on a new town house, located just to the west of the old tolbooth, in 1803. It was designed by Robert Lees of Dalkeith in the neoclassical style, built in coursed rubble and ashlar stone and was completed in 1805.

The design involved a symmetrical main frontage with three bays facing onto the Market Square; the central bay, which was slightly projected forward, was formed by a five-stage clock tower with heavy cornices separating each of the stages above the first. The clock tower featured a round headed doorway in the first stage, a round headed alcove containing a square headed window in the second stage, a blind panel in the third stage, a set of clock faces in the fourth stage and an octagonal belfry in the fifth stage. The bell, which had been cast by Lester & Pack in 1757, was recovered from the old tolbooth and the clock tower was surmounted by a spire, which was 100 feet (30 m) high. The outer bays were originally fenestrated by round headed windows on the ground floor and by square headed windows on the first floor. Internally, the principal room was the courtroom on the first floor.

Scott continued to preside in the courtroom until his death in 1832, and hearings were relocated to a new courthouse in Ettrick Terrace in 1870. In 1891, a stained-glass window was installed on the first floor to commemorate the lives of local people who had died at the Battle of Flodden during the War of the League of Cambrai.

The town clerk and other council officers relocated to a former private house, previously known as "Dovecote", further northeast along the High Street, in 1904. A plaque, intended to commemorate Scott's role sheriff-depute, was placed on the right of the doorway; a second plaque, intended to commemorate the granting of the town charter by King James V in 1535, was placed on the left of the doorway and unveiled by Charles Douglas-Home, 13th Earl of Home in June 1935.

The building continued to serve as the meeting place of the burgh council for much of the 20th century but ceased to be the local seat of government when the enlarged Ettrick and Lauderdale District Council was formed in 1975. A small museum was subsequently established in the building with support from Borders Regional Council: it largely exhibited artefacts associated with the novelist, Sir Walter Scott, the poet, James Hogg, and the explorer, Mungo Park. An extensive programme of refurbishment works, financed by Historic Environment Scotland and the Scottish Borders Council and costing £430,000, was completed in December 2018.

== See also ==
- List of listed buildings in Selkirk, Scottish Borders
- List of Category A listed buildings in the Scottish Borders
