= Buxley =

Hamlet in Scottish Borders, Scotland

Coordinates: 55.7861°N 2.3061°W

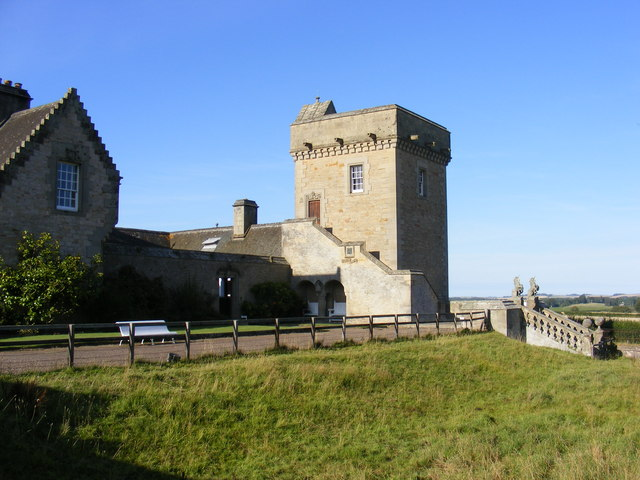
- The Dairy Tower at Buxley

- Location within the Scottish Borders
- OS grid reference: NT8054
- Council area: Scottish Borders
- Lieutenancy area: Berwickshire
- Country: Scotland
- Sovereign state: United Kingdom
- Police: Scotland
- Fire: Scottish
- Ambulance: Scottish

Buxley is a hamlet in the Scottish Borders area of Scotland. It is adjacent to Manderston House, 2.5 kilometres (1.6 mi) east of Duns, Scottish Borders. Buxley is the home farm and estate offices of Manderston, and comprises cottages, offices, a dairy and other farm buildings, as well as an engine house and a fire station. Most of the buildings were constructed between 1897 and 1900, to designs by the architect John Kinross for the then owner of Manderston, Sir James Miller, 2nd Baronet. The Dairy Court, Dairy Tower, Engineer's House, Fire Station and Engine House, and Head Gardener's House are protected as category A listed buildings, while several other buildings are listed as category B.

== See also ==
- List of places in the Scottish Borders
