= William Mylne =

Scottish architect and engineer

William Mylne (1734–1790) was a Scottish architect and engineer. He is best known as the builder of the North Bridge, which links the Old and New Towns of Edinburgh, Scotland. He was the younger brother of Robert Mylne, architect and designer of Blackfriars Bridge in London.

== Early life ==
William was descended from the Mylne family of stonemasons and architects. He was the second son of Thomas Mylne, Deacon of the mason's guild, who built the original Edinburgh Royal Infirmary to designs by William Adam. Like his elder brother Robert, William attended the Royal High School. He then served time as an apprentice stonemason.

== Grand tour ==
In autumn 1753 he left Edinburgh for Paris, where he studied at the École des Arts under the architect Jacques-François Blondel. As well as part-time study, he also undertook paid work, learning the art of marble carving, to supplement the minimal allowance from his father. The following year, at the suggestion of James Nevay, a fellow Scot in France, Mylne proposed to his father that he be allowed to go on to Rome to study architecture, with a view to eventually setting up practice in London. The result was that his elder brother Robert joined him in Paris, and they travelled to Rome together. Robert had recently completed his apprenticeship and was preparing to take over the family business. He arrived in France by the end of November 1754, and the brothers set off a few days later. Travelling mostly by foot, due to lack of funds, they visited Avignon and Marseille, where they took a boat to Civitavecchia, and arrived at Rome in early 1755.

The brothers lodged on the Via del Condotti, although they were continually short of funds. They encountered Robert Adam, a fellow Scot also studying architecture, although Adam was disdainful of the Mylnes' poor situation; the Mylnes had a joint allowance of just £45 a year, compared to Adam's annual expenditure of around £800. They visited Naples in May 1756, but William was planning to leave by September, on account of his dislike of the hot weather. Leaving Robert at Rome the following spring, William travelled north, spending several months visiting Pisa, Florence, and Venice. Here he met Robert Adam again, also travelling home, although the latter did not offer him a lift in his coach. William also visited several of Palladio's villas in the area, making measured drawings and sketches.

His journey home during the winter of 1757-1758 was fraught with difficulty due to the weather, politics, and his own finances. The Seven Years' War had broken out between England and France, and their respective allies, forcing a journey through Germany. Mylne was obliged to burn all his papers to hide his British identity, and posed as an Italian to avoid being either arrested or pressed into military service. He travelled across the Alps by sledge, and through Germany by post coach, as the rivers were frozen and boat travel was impossible. He arrived in Rotterdam in February, suffering from cold and hunger. He described the experience, in a letter to Robert, as "one continuous ague of fears and fatigues".

== Edinburgh ==
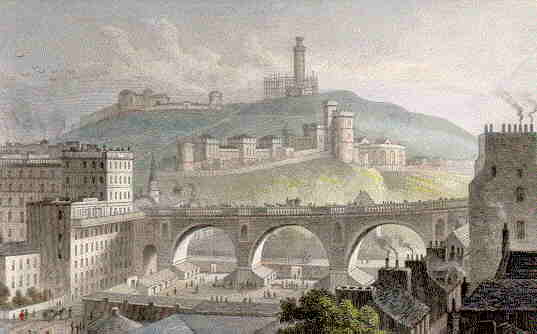
Mylne's North Bridge, with Calton Hill in the background, in 1829

William returned to his home city, where he established himself as a mason and architect in the family tradition. By 1758 he was a member of the Incorporation of St Mary's Chapel, the guild of masons and carpenters in Edinburgh, and began to take on the running of his father's business. He lived at the family home in Halkerston's Wynd, off the Royal Mile, initially with his older sister Elizabeth as housekeeper, until she eloped in 1758, and then with his younger sister Anne.

He was appointed Surveyor to the city in 1759. In 1759, he designed the Yair Bridge, over the River Tweed at Fairnilee, which he built between 1760 and 1764, and which still stands. Between 1768 and 1772, William and Robert were jointly responsible for designing and supervising construction, of the New Bridge over the River Clyde in Glasgow. This bridge, carrying Jamaica Street, was replaced by a larger structure in 1836.

In February 1763 Thomas Mylne died. Robert by this time was an established architect and engineer in London, and had won the competition to build a new bridge at Blackfriars. William therefore took on the family business, while Robert inherited the family's mansion at Powderhall, where their mother continued to live.

In 1765, Mylne submitted his plans for a new bridge to link Edinburgh's Old Town with the area to the north, which was to become the New Town. The bridge was the subject of a competition, and other designs were prepared by James Craig and David Henderson. Mylne's design was selected, and he was contracted to build the bridge, for £10,140, within four years. The North Bridge comprised three stone arches and was 1,134 feet (346 m) long, and 70 feet (21 m) high, although much of the length was solid abutment. Robert Mylne acted as financial surety to the scheme. By the summer of 1769 the bridge was approaching completion, and although not officially open, was regularly used by pedestrians. However, on 3 August, one of the arches collapsed, causing the deaths of five people. Poor foundations, resting on accumulated rubbish at the bottom of the valley, were blamed. Robert came up from London to offer his assistance, and the Town Council commissioned a report on the collapse from John Smeaton and John Adam. William's payments were stopped until the matter was resolved. William repaired the damage, and completed the bridge in 1772, but the collapse led him into financial difficulties.

== America ==
His financial problems aggravated William's poor health and sensitive nature. In May 1773 he fled Edinburgh, arriving in London three months later. Avoiding his brother, he sailed for America, with the aim of establishing himself anew. Once there, he corresponded regularly with his sister in Edinburgh and brother in London. He initially travelled to South Carolina, setting himself up as a planter. In 1774 he moved to New York, and once again tried to make his way as an architect, but was not successful, and Mylne decided to return to Britain.

== Dublin ==
On his return from America, Robert assisted him in obtaining the job of running the Dublin Water Works. He held this post until his death, improving and enlarging the water supply system. The Lord Mayor presented him with a silver plate in 1786, with an inscription praising his contribution to the city. William Mylne died in March 1790, at the age of 56. Robert Mylne erected a plaque in St. Catherine's Church, Dublin, "to inform Posterity of the uncommon Zeal, Integrity and Skill with which he formed, enlarged, and established on a perfect system, the Water Works of Dublin."

== Family ==
William Mylne never married, although he fathered a son, Willy, around 1770. Willy was raised in the Mylne household, and William paid for his education at the Royal High School.

== Bibliography ==
- Colvin, Howard (1995) A Biographical Dictionary of British Architects, 1600-1840 3rd edition. Yale University Press. ISBN 0-300-06091-2
- Ward, Robert (2007) The Man Who Buried Nelson: The Surprising Life of Robert Mylne. Tempus. ISBN 978-0-7524-3922-8
