= Longformacus House =

Scottish mansion house

Coordinates: 55°48′29″N 2°29′13″W

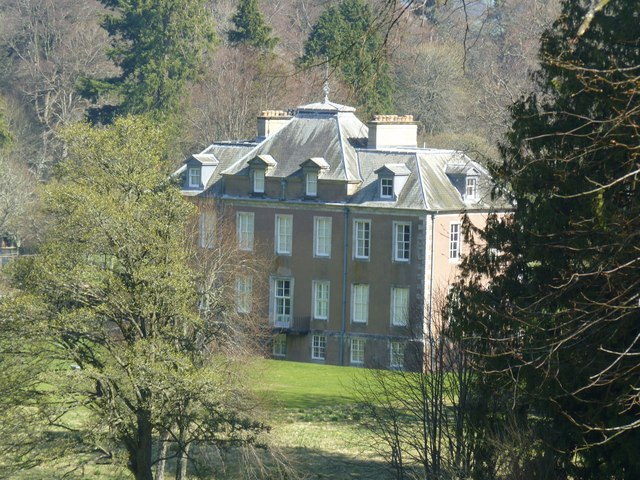
Longformacus House

Longformacus House is a mansion near the village of Longformacus, Scottish Borders, Scotland.

== History ==
The estate was once owned by the Earls of Moray and then the Earls of Dunbar before passing to the Sinclair family. A castle may have existed at the site prior to the current mansion house.

Robert Sinclair of Longformacus built the current mansion house in the early 18th century. A plaque shows the inscription "Adam delin" by the Scottish architect William Adam.
