= Yair, Scottish Borders =

Estate in the Scottish Borders

Yair House
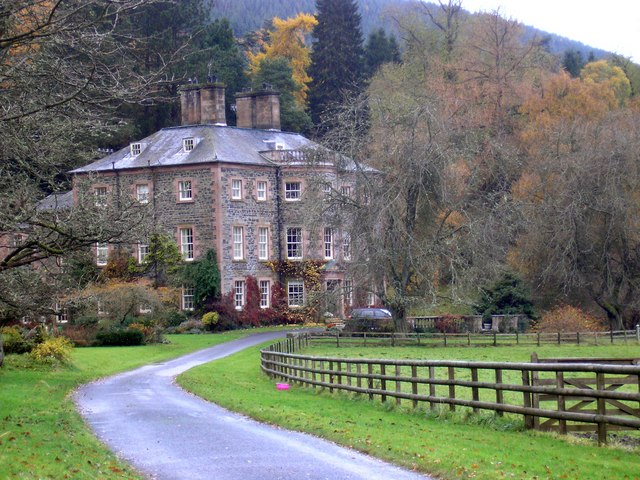
- Yair House

- Location in the Scottish Borders
- 55.586°N 2.8695°W

Listed Building – Category A
- Designated: 12 March 1971
- Reference no.: LB1899

Yair, also known as The Yair, is an estate in the Scottish Borders. It stands by the River Tweed in the former county of Selkirkshire, 2.5 miles (4.0 km) north-west of Selkirk, and 28 miles (45 km) south of Edinburgh. The name comes from the old Scots word for a fish trap. The estate is centred on Yair House, which is protected as a category A listed building. The nearby Yair Bridge is also category A listed.

== History ==
In 1156 King Malcolm allowed the monks of Kelso to build a dam on the River Tweed, creating a pool for fishing.

Yair House was built by Alexander Pringle of Whytbank (1747–1827) in 1788. It is a Georgian house of three storeys, with a large bay to the front. Pringle made his fortune in India, and re-purchased the family estates on his return. These estates, which included Whytbank Tower on the north side of the river, had been Pringle property since the 16th century, but were sold in the early 18th century to pay debts. The designer of the new house was William Elliot, a Kelso-based architect who designed The Haining in Selkirk, for another Pringle, in 1794.

The house was the home to Sir Kenneth and Lady Louisa Mary Anderson. Louisa's companion in later life was the Australian Phoebe Wesche and she gifted Caddonfoot Hall to the local community in 1929.

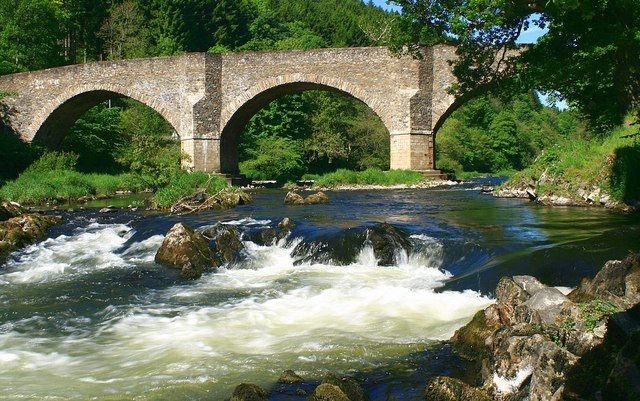
Yair Bridge

Yair Bridge lies 600 metres (2,000 ft) downstream from the house. It was constructed around 1764, and designed by the Edinburgh architect William Mylne (1734–1790). The three-arch stone bridge now carries the A707 across the Tweed.

== Outdoor access ==
Yair Hill Forest is one of many forests in the Borders managed by Forestry and Land Scotland (FLS). It is located to the south and west of the house on Craig Hill (382m) and on Three Brethren (484m). Three Brethren is named after three stone mounds built in the 16th century by the lairds of Yair, Philiphaugh and Selkirk, to mark the boundaries of their lands. Access to the forest is at Lindinney car park on the A707, close to Yair Bridge. The Yair Grazings car park, at the north-west edge of the forest, allows access to Yair Wood, and nearby Glenkinnon car park is the access point for a biodiversity trail. Part of the forest is Lindinny Community Woodland, which is being restored from coniferous to native woodland by FCS and the Borders Forest Trust.

The Southern Upland Way passes through the estate, descending from Three Brethren and crossing Yair Bridge. The Sir Walter Scott Way follows the same route. Below Yair is the Fairnilee slalom site on the River Tweed, used for canoe slalom. The Yair and the River Tweed generally remain popular salmon fishing sites. Yair House is not open to the public, though the gardens are occasionally opened for charity as part of Scotland's Gardens Scheme.

== See also ==
- List of places in the Scottish Borders
- List of places in Scotland
- Clan Pringle
