= Manderston =

British stately home in Duns, Berwickshire

Coordinates: 55.7816°N 2.3045°W

Designations

Inventory of Gardens and Designed Landscapes in Scotland
- Official name: Manderston
- Designated: 30 June 1987
- Reference no.: GDL00273

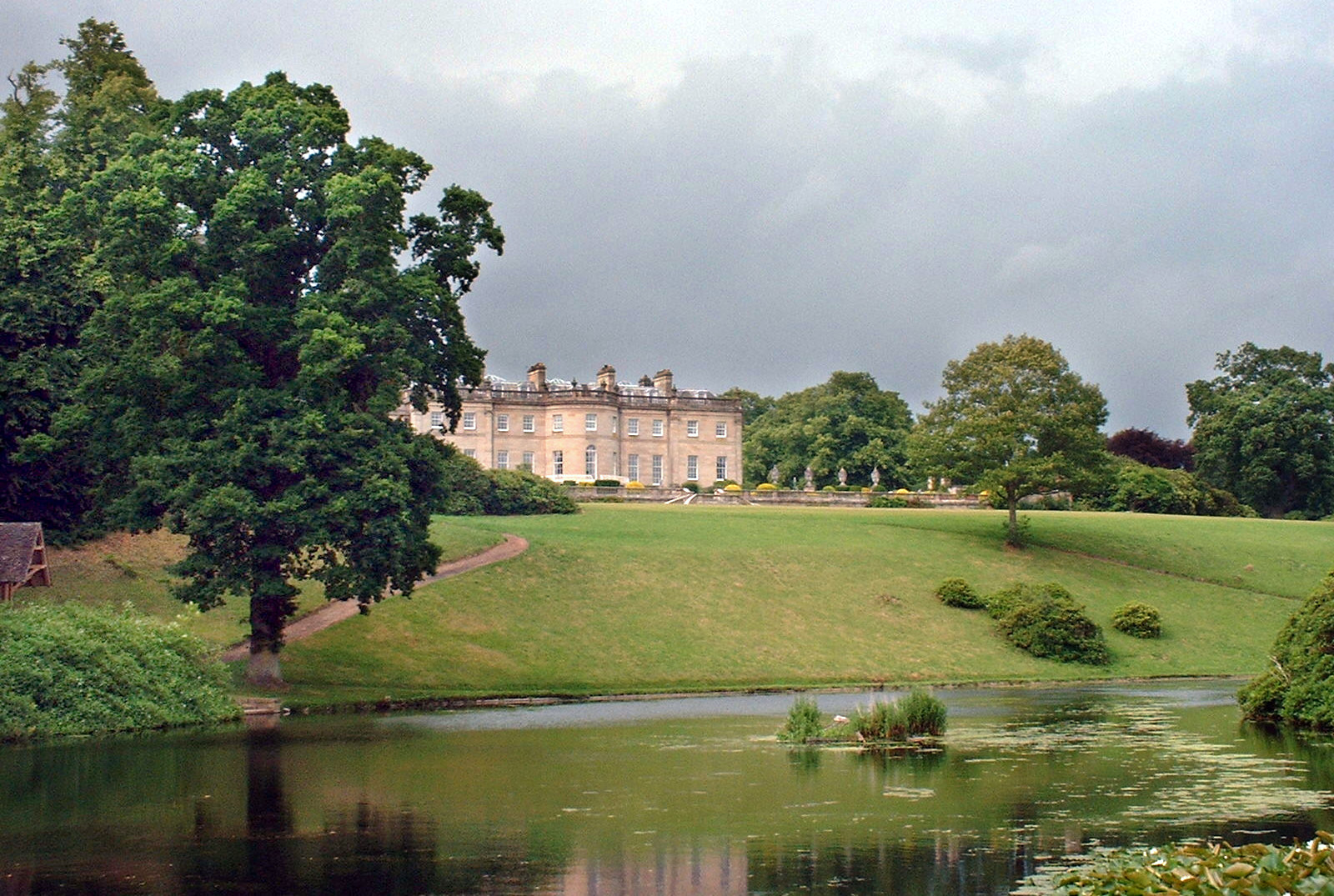
Manderston - viewed across the lake

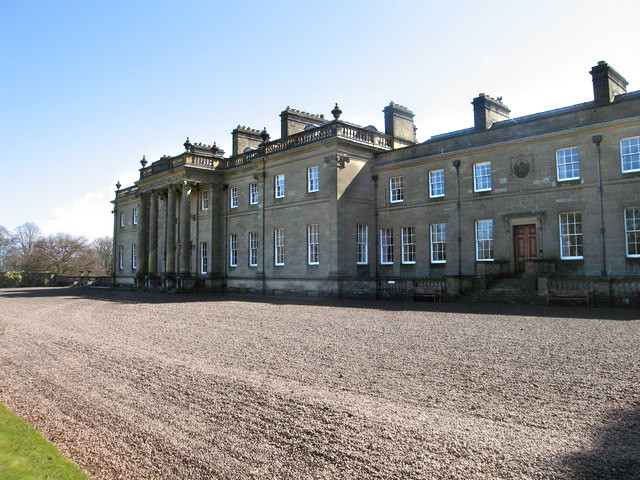
The main facade

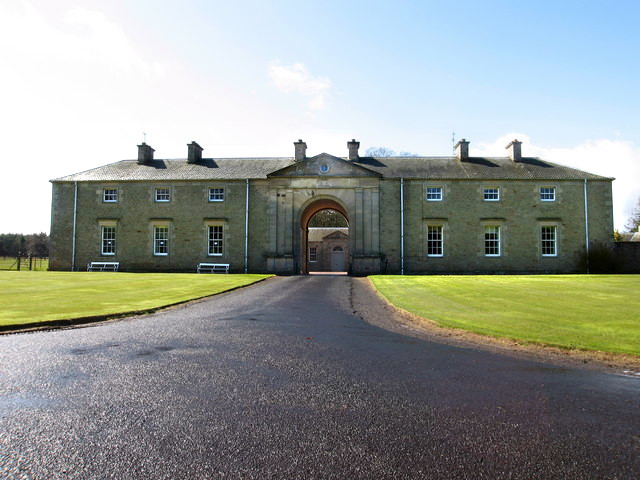
The stable block

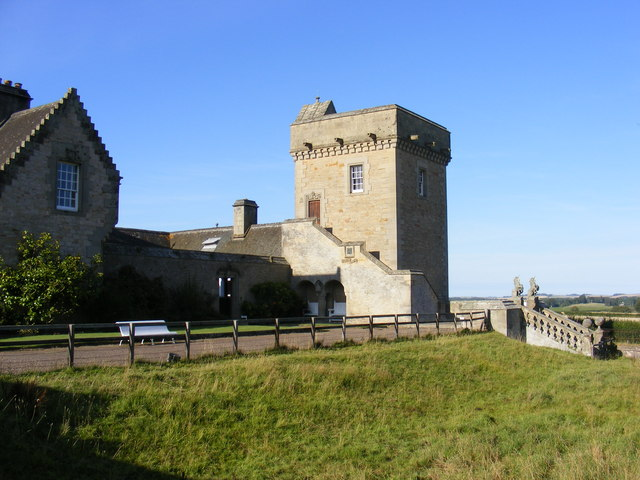
The Tower House and dairy

Manderston House is a British stately home in Duns, Berwickshire. It is the seat of the Palmer family. It was completely rebuilt between 1901 and 1903 and has sumptuous interiors with a silver-plated staircase. The proprietor, Sir James Miller, 2nd Baronet (1864–1906), told the architect, John Kinross, that there was no budget: "It doesn't matter". The house is a Category A listed building and the surrounding area, which includes the farm complex at Buxley, is listed in the Inventory of Gardens and Designed Landscapes in Scotland.

== Origins ==
Manderston was an estate of the powerful Hume family, and their tower house appears on General Roy's map of 1750. Alexander Hume, of Manderston, de jure 5th Earl of Dunbar (1651–1720), owned the estate, but a later member of the family was Sir James Home of Manderston Bt., who witnessed a deed in 1769. On 14 October 1689, King William III & II confirmed the Earldom of Dunbar to him, exemplifying the previous confirmation thereof by King Charles II. The estate was later owned for a short time by the head of the Swinton family, who now resides at Kimmerghame House nearby, and from whom the actress Tilda Swinton is descended. The present big house at Manderston incorporates the earlier Georgian house built about 1790 for Dalhousie Watherston (1752–1803).

== Buildings ==
The original c. 1790 house underwent alterations in 1870 and was then extensively remodelled by John Kinross at the start of the 20th century. It is one of several Category A listed buildings in the estate along with the stables, a boat house and a gamekeeper's cottage; all of which were built by Kinross. Kinross was also responsible for the group of buildings at Buxley at the north of the estate.

Near to the house is a Category C listed cricket pavilion. Manderston cricket club was founded in 1899 and is one of the oldest in Scotland. The pavilion, built c.1900, was renovated in 1999 as part of the club's centenary celebrations following a successful Heritage Lottery Funding bid.

== Family ==
Sir James Miller's father, Sir William Miller, 1st Baronet (1809–1887), had, with his father James, made a fortune trading in Russia, mainly in herring and hemp. He was British Vice-Consul at St. Petersburg (1842–1854), Member of Parliament for Leith (1859–1868), and Berwickshire (1873–1874).

Sir James Miller, 2nd Baronet, had married Eveline, daughter of Alfred, 4th Baron Scarsdale, and his grand house remodelling scheme was said to be to remind his wife of the splendour of her family home, Kedleston Hall. They had no children and the estate passed to his brother John Alexander Miller, 3rd Baronet, (1867–1918). He also had no children by either of his two wives, and the estate passed to his sister Amy Elizabeth Miller, the 4th Lord Palmer's great-grandmother.

The house contains the world's largest collection of Huntley & Palmers biscuit tins, dating back to 1868. It is open to the public on selected days only.

== Films ==
The house has been used in several film and television productions:

- The House of Mirth (2000 film)
- The Edwardian Country House (Channel 4, 2002; shown as Manor House on PBS in the U.S., 2003)
- Man to Man
- First Night (2010, Scorpio Films)
- The Awakening (2011, BBC Films)
- Secrets of the Manor House (2012, PBS)

== See also ==
- Buxley
- List of places in the Scottish Borders
- List of places in Scotland
