= Ashiestiel =

Village in Scottish Borders, Scotland

Coordinates: 55.60°N 02.92°W

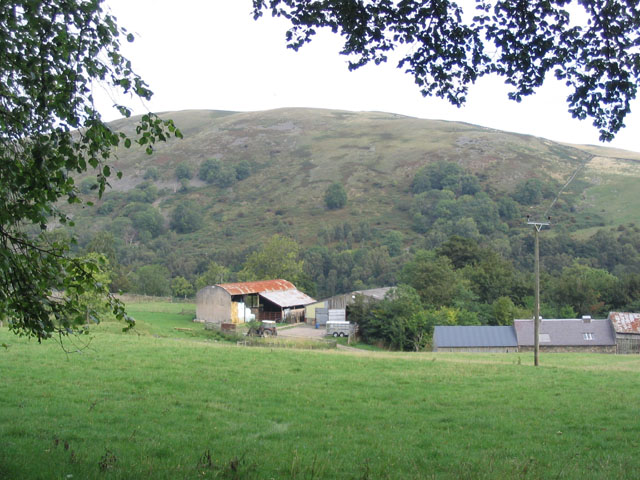
- Ashiestiel Farm

- Location within the Scottish Borders
- OS grid reference: NT426355
- Council area: Scottish Borders
- Country: Scotland
- Sovereign state: United Kingdom
- Police: Scotland
- Fire: Scottish
- Ambulance: Scottish
- UK Parliament: Berwickshire, Roxburgh and Selkirk
- Scottish Parliament: Midlothian South, Tweeddale and Lauderdale

Ashiestiel is a village in the Scottish Borders area of Scotland, in the Parish of Caddonfoot, on the south side of the River Tweed, 4m (6.5 km) east of Innerleithen.

The original name of this village in the Royal Ettrick Forest was "Echesteile" in 1456. Ashiestiel House was the home of Sir Walter Scott from 1804 until he moved to Abbotsford House in 1812.

Ashiestiel Hill rises to 402 m (1319 ft).

== See also ==
- List of places in the Scottish Borders
- List of places in East Lothian
