= John Kinross =

Scottish architect

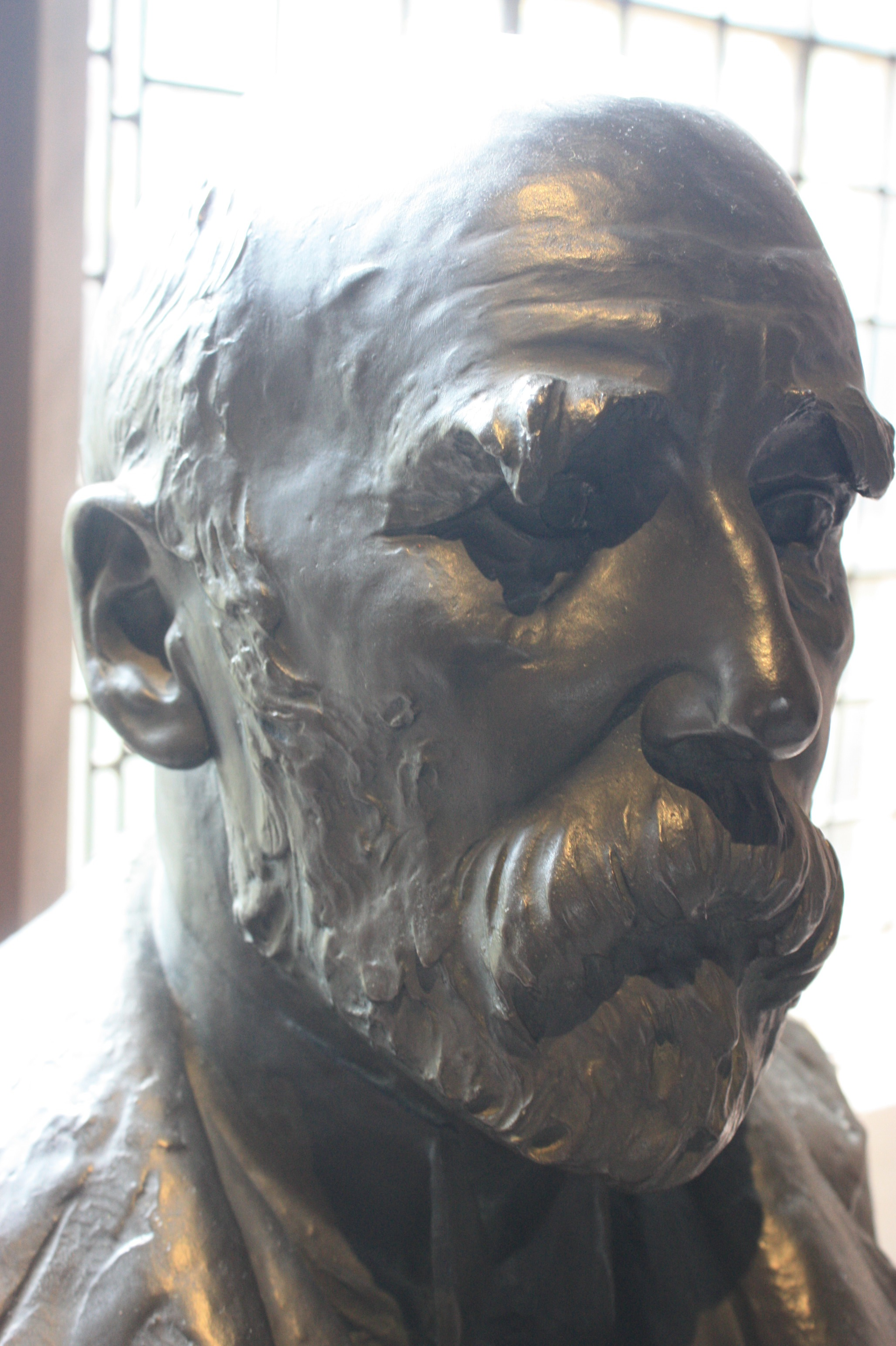
John Kinross by William Birnie Rhind 1922

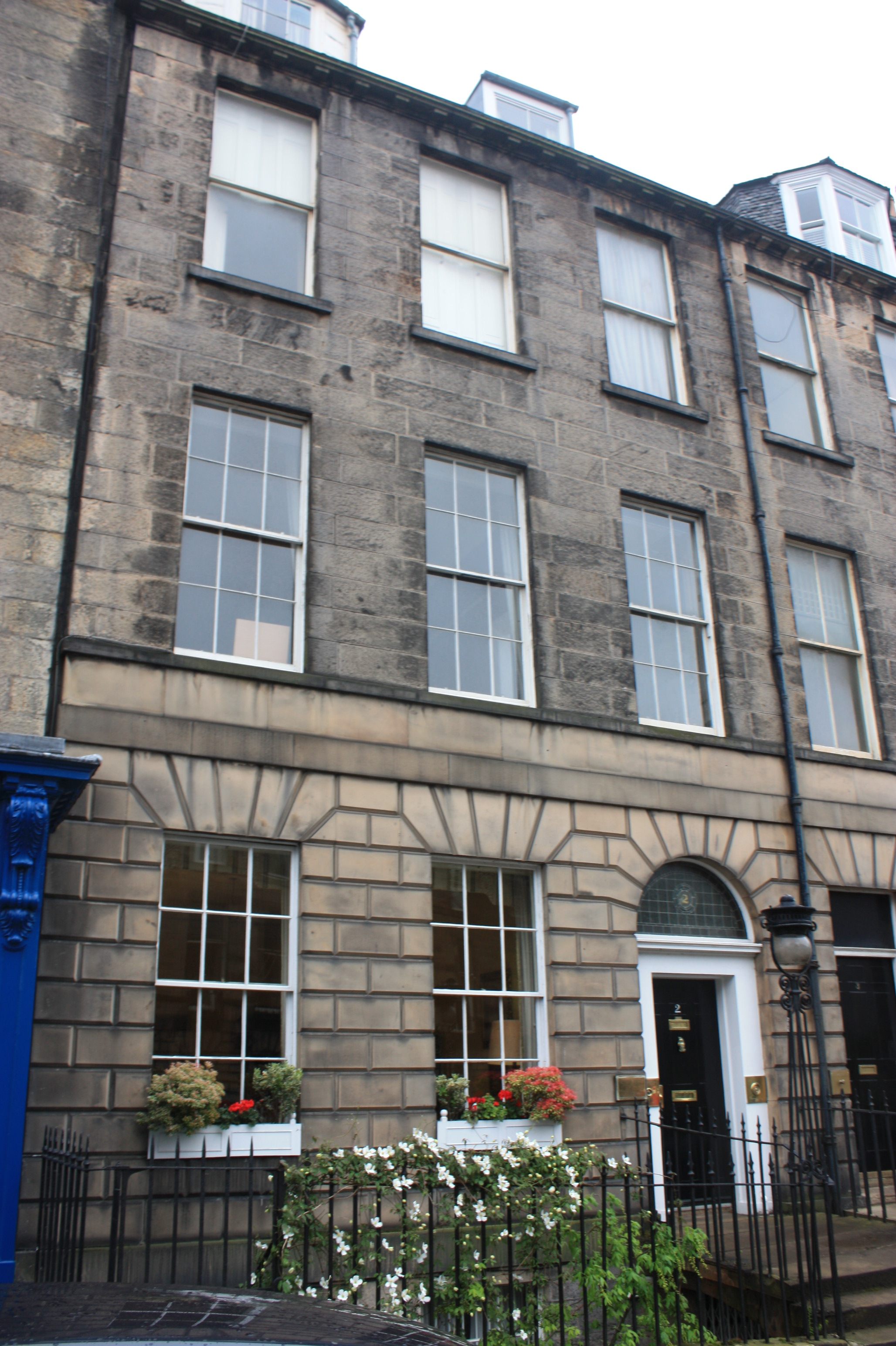
Kinross House, Abercromby Place, Edinburgh

John Kinross (3 July 1855 – 7 January 1931) was a Scottish architect. He was particularly skilled in traditional styles and was highly involved in the restoration of historic buildings, researching his subjects well before any project.

== Biography ==
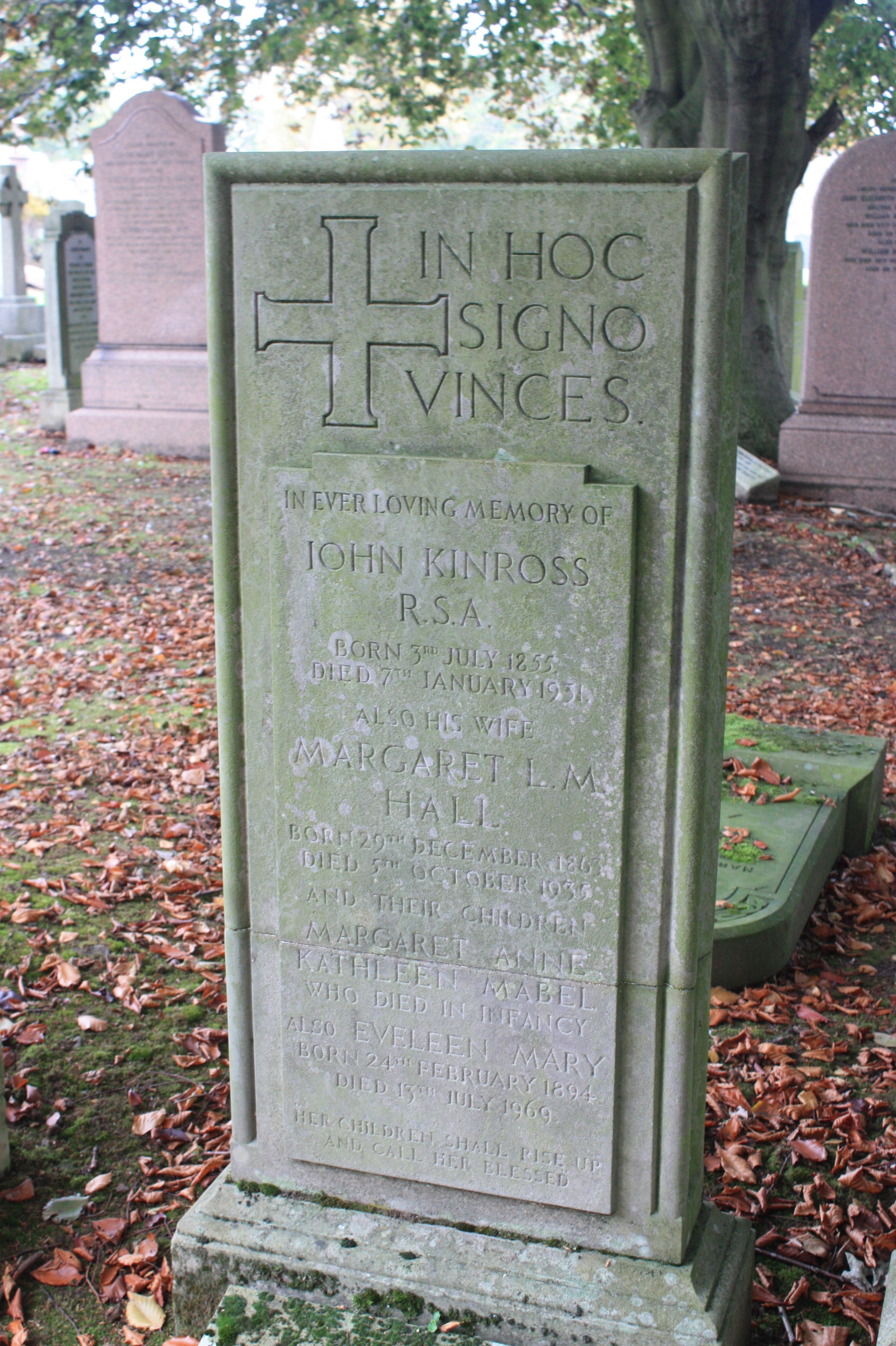
The grave of John Kinross, Grange Cemetery, Edinburgh

He was born in Shore Road in Stirling, the second son of William Kinross (1810-1874), a builder and owner of William Kinross and Sons, and his second wife, Ann Marshall. He was educated at Stirling High School.

Kinross was articled to Glasgow architect John Hutchison around 1870, and moved to the Edinburgh firm of Wardrop and Reid in 1875. He travelled to Italy in 1880 to study Renaissance buildings. In 1882 Kinross he established a partnership with Henry Seymour, which lasted until 1889. At this time he lived at 15 Leven Street in the Tollcross district.

Kinross was president of the Edinburgh Architectural Association (EAA) between 1890 and 1892, and was elected to the Royal Scottish Academy in 1905. Ebenezer James MacRae trained under him in 1908.

He completed many commissions for the Scottish Episcopal Church in his early years. During the 1890s he developed a style strongly influenced by Scottish architecture of the 17th century. He carried out extensive research to complete a number of important restorations, including Falkland Palace and the 15th-century Priory Church in South Queensferry. Several commissions came from the 3rd Marquis of Bute, an enthusiastic restorer. He also carried out numerous domestic commissions, among the most important was his rebuilding of Manderston in Berwickshire (1901–1905). After 1905 he experienced a decline in commissions for new houses, and began submitting competition proposals. After the First World War he completed several war memorials, and also contributed time to Edinburgh College of Art. He suffered a breakdown in 1920, but continued in practice, and continued his involvement with the RSA.

Kinross had his office at 2 Abercromby Place (now called Kinross House) and lived at 67 Braid Road. His son established the John Kinross Scholarshipin 1982 to aid architectural students.

He is buried in Grange Cemetery near the western edge of its Southwest Extension. His wife Mary Hall, and son John Blythe Kinross CBE HRSA (1904-1989), a financier and philanthropist, lie with him.

== Principal Projects ==
- Major enlargement of St. Baldred's Episcopal Church, North Berwick (1884)
- New Carriage Works for his family's firm, Stirling, Scotland (1884)
- Restoration of Falkland Palace (1887-1892)
- St. Michael's Church, Edinburgh (1888)
- Restoration of St. Mary's Episcopal Church, South Queensferry (1889)
- Restoration and multiple buildings on the estate at Manderston House, Berwickshire (1890-1910)
- Restoration of Thurston House, East Lothian (1891)
- St. Peter's Episcopal Church, Torry near Aberdeen (1897)
- Carlekemp, North Berwick (1898)
- Archaeological investigation and restoration of Pluscarden Abbey (1898-1900)
- 31,33 and 35 Mortonhall Road, Edinburgh (1898) (33 as his own house)
- Restoration of Straiton Parish Church and addition of bell-tower (1899)
- Restoration of Michael Kirk at Gordonstoun (1900)
- Various buildings at Altyre House, Morayshire (1901-2)
- Co-operative Emporium, Penicuik (1904)
- Remodelling of Ardtornish House (1908)
- Gravestone for Henry Kinross (an uncle?) Church of the Holy Rude, Stirling (1916)
- 22 Hermitage Drive, Edinburgh (1920)
- Cockburnspath War Memorial (1920)
- Stone base, Cupar War Memorial (1920)(statuary by Henry Snell Gamley)
- Montrose War Memorial (1920)(statuary by Henry Snell Gamley)
- Buckie War Memorial (1920)(statuary by William Birnie Rhind)
- Fettes College War Memorial (1921) (statuary by William Birnie Rhind)
- Kirriemuir Parish War Memorial (1921) (statuary by Henry Hutcheon)
- Markinch War Memorial (1921)
- Morningside Free church War Memorial (1921) (statuary by Henry Snell Gamley)
- Monument to Alistair Hunter MacFarlane in St. Giles Cathedral, Edinburgh (1922)
