= Yair Bridge =

Bridge in the Scottish Borders, Scotland

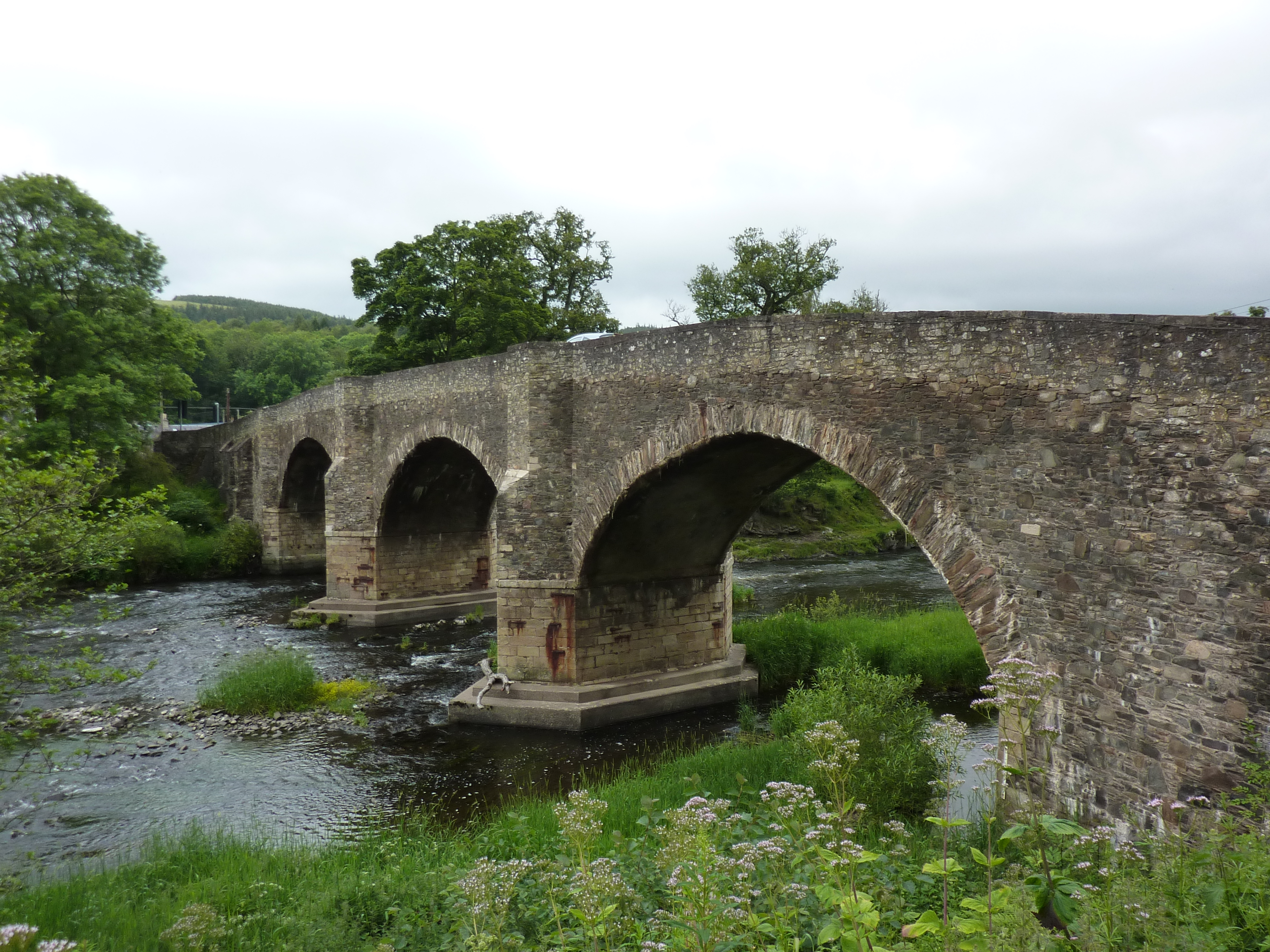
- Coordinates: 55.5836°N 2.8611°W
- Carries: A707
- Crosses: River Tweed

Characteristics
- Material: Stone
- Total length: 146 feet (45 m)
- No. of spans: 3

History
- Designer: William Mylne
- Opened: 1764

Listed Building – Category A
- Official name: Yair Bridge
- Designated: 11 March 1971
- Reference no.: LB1901

Location
- Interactive map of Yair Bridge

The Yair Bridge or Fairnilee Bridge is a bridge across the River Tweed at Yair, near Galashiels in the Scottish Borders.

== History ==
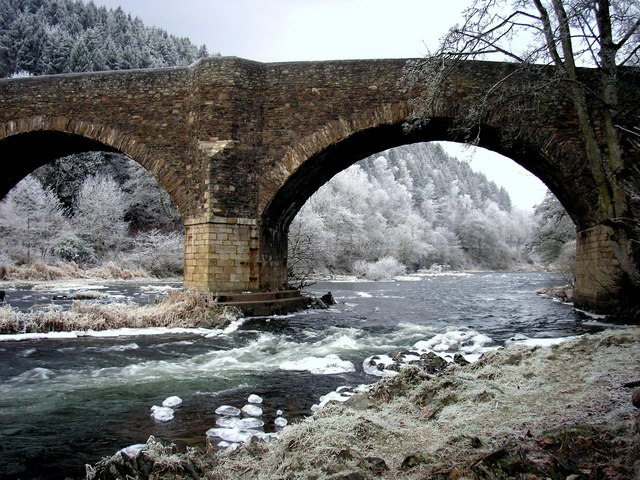
The bridge in winter

It was built in around 1764, with William Mylne acting as both designer and contractor. Its construction was authorised by an Act of Parliament obtained in 1764, for 12 miles (19 km) of road that would cost 6560l, including the "substantial" bridge at Fairnilee.

It was listed as a Category A listed building in 1971.

The bridge was substantially rebuilt between 1987 and 1988, with the addition of reinforcing concrete.

== Design ==
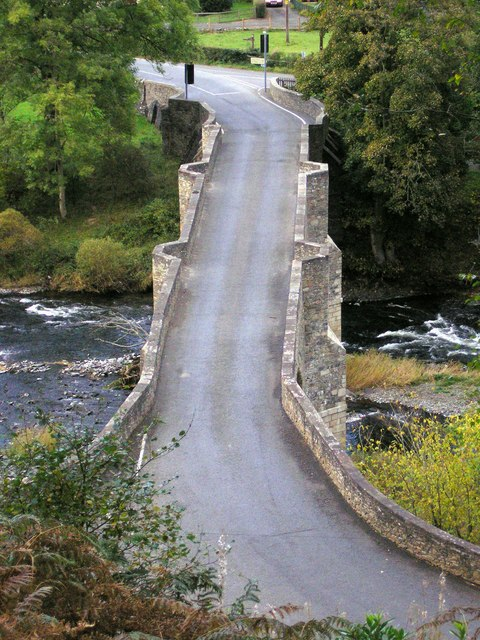
The bridge viewed from the south

It has three arches of 42 feet (13 m) span, and is 22 feet (6.7 m) clear over the river. The total length of the bridge is 146 feet (45 m). The width between the parapets is 13 feet 9 inches (4.19 m), but the cutwaters are carried up to form semi-hexagonal pedestrian refuges. The piers and abutments are made from block masonry, and the rest of the structure is made from rubble.

The bridge carries the A707 public road across the River Tweed.

== See also ==
- List of bridges in Scotland
