= Commissioners in Lunacy for Scotland =

The Commissioners in Lunacy for Scotland or Lunacy Commission for Scotland were a public body established by the Lunacy (Scotland) Act 1857 to oversee asylums and the welfare of mentally ill people in Scotland.

== Previous bodies ==
The Madhouses (Scotland) Act 1815 established the right of Scottish Sheriffs to order the inspection of madhouses.

== Establishment ==
The Board of Commissioners in Lunacy for Scotland was established in 1857 by the Lunacy (Scotland) Act 1857. There were two Commissioners of Lunacy each paid £1,200 a year and two Deputy Commissioners each paid £600 a year.

Chairmen of the board were as follows:

- 1857-1859 William Elliot-Murray-Kynynmound, 3rd Earl of Minto
- 1859-1863 William Forbes Mackenzie
- 1863-1893 Sir John Don-Wauchope
- 1894-1897 Sir Thomas Gibson-Carmichael
- 1897-1909 Walter George Hepburne-Scott, 9th Lord Polwarth
- 1909-1913 Sir Thomas Mason

The Commissioners themselves were physicians. Mainly based at 51 Queen Street in Edinburgh. These included:

- Dr John Fraser FRSE 1895 - 1910

== Asylums commissioned ==
The legislation created a General Board of Commissioners in Lunacy for Scotland. It also created district boards with the power to establish and operate publicly funded "district asylums" for patients who could not afford the fees charged by existing private and charitable "Royal Asylums". These existing "Royal Asylums" (with Royal Charters) were the Aberdeen Royal Lunatic Asylum, the Crichton Royal Institution, the Dundee Royal Lunatic Asylum, the Royal Edinburgh Lunatic Asylum, the Glasgow Royal Lunatic Asylum, the Montrose Royal Lunatic Asylum and James Murray's Royal Lunatic Asylum. The aim of the legislation was to establish a network of "district asylums" with coverage throughout Scotland.

The following asylums were commissioned under the auspices of the Commissioners in Lunacy for Scotland:

- Aberdeen District Asylum, 1904
- Argyll and Bute District Asylum, 1863
- Ayrshire District Asylum, 1869
- Banff District Asylum, 1865
- East Lothian District Asylum, 1866
- Edinburgh District Asylum, 1906
- Elgin District Asylum, 1835
- Fife and Kinross District Asylum, 1866
- City of Glasgow District Asylum, 1896
- Glasgow Woodilee District Asylum, 1875
- Govan District Asylum, 1895
- Inverness District Asylum, 1864
- Kirklands District Asylum, 1881
- Lanark District Asylum, 1895
- Midlothian District Asylum, 1874
- Paisley District Asylum, 1876
- Perth District Asylum, 1864
- Renfrew District Asylum, 1909
- Roxburgh District Asylum, 1872
- Stirling District Asylum, 1869

In addition the Southern Counties Asylum, which was intended to provide facilities for paupers, was erected on the site of the Crichton Royal Institution (which focused on fee paying patients) in 1849 but subsequently amalgamated with the Crichton Royal Institution. Likewise the Dundee District Asylum, which was intended to provide facilities for paupers, was established alongside the Dundee Royal Lunatic Asylum (which focused on fee paying patients) in 1903 but subsequently amalgamated with the Dundee Royal Lunatic Asylum.

== Successors ==
The Mental Deficiency and Lunacy (Scotland) Act 1913 replaced the Commission with the General Board of Control for Scotland.

== See also ==
- Commissioners in Lunacy (for England and Wales)
- Commissioners in Lunacy for Ireland

== Sources ==
- Keane, A. M. (1987). "Mental Health Policy in Scotland, 1908-1960" (PDF). University of Edinburgh.
