= Peter Womersley =

English architect

Peter Womersley FRIBA
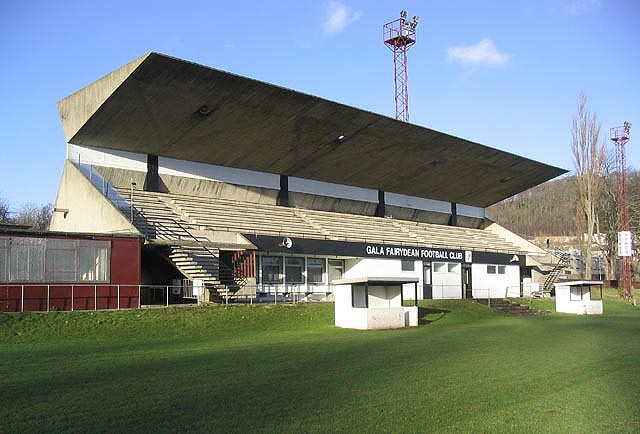
- Netherdale, Galashiels (1963)
- Born: 24 June 1923
- Died: August 1993 (age 70); Lambeth, London, England
- Education: Architectural Association School of Architecture
- Occupation: Architect
- Years active: 1952-1993
- Buildings: Netherdale; Bernat Klein Studio; High Sunderland; Roxburgh County Buildings
- Design: Modernist; Brutalist

Charles Peter Womersley ARSA FRIBA (24 June 1923 – August 1993) was an English architect, best known for his work in the modernist style. He lived in the Scottish Borders, where a number of his buildings are located (such as the headquarters of Scottish Borders Council), although he worked on projects throughout the United Kingdom. Influenced principally by the work of Frank Lloyd Wright and the American Case Study Houses, Womersley's buildings employ such typical modernist elements as in-situ concrete and strong geometric forms; although he introduced a wider palette of materials than was typically used by Le Corbusier and his followers.

== Biography ==
Womersley was born on 24 June 1923.

Womersley was originally intending to study law at Cambridge University, but was called up for service in the Second World War. He saw little action, however, and from 1946 to 1951 he studied architecture at the Architectural Association in London. He spent time in Kuwait, where he assisted in the design of a palace for a sheikh.

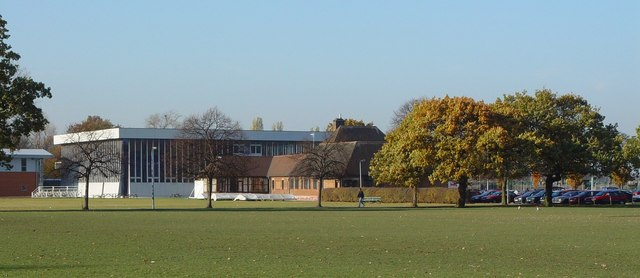
University of Hull Sports Centre (1963–1965)

In 1952 he was admitted to the Royal Institute of British Architects (RIBA). His first commission was a house for his brother, John Womersley, at Farnley Tyas near Huddersfield. This house, known as Farnley Hey, won the RIBA bronze medal in 1958, and has been described as "one of the best demonstrations of the influence of Frank Lloyd Wright in Britain." The house is located in woodland, at the edge of a steep valley, and features pale lilac-coloured brickwork, extensive glazing, and timber boarding. Although designed in 1952, construction only began in 1954 after planning rules were changed. Womersley designed an extension in 1956.

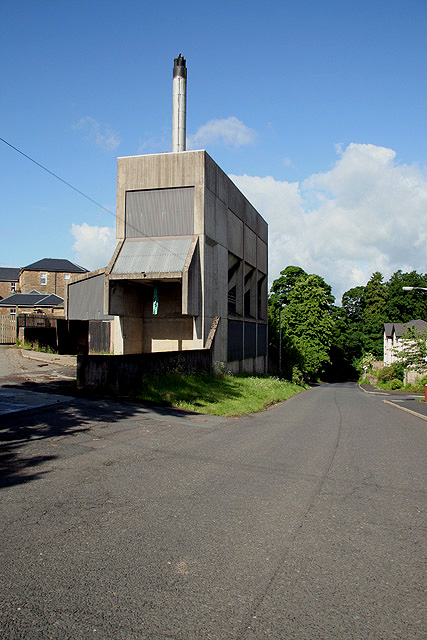
The disused boiler house near Melrose (1977)

Womersley then moved to the Scottish Borders, where he built The Rig, his home and studio in Gattonside near Melrose, in 1957. The same year, he worked on a house for the textile artist Bernat Klein near Selkirk. This house, High Sunderland, was also located in dense woodland, within the parks of the 19th-century Sunderland Hall, and was decorated internally with fabrics of Klein's own designs. The modular design has been described as a forerunner to Benjamin's Mount (1967), a house by Ernő Goldfinger. Womersley continued to concentrate on private houses, but obtained relatively few commissions. However, his practice began to take off in 1961 when he won the competition to design the Roxburgh County Offices (now the headquarters of Scottish Borders Council), and also gained a commission for a sports centre at the University of Hull. His practice remained small, with no more than five employees, but Womersley produced a number of notable buildings until the late 1970s.

The Nuffield Transplantation Surgery Unit (1963) at Edinburgh's Western General Hospital was "the first experimental building specifically designed for the transplantation of human organs." Other healthcare projects included an admissions unit for Haddington District Asylum (1963), now the Garlton Unit of Herdmanflat Hospital, and a GP's practice in Kelso. Collaborating with engineers Ove Arup, he designed a stadium for Gala Fairydean F.C. (1963), incorporating cantilevered structures of board-marked concrete to create the effect of a floating canopy. In 1969 he designed a studio for Bernat Klein, adjacent to High Sunderland. Strongly reminiscent of Frank Lloyd Wright's Fallingwater, the studio remains Womersley's best-known building, and was nominated as one of Scotland's 100 "Treasured Places" in 2008. The same year he was commissioned to design an extension to Edinburgh College of Art, but his highly articulated proposals were rejected. Later designs include the "sculptural" boiler house at the former Melrose District Asylum, and Monklands Leisure Centre in Coatbridge (both 1977).

High Sunderland, the Bernat Klein Studio and Gala Fairydean Stadium are now protected as Category A listed buildings, the highest level of protection for a building in Scotland of "special architectural or historic interest". In addition, The Rig and the Garlton Unit in Haddington were listed at Category B in 2007, and the boiler house in Melrose in 2008. In England, Farnley Hey is listed at Grade II by English Heritage.

== Personal life ==
Womersley was intensely private, rarely giving interviews. His relationship with the Klein family (for whom he designed multiple buildings) was so close that he was designated the legal guardian of Bernat Klein's children. Womersley was gay, and Klein's daughter speculates the two men's close relationship was, in part, a result of them both being outsiders - Klein being a Serbian emigré.

== Significant works ==
Name	Location	Date	Notes	Coord.	Ref.
Farnley Hey	near Farnley Tyas, Huddersfield, West Yorkshire	1952–1955	Private house for the architect's brother, extended by the architect 1956. Grade II listed.	53°36′43″N 1°46′16″W	
High Sunderland	near Selkirk, Scottish Borders	1956–1957	Private house for textile designer Bernat Klein. Category A listed.	55°34′28″N 2°50′12″W	
The Rig	Gattonside, Scottish Borders	1956	Womersley's own house and studio, converted into two houses by the architect in 1978. Category B listed.	55°36′28″N 2°43′32″W	
Valley Spring	Bath, Somerset	1960s	House	51°21′24″N 2°21′41″W	
House	Port Murray, Maidens, South Ayrshire Demolished August 2016	1960–1963	Demolished August 2016	55°19′57″N 4°49′42″W	
Church Square	Galashiels, Scottish Borders	1961		55°36′46″N 2°48′21″W	
Murray and Sanderson offices	Galashiels, Scottish Borders	1961	Now occupied by Cameron Associates, architects	55°37′16″N 2°48′57″W	
Fairydean Stadium	Galashiels, Scottish Borders	1963	Still in use, Category A listed.	55°36′23″N 2°47′03″W	
North Lodge, Haddington District Asylum	Haddington, East Lothian	1963	Now the Garlton Unit, psychiatric admission unit at Herdmanflat Hospital. Category B listed.	55°57′37″N 2°47′17″W	
Nuffield Transplantation Surgery Unit	Western General Hospital, Edinburgh	1963	Still in use, extended in 2007 by Aitken Turnbull.	55°57′40″N 3°13′58″W	
University of Hull Sports Centre	Kingston upon Hull, East Riding of Yorkshire	1963–1965	Still in use, included on local buildings list by Hull City Council.	53°46′26″N 0°22′08″W	
Edenside Group Practice Surgery & Caretaker's House	Kelso, Scottish Borders	1965	Still in use, though altered.	55°36′14″N 2°25′49″W	
Roxburgh County Buildings	Newtown St Boswells, Scottish Borders	1966	Roxburgh County Buildings Phase I, following competition of 1961. Now the headquarters of Scottish Borders Council, with recent extensions	55°34′40″N 2°40′26″W	
Bernat Klein Studio, High Sunderland	near Selkirk, Scottish Borders	1969	Studio adjacent to High Sunderland house, for textile designer Bernat Klein. Modified c. 2006. Category A listed.	55°34′24″N 2°50′13″W	
Midland Bank	New Street, Huddersfield	1971	Now HSBC	55°34′24″N 2°50′13″W	
Boiler House, Melrose District Asylum	near Melrose, Scottish Borders	1977	Consent for conversion to domestic residential use in 2008. Category B listed.	53°38′45″N 1°46′59″W	
Monklands Leisure Centre	Coatbridge, North Lanarkshire	1977	Still in use	55°51′35″N 4°02′08″W	
