= High Sunderland =

House in Galashiels, Scottish Borders, Scotland

Coordinates: 55.574970°N 2.836659°W

High Sunderland is a Modernist house built in woodland in the grounds of the 19th-century Sunderland Hall, between Selkirk and Galashiels in the Scottish Borders. It was designed in 1957 by Peter Womersley for the textile artist Bernat Klein and his wife Peggy, and completed in 1958. The interior was decorated with exotic woods, and with fabrics specially designed by Klein. The house, with its clear and coloured panes of glass within a wooden structure, and its woodland setting, has been described as like "a Mondrian set within a Klimt".

Womersley designed a separate studio for Klein in 1969, which was completed near the house in 1972. The strong horizontal and vertical concrete structure of the studio are reminiscent of Frank Lloyd Wright's Fallingwater.

The house and the studio, two largely unaltered examples of Womersley's modular Modernist architecture, are separately listed in Category A, as "buildings of national or international importance".

== Background ==
The house was commissioned in 1956, after Klein and his wife saw the Modernist Farnley Hey, designed by Womersley and built in 1954 south of Huddersfield. Farnley Hey was awarded a RIBA bronze medal: it was given as a wedding present to Womersley's brother John, and is now listed at Grade II. Klein admired its rough stone walls and large windows, although the stone elements were omitted at High Sunderland to reduce costs. Its modular design has been described as a forerunner to Benjamin's Mount, a 1967 house by Ernő Goldfinger in Windlesham and now Grade II* listed.

The single-storey house was designed for a 3 acres (1.2 ha) woodland site that Klein had acquired in the grounds of Sunderland Hall, an 1850 Scottish Baronial mansion designed David Bryce and now itself Category B listed. The estate lies near the confluence of Ettrick Water and the River Tweed, south of Galashiels, where Klein had acquired a mill to make the fabrics that he designed. Womersley had himself moved to the Scottish Borders in 1957, where he built The Rig, his home and studio in Gattonside near Melrose, also Category B listed.

A decade later, in 1969, Womersley designed a separate studio for Klein near High Sunderland. Strongly reminiscent of Frank Lloyd Wright's Fallingwater, the studio remains one of Womersley's best-known buildings.

High Sunderland and the Bernat Klein Studio are separately protected as Category A listed buildings, the highest level of protection for a building in Scotland, for "buildings of national or international importance".

== House ==
The main house is large, low rectangular building with a flat roof, constructed in Modernist style in a clearing on a sloping woodland site beside the A707 about 2.5 km (1.6 mi) north of Selkirk, looking east over the Ettrick Water towards the triple peak of Eildon Hill. It was originally intended for use as Klein's design office as well as his family home.

The single storey structure was made from Makore wood on a concrete raft, with 14 bays by 5 bays on a 8 ft (2.4 m) grid. The exterior bays are largely filled by clear plyglass glazing separated vertically by the wood structure, and horizontally by two white horizontal strips, a base course band with a higher clerestory band, and then topped by a white facia at the eaves with aluminium trim. The separate internal areas for living, bathing and sleeping are denoted by panels of laminated glass (coloured vitroslab), with some bays filled with vertically boarded Makore.

An area, 2 by 7 bays to the southwest corner, forms an open car port. An entrance screen on the south façade has five horizontal panels containing tile mosaics added later by Bernat Klein. An open area left as a courtyard and pond at the northeast corner was later filled in. The boundary of the property is marked by drystone walls and gateposts.

The open plan interior retains its original design scheme, with bespoke fitted furniture and light fittings, travertine and tiled flooring, and ceilings of polished obeche wood. The décor includes textiles were specially designed, dyed and woven by Klein.

Space was maximised by reducing circulation spaces, with cupboards installed as dividing walls with flat concealed doors, using walnut and exotic woods such as idigbo and rosewood. The main living space has a sunken floor. An open plan playroom with sleeping alcoves was designed to be divided into separate bedrooms later. The modular design was intended to permit further extension: part of the courtyard and pond were used to create an office space when the separate studio building was sold in 1982.

Buildings taking inspiration from High Sunderland include Benjamin's Mount, designed by Ernő Goldfinger in 1967 and now Grade II*, which also adopts a modular flat-roofed open-plan design, but has two separate wings.

The house was listed in Category A in 2007. After Klein died in 2014, the house was marketed for sale in 2015, at an asking price of £795,000. Klein's daughter, Shelley Klein, published a memoir, The See-Through House, in 2020.

In 2017, the house was bought by architecture and design historians Juliet Kinchin and Paul Stirton. The property was damaged by a fire which occurred during the renovation period. However, restoration work was carried out by Glasgow-based architects, Loader Monteith, who upgraded the structure with invisible sustainable upgrades to insulation and wiring, as well as restoring with considerate care and attention the original fittings and interiors. Loader Monteith's work was awarded the 2022 AJ Retrofit Award, as well as a 2022 RIBA National Award. In July 2022, the property was shortlisted for the RIAS Andrew Doolan Best Building in Scotland Award.

House in 2016

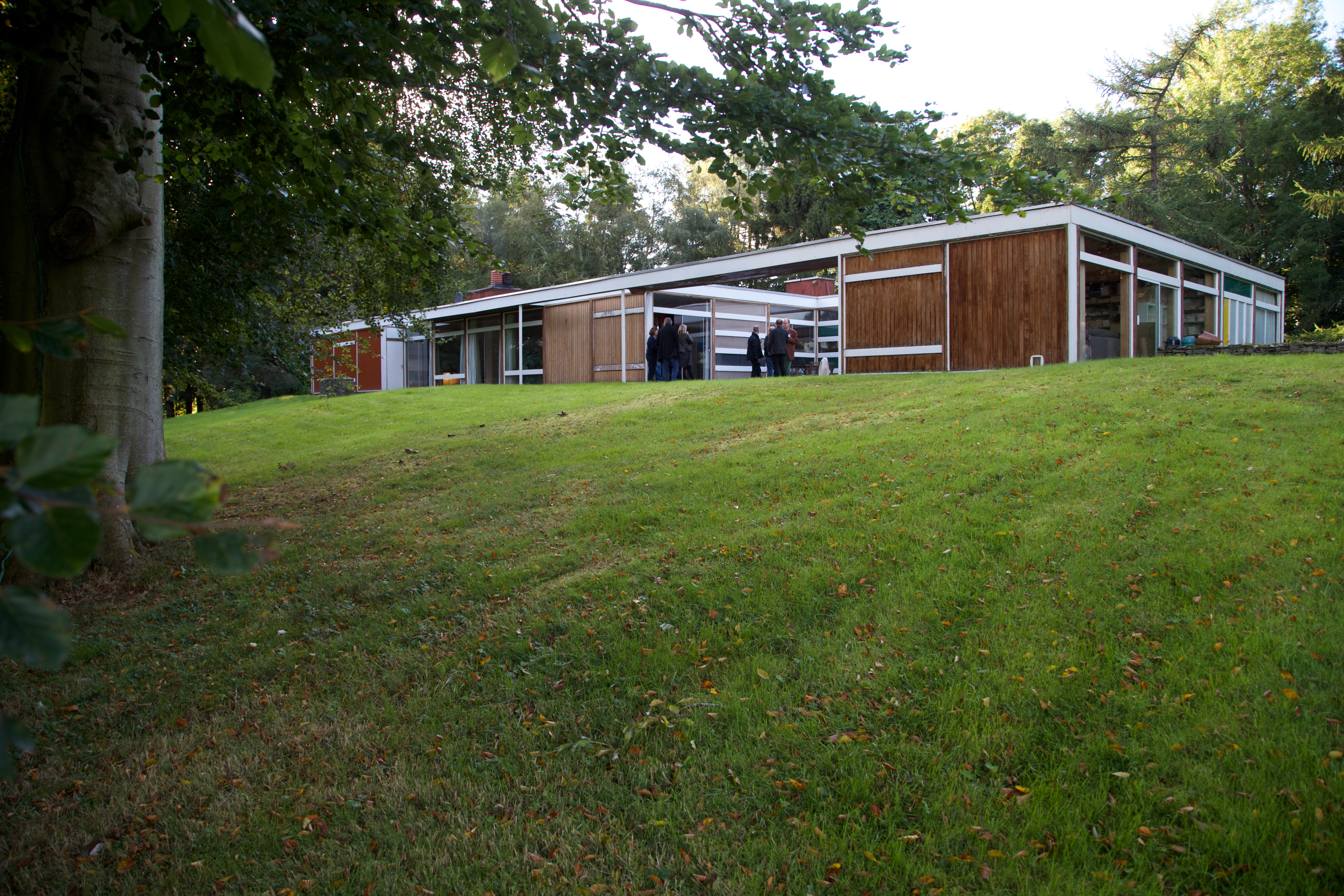

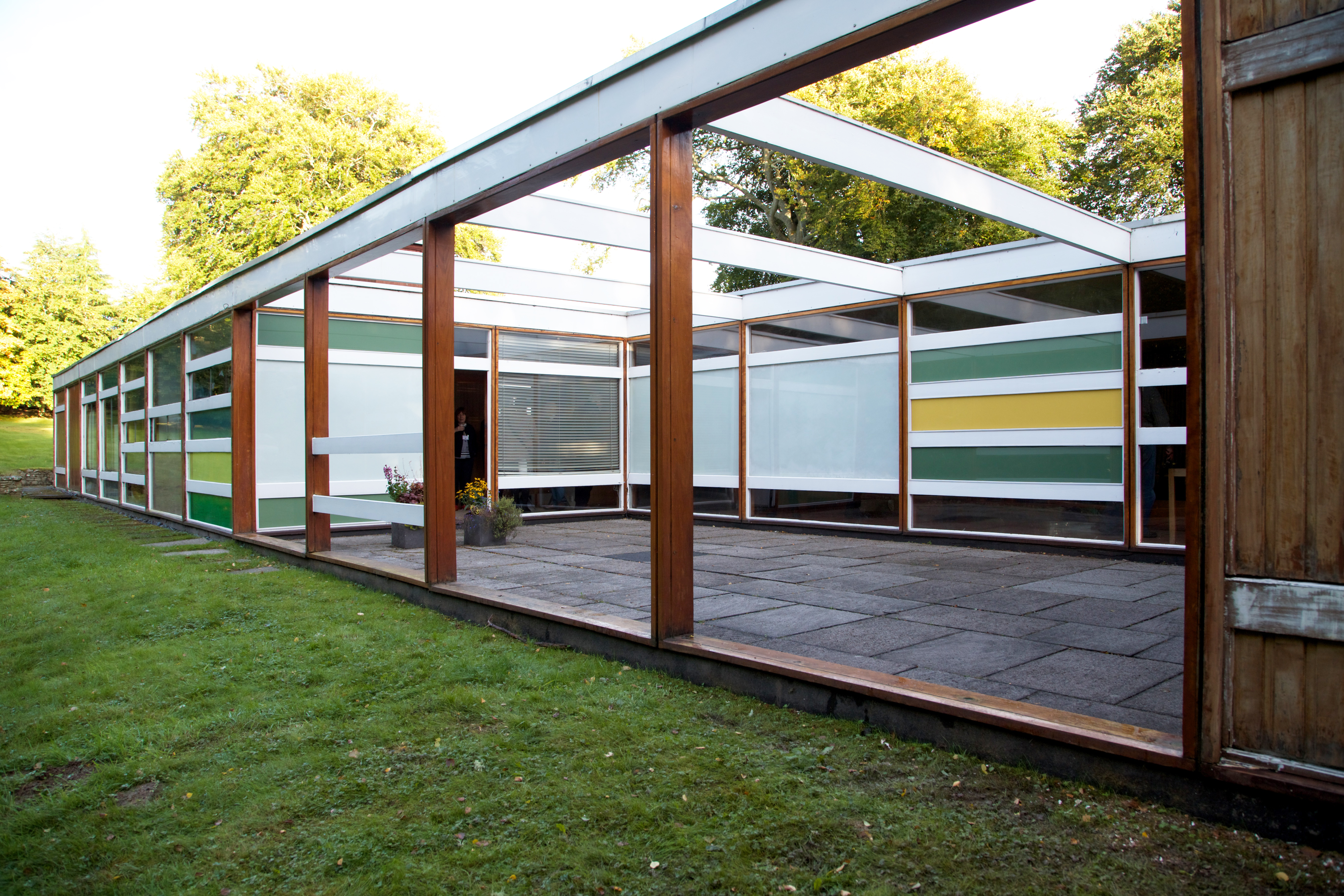

== Studio ==
The studio is separate rectangular two-storey building, also in Modernist style, on a sloping woodland site about 100 m (330 ft) south of the main house. It was designed in 1969 and completed in 1972. Its design incorporates elements of Frank Lloyd Wright's Fallingwater, combining the horizontal modular glazing adopted by Womersely in the main house at High Sunderland and for his own house at The Rig, with the concrete elements that Womersley used at the Gala Fairydean stadium at Netherdale in Galashiels and his 1963 Nuffield Transplantation Surgery Unit at the Western General Hospital.

It was constructed using deep horizontal concrete beams supported by four main concrete columns, and with glazing in anodised aluminium frames. It stands on a brick plinth, with an overhanging upper floor, and a central brick service core extending through to the flat roof. A concrete bridge provides access directly to the upper floor from the rising ground to the north. The open plan interior studio is arranged on two floors around the stairs and services in the central brick core. Kitchens were added to both floors in 2006.

The studio won a RIBA award in 1973 for its design and use of materials, and the same year it also won the Centenary Medal of the Edinburgh Architectural Association. It was listed in Category B in 1994, and upgraded to Category A in July 2002.

With Klein's business in financial difficulties, the studio was sold in 1982 and used by Borders Enterprise for a short time as Textile Information Centre. It was sold to a private owner in around 2000, and permission was given in 2006 to convert the studio to residential use, including adding a new structure to the roof, but it remains unused and in poor repair. It has been on the Buildings at Risk Register since 2002. In July 2025 the estate agents Savills announced that they had been instructed to sell the property by auction, with a guide price of £18,000, but it was sold for £279,000 to a coalition of design and conservation charities led by the National Trust for Scotland.

Studio in 2010

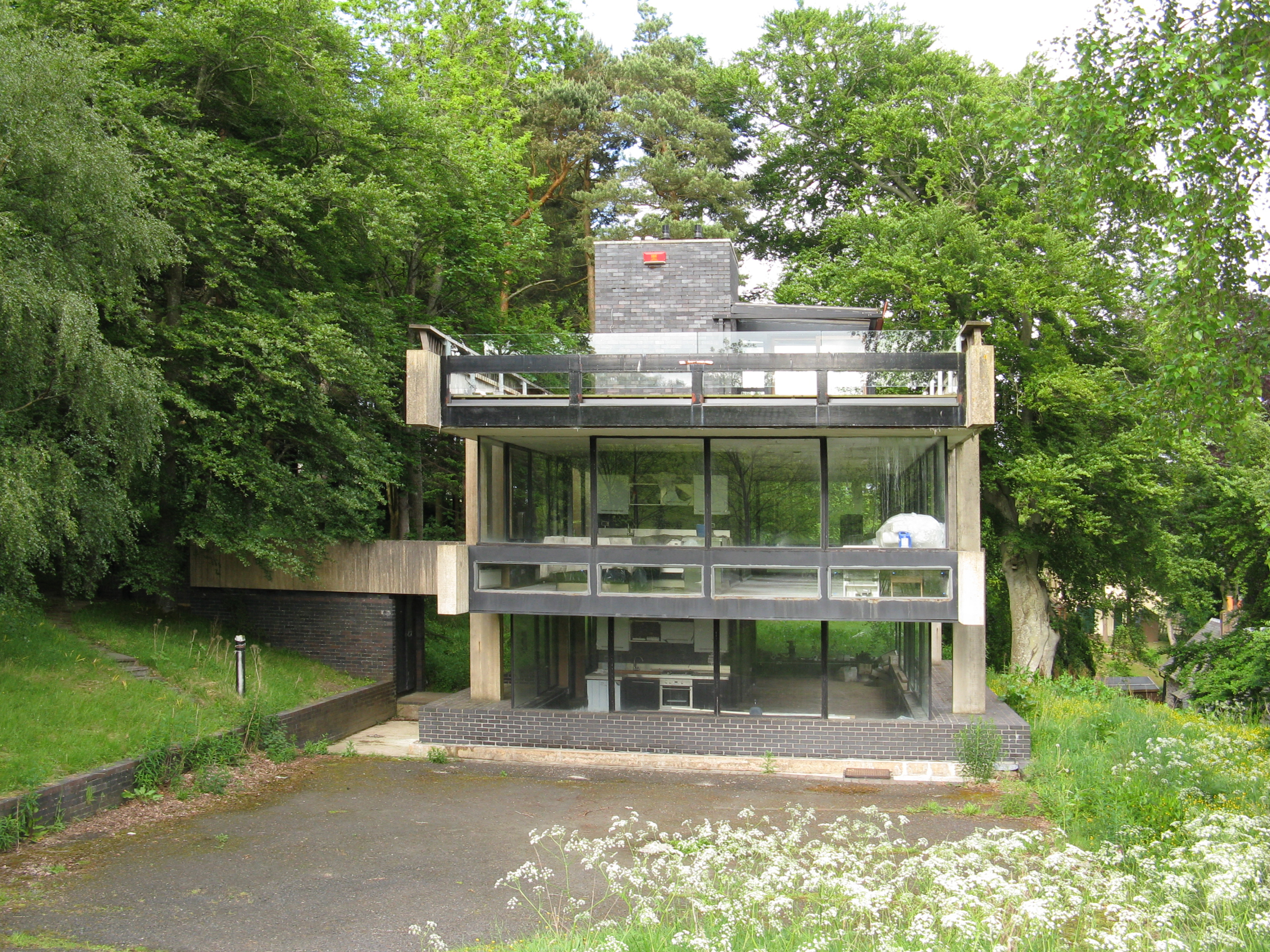

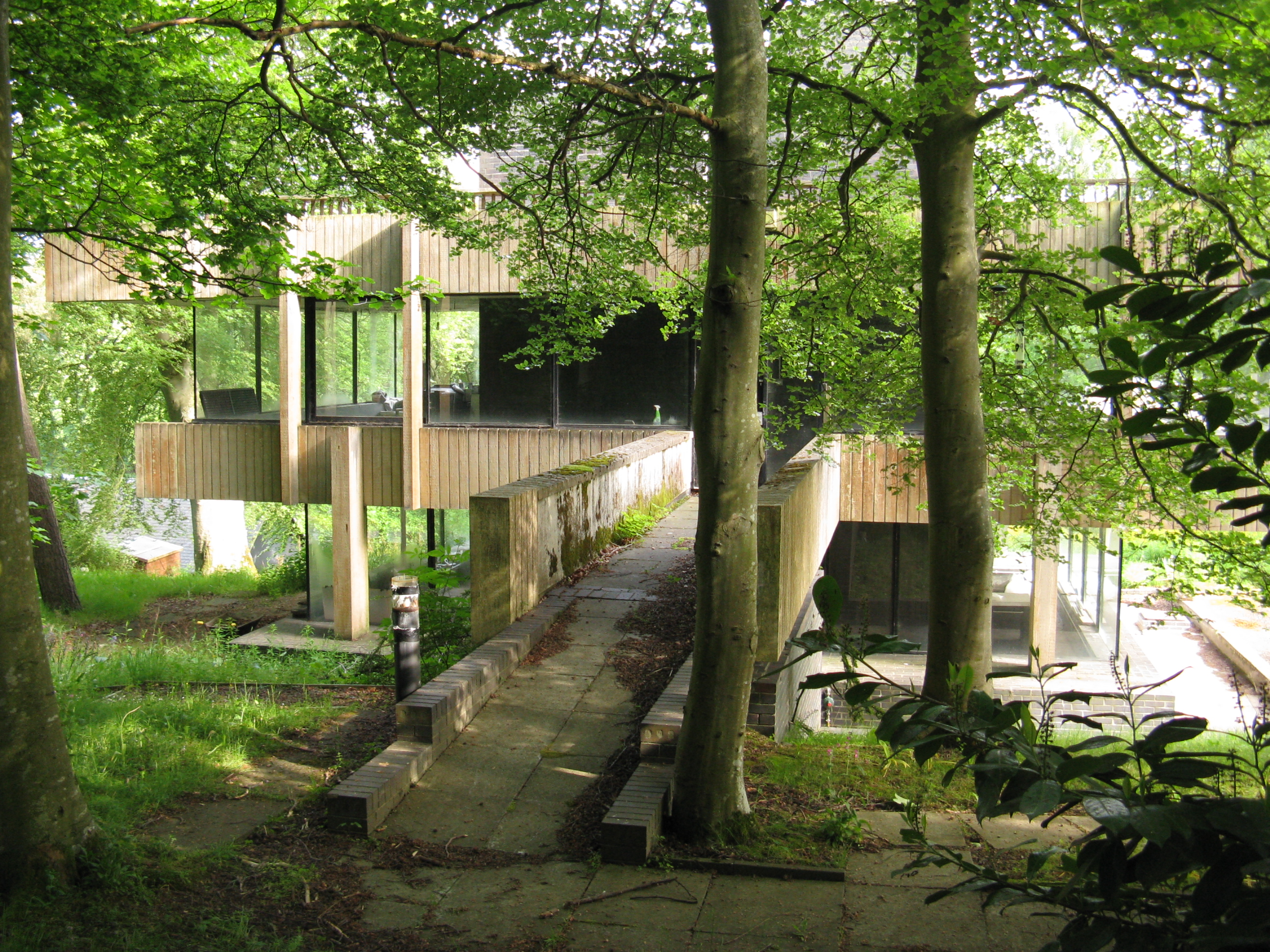

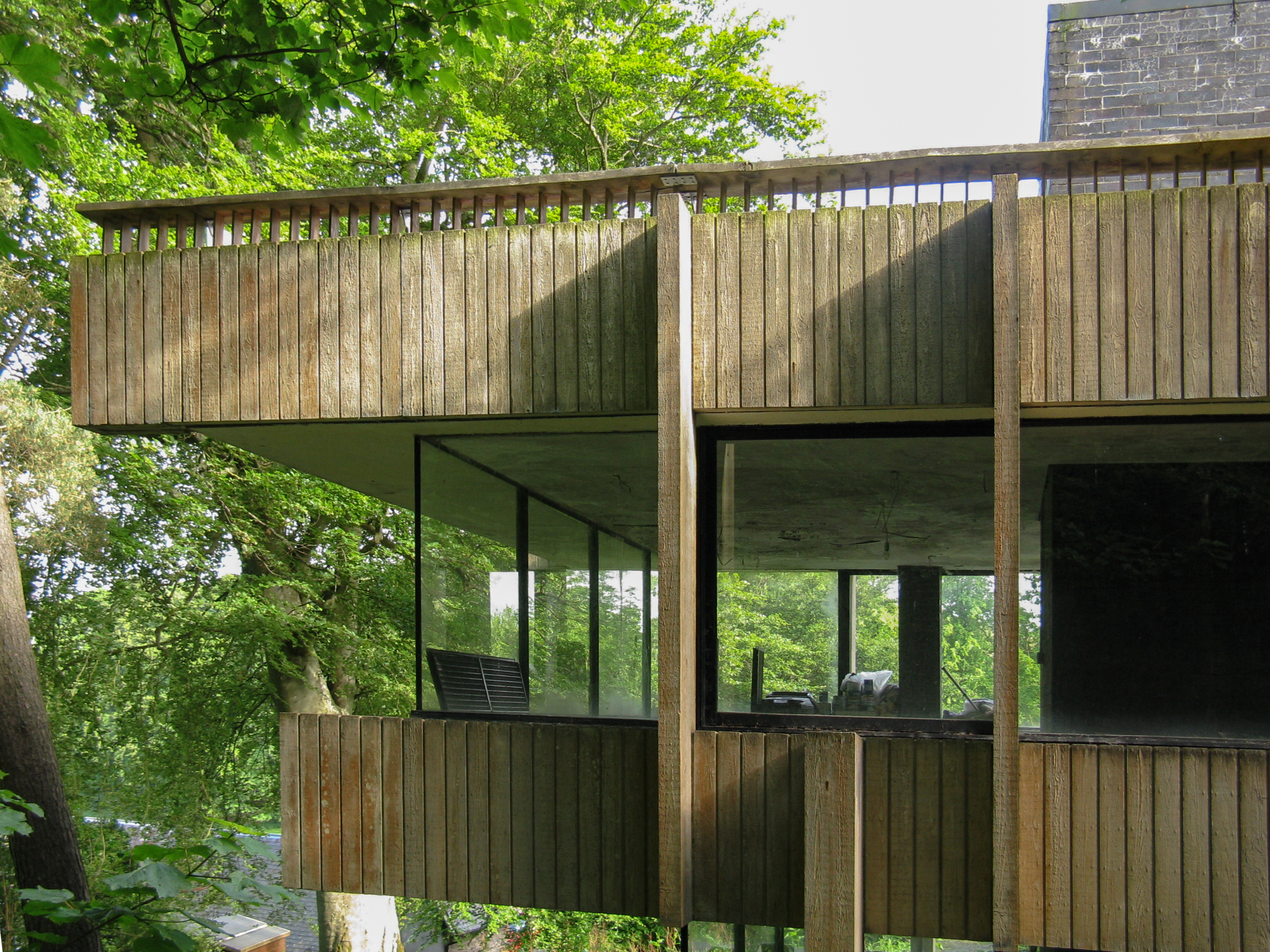

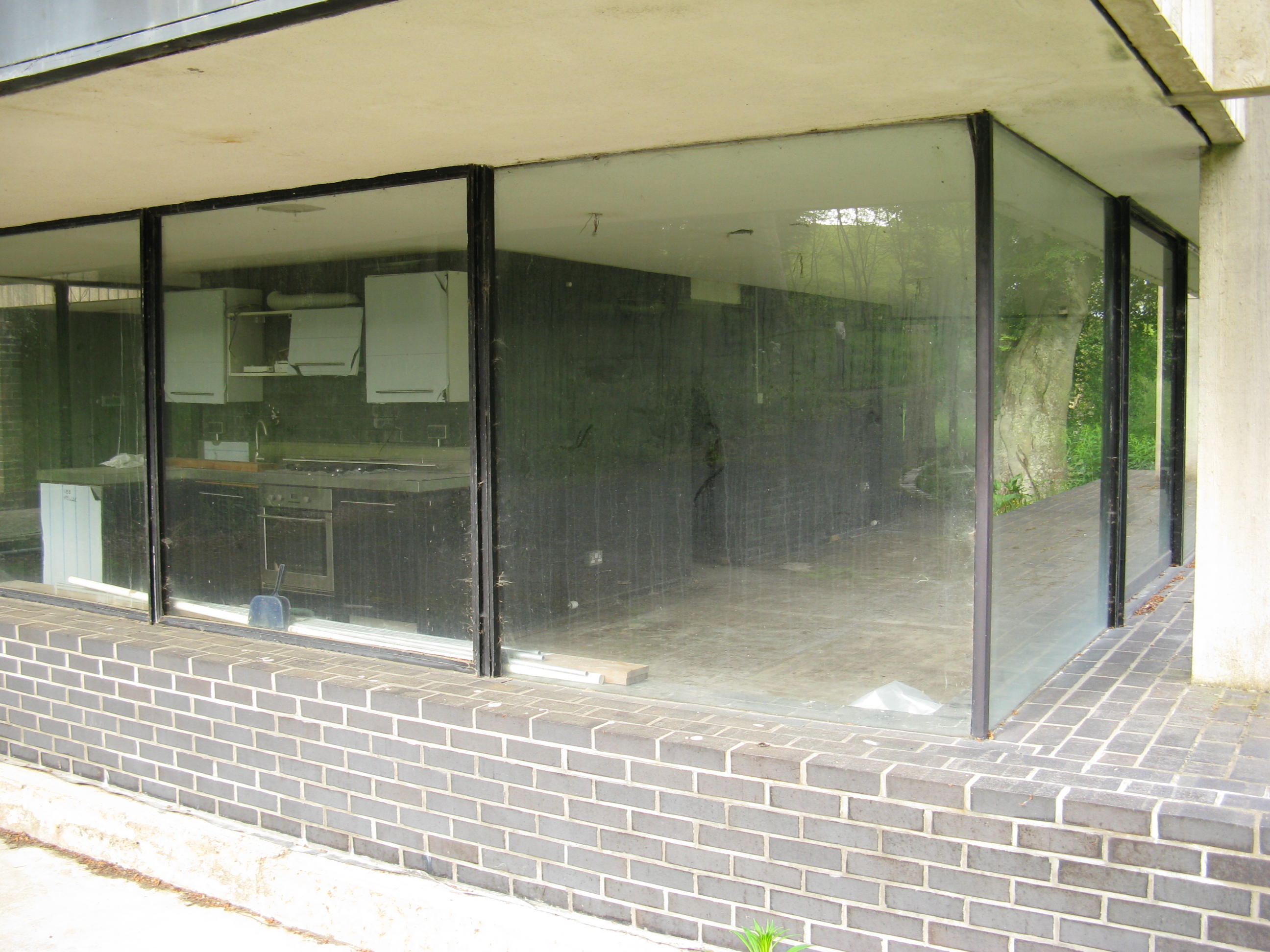

== See also ==
- DoCoMoMo Key Scottish Monuments
- List of Category A listed buildings in the Scottish Borders
- Prospect 100 best modern Scottish buildings
