= Bernat Klein =

Serbian textile designer and painter

Bernat Klein CBE
- Klein in the 1960s
- Born: 6 November 1922; Senta, Kingdom of Serbs, Croats and Slovenes
- Died: 17 April 2014 (aged 91); Selkirk, Scottish Borders, Scotland
- Education: Bezalel Academy of Arts and Design; University of Leeds
- Known for: Textile design, painting
- Awards: Design Council Award (1968)

Bernat Klein CBE (6 November 1922 – 17 April 2014) was a Serbian textile designer and painter. Based in Scotland, Klein supplied textiles to haute couture designers in the 1960s and 1970s, and later sold his own clothing collections.

== Biography ==
Klein was born in 1922 in Senta, Kingdom of Serbs, Croats and Slovenes. In 1940 he attended the Bezalel Academy of Arts and Design, Jerusalem, and then moved on to the University of Leeds, England, where he studied textile technology from 1945. He was employed by various textile companies in England and Scotland, until 1952 when he established Colourcraft (Gala) Ltd. This comprised a weaving centre in Galashiels in the Scottish Borders, producing rugs and other items which were sold at the company's own shop in Edinburgh. He created innovative textiles, building up trade with producers such as Marks and Spencer.

In 1962, Coco Chanel chose Klein's mohair tweed womenswear textiles for her 1963 spring/summer collection, which led to greater exposure and further sales to couture houses in the US and Europe including Dior, Balenciaga, Pierre Cardin and Saint Laurent. The company was renamed Bernat Klein Limited, and a major stake in the business was acquired by a subsidiary of Imperial Tobacco.

Klein resigned from this company in 1966, setting up on his own again. He based himself at his home near Selkirk, where he commissioned a studio building from the architect Peter Womersley, who had designed Klein's house, High Sunderland, in the 1950s. He established a cottage industry of hand-knitters, employing up to 250 people. During the 1970s he began producing his own clothing collections, and later established himself as a design and colour consultant. The Department of the Environment commissioned him in the latter capacity to develop standard ranges of carpets and upholstery fabrics.

Klein drew inspiration from nature for his textiles and paintings. His signature fabrics include colourful exotic tweeds, incorporating mohair and ribbons, as well as velvet and jersey fabrics. He won the Design Council Award in 1968, and was awarded an honorary degree from Heriot-Watt University in 2003.

== Branding ==
In 1962, Klein's company was renamed Bernat Klein Ltd and marketed textiles to Europe and North America, propelled by the support of Robert Sinclair Tobacco. The Helvetica font was used for the "Bernat Klein" logo which graphic design was meticulously determined. Throughout branding material, his family home in High Sunderland and the Bernat Klein Studio was frequently featured to link Klein's personality with the company's identity. It also succeeded in associating the company with a modernist architectural image.

Through the 1960s, Bernat Klein built a good name in leading fashion publications in London and Paris. Because he sold clothes anonymously via global agents like Dumas-Maury and Chantal, as was common in the textile industry, Klein only became aware that Chanel used his mohair textiles in her 1963 collection after reading about it in French Elle.

In the late 1960s, Klein stepped away from high fashion to work on screen-printed textiles and ready-to-wear fashion. In 1973, he launched his first mail order catalogues for womenswear. The catalogue featured clothing made of the newly developed and screen-printed polyester jersey fabrics. Looks were arranged into colour groupings and a colour chart was included to allow consumers to mix and choose products that fitted themselves. Klein also sold fabrics so that consumers could hand-knit their own Bernat Klein creations. Margaret Klein hand-knitted a range of patterns using his textiles, which were showcased in catalogues.

== Textile techniques ==
Klein integrated a space-dyeing or random dyeing process so that he could include up to eight colours in a single yarn, in other words, up to 32 colours in a single cloth. Combining brushed and space-dyed mohair in multiple hues enabled luminous colour effects on the tweeds. His clothes were highly textural, which met the demand for clean-lined coats and suits in high fashion of the 1960s, and were often made out of woven mohair, wool, silk, and synthetic fibres. Colour balancing was essential, so he designed a "5000 piece colour dictionary" which consisted of many colour boards, to assist him in textile design and communication with dyers and painters.

== Oil painting ==
Klein's textile designs were inspired by the Scottish and Banat landscape. He deconstructed images from nature into flat planes of colour, and created oil paintings with a technique called impasto, in which oil paint is applied on a board in thick layers with a palette knife to yield dynamism. He was also inspired by post-impressionism paintings, especially the pointillism of Georges Seurat's works. Klein's oil paintings were photographed and zoomed in to be used as reference in designing and choosing the colour compositions in his textiles.

=== Tulip 2, Bernat Klein, Oil on board (1962) ===
This oil painting inspired the design of a Tulip petals rug made for the carpet manufacturer Tomkinsons, Kidderminster, England.

=== Seascape, Bernat Klein, Oil on board (1963) ===
The painting is based on an aerial view of the sea swirling over rocks in the Italian coast. Its blue and green hues are reflected in a velvet, mohair and wool coat and dress made in 1964, which belonged to Margaret Klein.

=== Autumn Trees, Bernat Klein, Oil on linen canvas (1964) ===
The painting was inspired by the seasonal conditions and colours of the Scottish landscape.

=== Highland Pool, Bernat Klein for Dovecot Studios, Woven Tapestry, cotton and wool (1971) ===
Klein commissioned Dovecot Studios to produce ten tapestries based on magnified sections of his impasto oil paintings. The studio weavers employed innovative techniques to capture the three-dimensional texture of his paintings.

== Home and Studio ==
The Klein Studio in the Scottish Borders was designed by Peter Womersley and was completed in 1972. It has been described as a "workspace for design, weaving, exhibiting samples and business meetings". It won a RIBA award in 1973, and was shortlisted in the Museum and Heritage Awards in 2026. It was bought in 2025 by a consortium of the Scottish Historic Buildings Trust, the National Trust for Scotland and the Bernat Klein Foundation after falling into disrepair.

Klein's daughter, Shelly, wrote about her experience of growing up there.
