= Borders College =

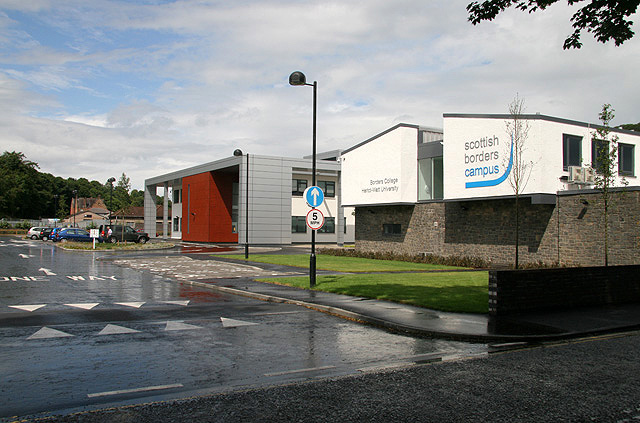
- Type: College of Further Education
- Established: 1984
- Principal: Pete Smith
- Location: Galashiels, Scottish Borders, Scotland; 55.608°N 2.784°W
- Website: http://www.borderscollege.ac.uk/

Borders College is a further education institution in the Scottish Borders, Scotland. Its main campus is located in Galashiels. Additionally, the college maintains secondary campuses at Hawick, Tweedbank and Newtown St. Boswells. The college was founded in 1984, by a merger of four pre-existing institutions: the Agricultural Centre at Newtown St. Boswells, Duns Agricultural Centre, Galashiels Technical College, and Henderson Technical College. The Galashiels campus has a Technology Enhanced Care Hub and the Hawick campus has a Science, Technology, Engineering and Maths (STEM) Hub.

Borders College former Principals: Angela Cox (30/01/2017 – 4/09/2022). Elizabeth Anne McIntyre (14/08/2006 – 04/12/2016). Dr Robert Boyd Murray (01/04/1997 – 02/08/2006). Robert Campbell Pearson (16/8/1980 – 31/03/1997).

== Honorary fellows ==
Borders College has appointed the following honorary fellows:

Year	Honorary fellow
2025	Bruce Aitchison
2024	Katie Scott
2023	Chris Ball
2022	Jodie Millar
2021	Virginia Grant
2020	Ross Dickinson
2019	Nick Bannerman
2018	Doddie Weir OBE
2017	David Stevenson CBE
2016	Wilma Gunn MBE
2015	Rosamund de la Hey
2014	Catherine Maxwell Stuart
2013	Chris Paterson MBE
2012	Andrew Grant
2011	John Collins
2010	John Alistair Buchan
2009	Gregor Townsend
2008	David A. G. Kilshaw OBE
2007	Ian Stark OBE
2006	Tony Taylor OBE
2005	Bob Kay CBE
2004	Jill Douglas
2003	Andrew L. Tulley MBE JP
2002	Sir David Steel
2001	Sir Archy Kirkwood
2000	Barbara Baker
1999	John Cleland
1998	Keith Geddes CBE
