= Patrick Fraser, Lord Fraser =

Scottish judge and legal scholar

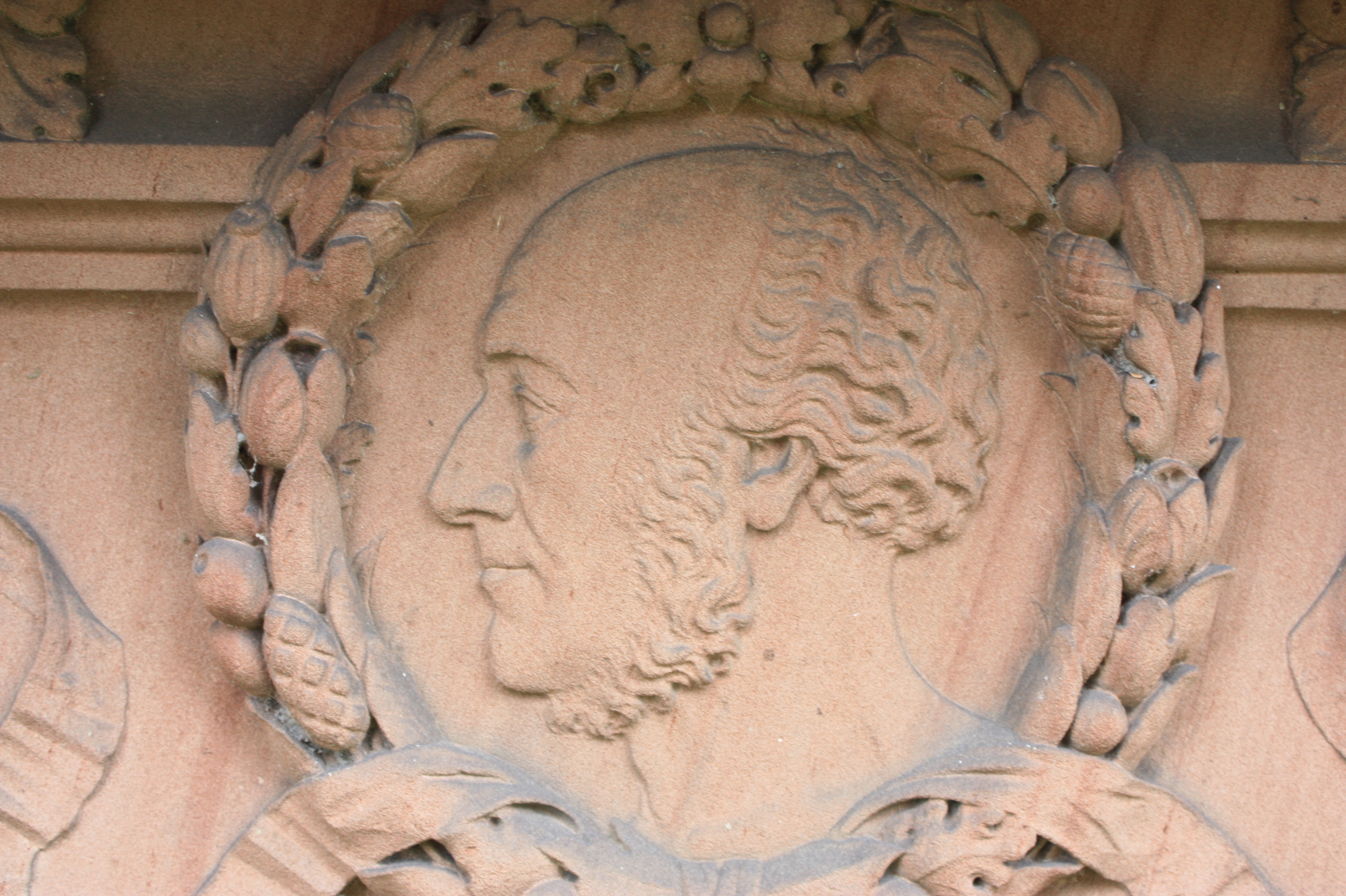
Sir Patrick Fraser

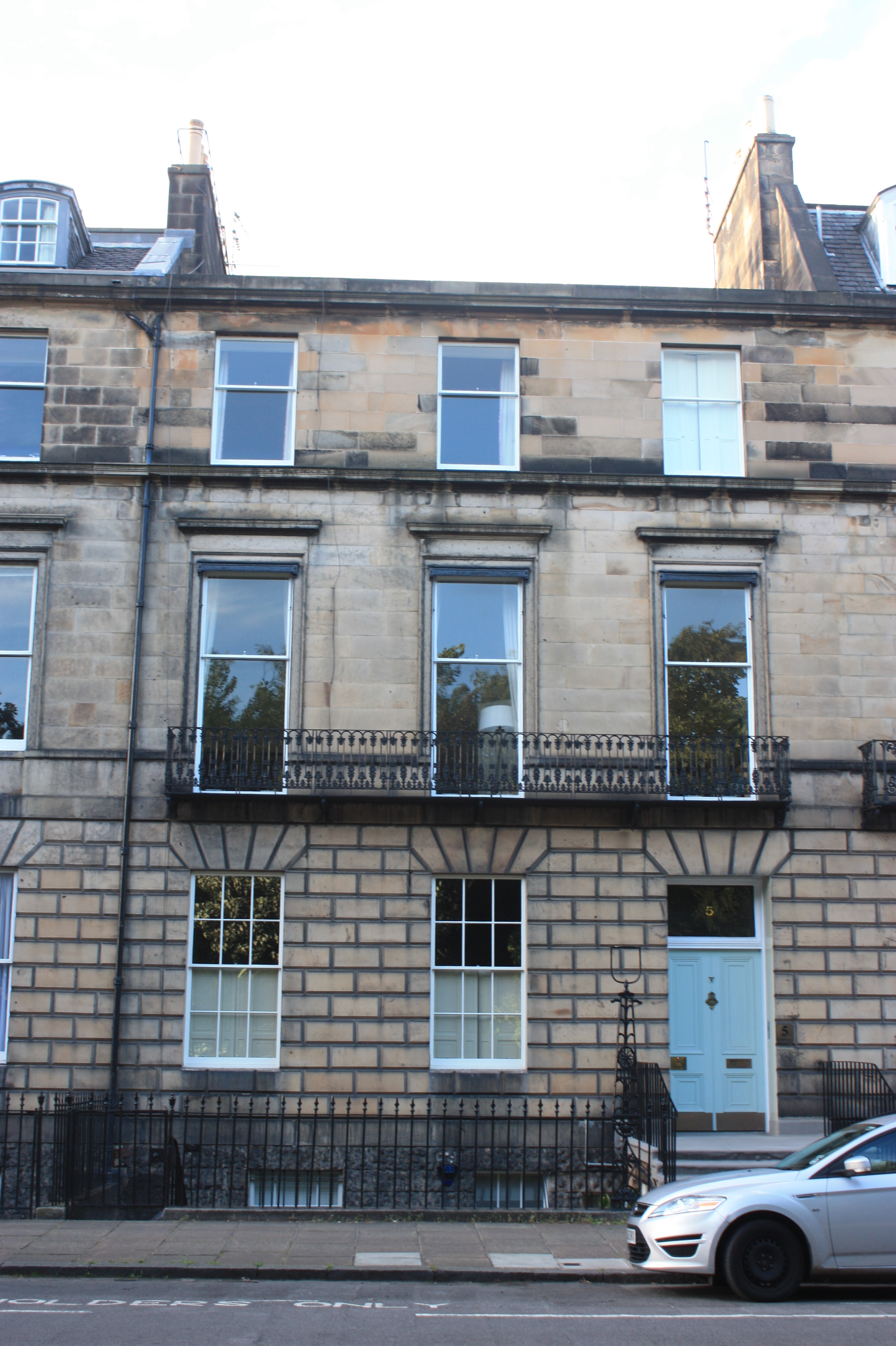
5 Heriot Row, Edinburgh

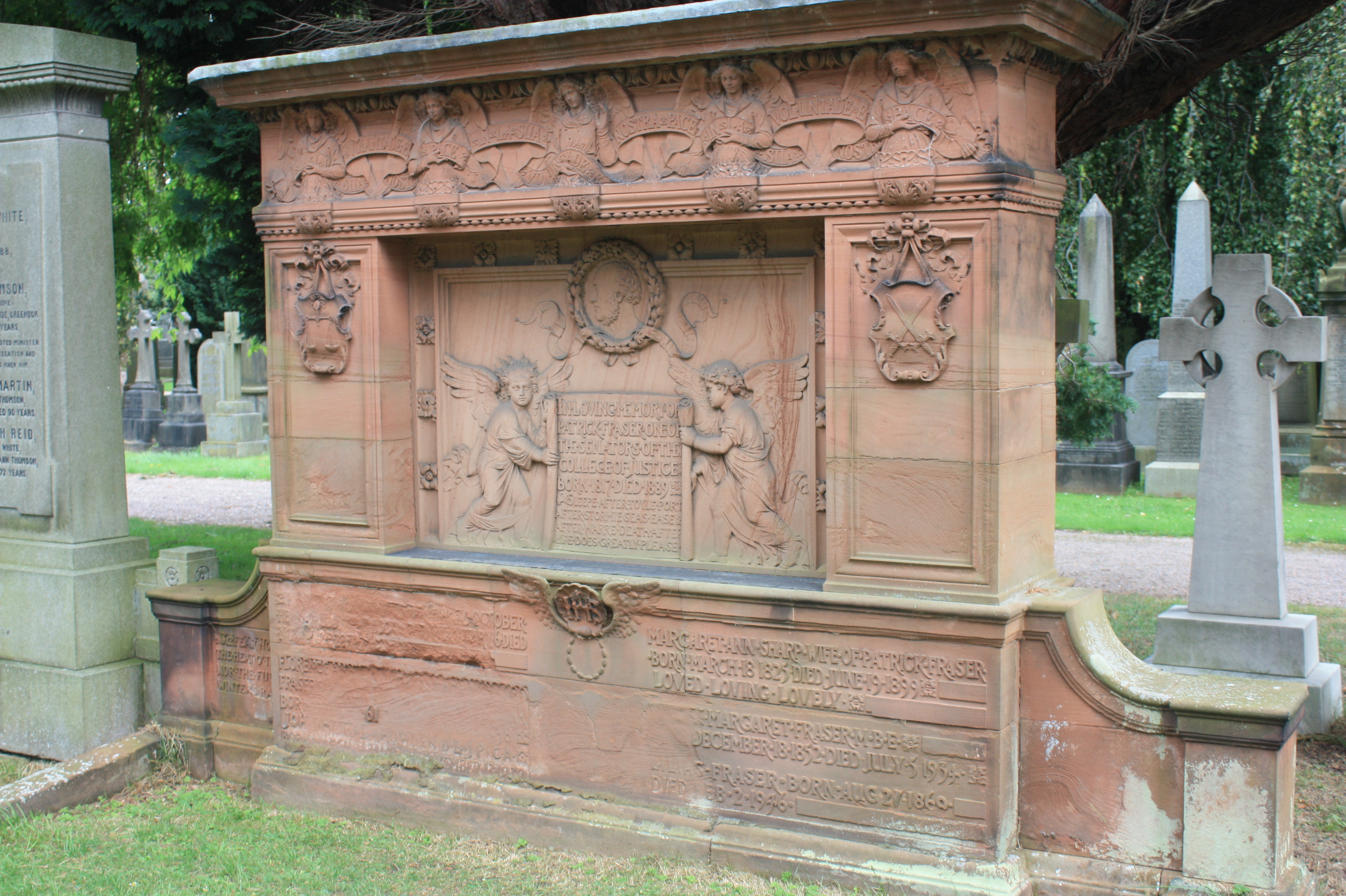
Grave of Sir Patrick Fraser, Dean Cemetery

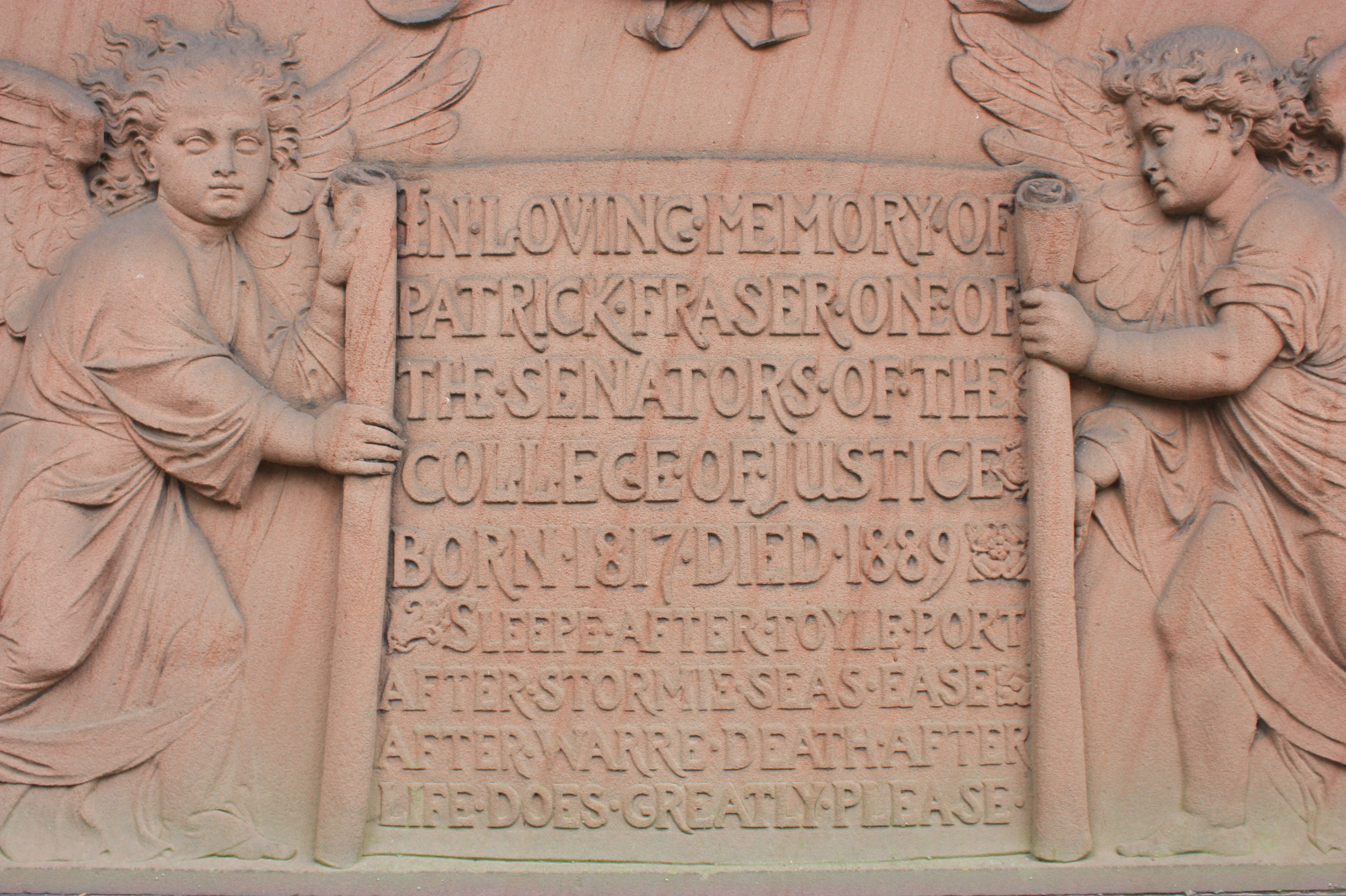
The grave of Patrick Fraser (detail)

Patrick Fraser, Lord Fraser LLD (1817–1889) was a Scottish judge and legal scholar.

== Life ==
He was born in Perth in 1819 the son of Patrick Fraser, a merchant.

After studies at Perth Grammar School and then studying law at the University of St Andrews, he was admitted to the bar of the Court of Session in 1843, where he participated in some of the most prominent cases of his time. In 1864 he was made Sheriff of Renfrewshire. The University of Edinburgh awarded him an honorary doctorate (LLD) in 1871 for his historical research. Following the resignation of Lord Gifford due to ill-health, Fraser became a Lord of Session, and was given the title Lord Fraser.

He served as Dean of the Faculty of Advocates from 1878 to 1881 and was created Queen's Counsel in 1880. In Edinburgh he lived at 5 Heriot Row in the New Town.

Fraser published widely in the area of commercial and family law. He was among those who established the tradition of scientific monographs treating specific questions of law from a critical historical and philosophical point of view.

He died at Gattonside House near Melrose on 27 March 1889. He is buried in Dean Cemetery on the south side of one of the north paths in the original cemetery, towards the west end.

== Family ==
He married Margaret Ann Sharp, daughter of a Birmingham merchant. They had one son and four daughters.

== Publications ==
- A Treatise on the Law of Scotland as applicable to Personal and Domestic Relationships (1846)
- Tytler's History of Scotland Examined (1848)
- Domestic Economy, Gymnastics and Music (1855)
- The Conflict of Laws in Cases of Divorce (1860)
- A Sketch of the Career of Duncan Forbes of Culloden (1875)
- A treatise on Husband and Wife, according to the Law of Scotland (1876)
- Treatise on Master and Servant, Employer and Workman, and Master and Apprentice according to the Law of Scotland (1882)
