= Lunacy (Scotland) Act 1857 =

Act of the Parliament of the United Kingdom

Lunacy (Scotland) Act 1857 (Note: The citation of this act by this short title was authorised by section 1 of, and the first schedule to, the Short Titles Act 1896. Due to the repeal of those provisions it is now authorised by section 19(2) of the Interpretation Act 1978.)
- Act of Parliament
- Parliament of the United Kingdom
- Long title: An Act for the Regulation of the Care and Treatment of Lunatics, and for the Provision, Maintenance and Regulation of Lunatic Asylums in Scotland.
- Citation: 20 & 21 Vict. c. 71
- Territorial extent: United Kingdom

Dates
- Royal assent: 25 August 1857
- Commencement: 1 January 1858 (Note: Section 1.)
- Repealed: 1 January 1961 (Note: The Mental Health (Scotland) Act, 1960 (Appointed Day) Order 1960 (SI 1960/2296).)
Other legislation
Amends	Poor Law (Scotland) Act 1845
Repeals/revokes	Madhouses (Scotland) Act 1815; Madhouses (Scotland) Act 1828; Madhouses, etc. (Scotland) Act 1841
Amended by	Statute Law Revision Act 1875; Local Government (Scotland) Act 1947; Statute Law Revision Act 1950
Repealed by	Mental Health (Scotland) Act 1960

Status: Repealed

Text of statute as originally enacted

The Lunacy (Scotland) Act 1857 (20 & 21 Vict. c. 71) was an act of the Parliament of the United Kingdom that formed mental health law in Scotland from 1857 until 1913.

== Background ==
Prior to the act, lunacy legislation in Scotland was enshrined in the Madhouses (Scotland) Act 1815 which established the right of Scottish Sheriffs to order the inspection of madhouses. However the Scottish Lunacy Commission inquiry which reported in 1857 found that the official oversight of mental health institutions "remained at best variable and at worst simply inadequate". It recommended the formation of a "Scottish Lunacy Board" who would address the shortfall in oversight.

== Provisions ==
The legislation created a General Board of Commissioners in Lunacy for Scotland. It also created district boards with the power to establish and operate publicly funded "district asylums" for patients who could not afford the fees charged by existing private and charitable "Royal Asylums". These existing "Royal Asylums" (with royal charters) included the Aberdeen Royal Lunatic Asylum, the Crichton Royal Institution, the Dundee Royal Lunatic Asylum, the Royal Edinburgh Lunatic Asylum, the Glasgow Royal Lunatic Asylum, the Montrose Royal Lunatic Asylum and James Murray's Royal Lunatic Asylum. The aim of the legislation was to establish a network of "district asylums" with coverage throughout Scotland.

== Subsequent legislation ==
Under the Mental Deficiency and Lunacy (Scotland) Act 1913, the General Board of Commissioners in Lunacy for Scotland was reconstructed and designated the General Board of Control for Scotland.

Section 84, so far as unrepealed, was repealed by section 1(1) of, and the first schedule to, the Statute Law Revision Act 1950 (14 Geo. 6. c. 6), which came into force on 23 May 1950.

The whole act was repealed by section 113(2) of, and the fifth schedule to, the Mental Health (Scotland) Act 1960 (8 & 9 Eliz. 2. c. 61), which came into force on 1 January 1961.

== See also ==
- List of asylums commissioned in Scotland

== Bibliography ==
- Keane, A. M. (1987). "Mental Health Policy in Scotland, 1908-1960" (PDF). University of Edinburgh.
