= Council Headquarters, Newtown St Boswells =

County building in Newtown St Boswells, Scotland

Council Headquarters
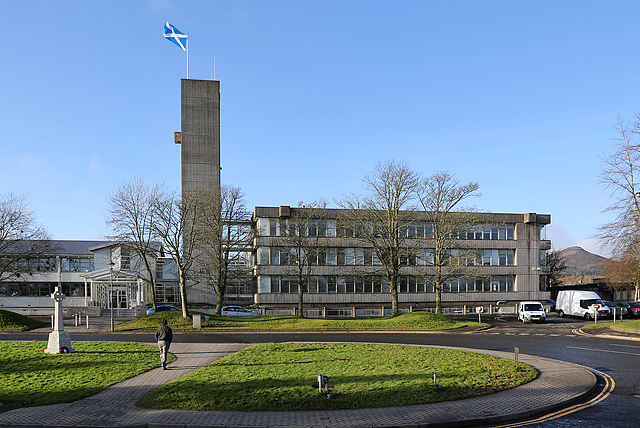

- Location within Scottish Borders
- 55.57752°N 2.67353°W
- Location: Bowden Road; Newtown St Boswells; Melrose; TD6 0SA

Site notes
- Architect: Peter Womersley

The Council Headquarters is a municipal building in Newtown St Boswells, in the Scottish Borders council area in Scotland. It serves as the headquarters of Scottish Borders Council.

Roxburghshire County Council built the first office on the site in 1896. The site later became that council's headquarters and meeting place in 1930, known as the "County Offices". A substantial new building was added in 1968, which forms the main part of the current building. Following local government reform in 1975 the building became the headquarters of the Borders Regional Council and was renamed "Regional Headquarters". When local government was reorganised again in 1996 the building became the headquarters of Scottish Borders Council and was renamed "Council Headquarters".

== History ==
The Roxburghshire Commissioners of Supply served as the main administrative body for Roxburghshire from 1667 until 1890, when the county council was created and took over most of the commissioners' functions. The commissioners met at Jedburgh, which had become the county town after the original county town at Roxburgh had been abandoned following the destruction of Roxburgh Castle in 1460 during the Anglo-Scottish Wars. In 1812, County Buildings was built at the junction of Market Place and Castlegate in Jedburgh, serving as both a sheriff court and meeting place for the commissioners.

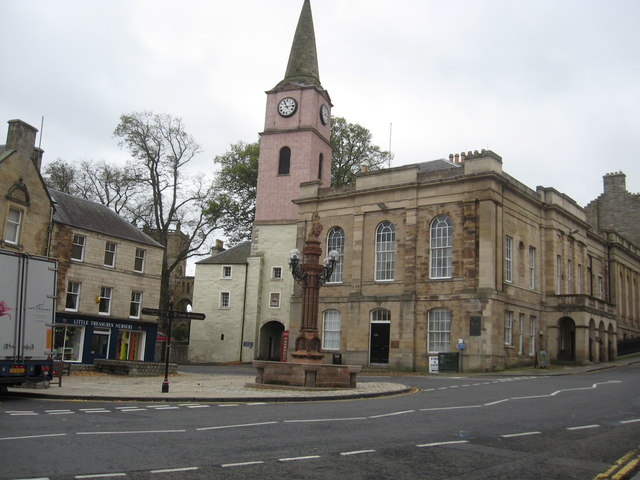
County Buildings, Castlegate, Jedburgh

Roxburghshire County Council was created in 1890 under the Local Government (Scotland) Act 1889, which established elected county councils in Scotland. The council held its first meeting on 22 May 1890 at the County Buildings in Jedburgh. At that meeting the question of where the council should meet was debated, with some arguing that Newtown St Boswells would be a better location, as St Boswells railway station was a junction with direct services to all parts of the county, whereas Jedburgh railway station was on a minor branch line and harder to reach from much of the county, despite being more central. A vote was taken, with 21 in favour of meeting at Jedburgh and 12 in favour of Newtown St Boswells. Full council meetings were therefore held at the County Buildings in Jedburgh.

Despite choosing to meet in Jedburgh, the council did recognise the advantages of Newtown St Boswells for those members of the council's staff who needed to travel around the county. In 1896 the council feued land from the Duke of Buccleuch on Bowden Road, opposite St Boswells station, and built a small building there called the County Rooms, containing rooms for the medical officer, sanitary inspector, and secretary, as well as a laboratory and a board room, which was used for committee meetings but not full council meetings.

In 1928 the Roxburghshire Education Authority, a separate body to the county council, built itself a headquarters immediately north of the County Rooms.

The county council's functions were significantly expanded in May 1930 under the Local Government (Scotland) Act 1929. It took over a range of services previously provided by the town councils of the county's burghs, and also took over the functions of the education authority, which was abolished. Prior to the 1930 reforms the council had employed a solicitor from Kelso as a part-time clerk and an accountant from Jedburgh as a part-time treasurer. After the reforms the council needed to employ many more full-time staff. Having inherited the 1928 education authority building next to County Rooms, it decided to base its new staff there, renaming the building County Offices. Full council meetings were still held at the County Buildings in Jedburgh, but with the council's staff and main offices being at Newtown St Boswells, the council decided in December 1930 by 26 votes to 15 to move its meeting place to the County Offices at Newtown St Boswells, enlarging an existing meeting room there to become a council chamber. Some councillors opposed the move, observing that the railway accessibility of Newtown St Boswells was less relevant given that 75% of the councillors had cars. However, the prevailing view was that as the council already owned offices at Newtown St Boswells, moving meetings there was the most cost efficient way of bringing the council's meeting place and main offices together.

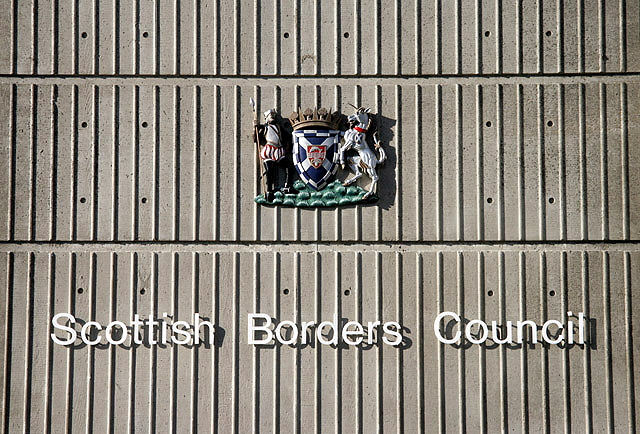
The council's name and coat of arms on the exterior of the service tower.

In 1960 the council decided it needed larger premises. A competition was held to design a new building, which was won by Peter Womersley. The design is a brutalist building of grey shuttered concrete, comprising a four-storey square block of offices around a central courtyard with a prominent concrete service tower to one side. The new building was built between 1966 and 1968 on a site immediately north-east of the 1928 building, to which it was linked.

The 1896 County Rooms were demolished to make way for a car park. The 1928 building remains in place, but subsequent extensions have almost completely hidden it from public viewpoints.

Roxburghshire County Council was abolished in 1975, when local government in Scotland was reorganised into upper-tier regions and lower-tier districts. Roxburghshire became part of the Borders region. At district level most of Roxburghshire went to the Roxburgh district, but Newtown St Boswells became part of the Ettrick and Lauderdale district. The Borders Regional Council took over the County Offices in Newtown St Boswells, renaming the building "Regional Headquarters". Further local government reform in 1996 saw the region's four districts merge with the regional council to become a single tier authority. The reconstituted council renamed the area "Scottish Borders" and renamed the offices in Newtown St Boswells to "Council Headquarters".
