= Royal Alexandra Hospital, Paisley =

Royal Alexandra Hospital
- NHS Greater Glasgow and Clyde
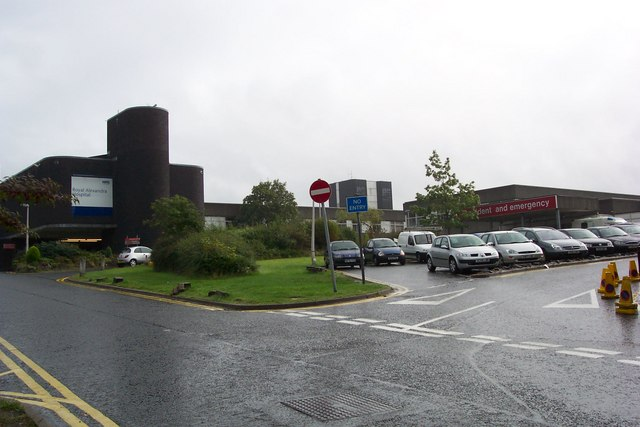
- Royal Alexandra Hospital in Craw Road

- Shown in Renfrewshire

Geography
- Location: Paisley, Renfrewshire, Scotland
- Coordinates: 55.835°N 4.438°W

Organisation
- Care system: NHS Scotland
- Type: General Hospital
- Affiliated university: University of Glasgow; University of the West of Scotland

Services
- Emergency department: Yes
- Beds: 760

History
- Founded: 1986

Links
- Website: Queen Elizabeth University Hospital
- Lists: Hospitals in Scotland

The Royal Alexandra Hospital (RAH) is the main hospital in Paisley serving a large catchment area stretching all the way to Oban and Argyll. The hospital is managed by NHS Greater Glasgow and Clyde.

== History ==
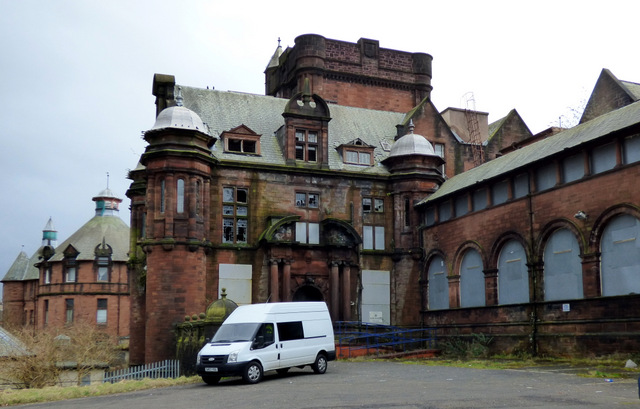
The old hospital at Calside

The hospital has its origins in a general dispensary in central Paisley which opened in 1786 and became a house of recovery in 1805. A new facility financed by William Barbour and designed by Thomas Graham Abercrombie was completed at Calside in July 1896.

In the early 1980s it was decided to create a modern hospital on the site of the old Riccartsbar Hospital in Craw Road and the new facility was officially opened by Princess Alexandra in May 1988.

The hospital received patients from the 2007 Glasgow Airport attack, including one of the suspects who was taken to the hospital under arrest with severe burns. Parts of the hospital were later evacuated when a suspect device, originally believed to be a suicide belt, was discovered on the suspect. On the afternoon of 1 July a controlled explosion of a car was carried out in the car park of the hospital.

The children's ward at the hospital closed in February 2018.

== Services ==
The hospital has 760 staffed beds. It contains the only consultant-led maternity unit for the upper Clyde area, after the maternity wards at Inverclyde Royal Hospital and Vale of Leven Hospital became midwife-led in 2003.

== See also ==
- List of listed buildings in Paisley, Renfrewshire
