= Gattonside =

Village in Scottish Borders, Scotland

Coordinates: 55.607°N 2.726°W

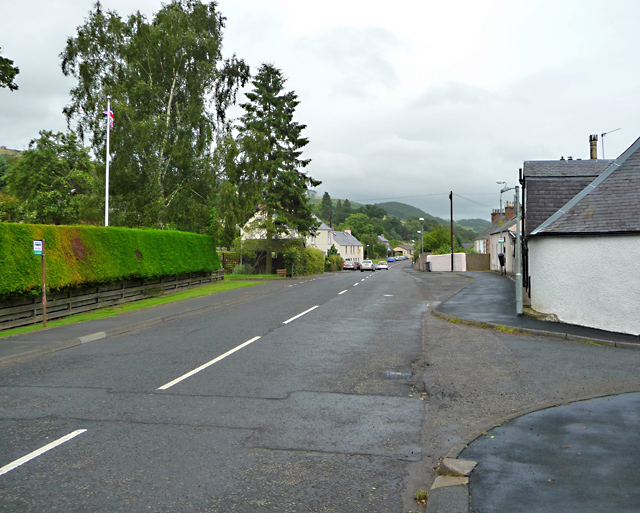
- The main road through Gattonside

- Location within the Scottish Borders
- Population: 381 (2001)
- OS grid reference: NT544350
  - Edinburgh: 30 mi (48 km) NW
  - London: 303 mi (488 km) SE
- Civil parish: Melrose
- Community council: Melrose and District
- Council area: Scottish Borders
- Lieutenancy area: Roxburgh, Ettrick and Lauderdale
- Country: Scotland
- Sovereign state: United Kingdom
- Post town: MELROSE
- Postcode district: TD6
- Dialling code: 01896
- Police: Scotland
- Fire: Scottish
- Ambulance: Scottish
- UK Parliament: Berwickshire, Roxburgh and Selkirk
- Scottish Parliament: Midlothian South, Tweeddale and Lauderdale

Gattonside is a small village in the Scottish Borders. It is located 1 kilometre (0.62 mi) north of Melrose, on the north side of the River Tweed. In 1143, the lands of Gattonside were granted to the monks of Melrose Abbey by David I of Scotland.

Modernist architect Peter Womersley lived in Gattonside at his self-designed house, The Rig, completed in 1957. The Rig was designated as a Category B listed building on 17 April 2007 as a "fine example of domestic house built by Peter Womersley".

The village is linked to Melrose, on the opposite side of the River Tweed, by the 19th-century Gattonside Suspension Bridge, built in 1826. The plantation owner, Robert Waugh of Harmony Hall was a shareholder who on his death in 1832 left his shares to the poor of Melrose. The bridge was designated as a Category A listed building on 15 March 1971. Its listing was amended to Category B in 1998.

== Gattonside House ==
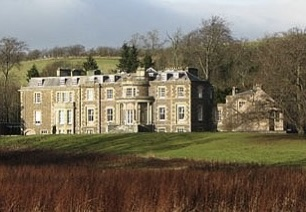
Gattonside House in 2008.

Gattonside House is a 19th-century country house in Gattonside, built between c.1808–1811 in the Classical style. The earliest recorded owner is James Brown (d. 1816), owner of a Jamaican coffee plantation. The house was occupied between 1821 and 1824 by Sir Adam Ferguson, Deputy Keeper of the Scottish Regalia and close friend of Sir Walter Scott. The following owner of the property, retired banker George Bainbridge (c.1788–1839), employed local architect John Smith to enlarge it. Following Bainbridge's death in 1839, the house had a number of occupiers, and from around the early 1890s appears to have been leased to tenants by Henry Mungall (c.1843–1911), a local provost and manager of the Fife Coal Company. On Mungall's death, the property was sold to Edward Ebsworth (c.1848–1915) who commissioned Robert Lorimer to extend and alter it. The house was sold by Ebsworth's relatives in the 1920s, following which it was owned by Captain Francis Montgomerie (1887–1950), younger son of the Earl of Eglinton and Winton, whose family left in 1951. Following a brief period of occupation by John Morgan, the property was bought by the Brothers of Charity, who ran the house as St. Aidan's Care Home for the Mentally Handicapped from 1953 until 2009. From the institute's departure in 2009, the property fell into a state of disrepair, and as of 2024 it was estimated that replacing the damaged roof alone would cost £850,000. In 2025, the property was bought by Fortis Homes, a development firm, which announced plans to convert the house into apartments, and use its grounds to build new housing. The house was designated as a Category B listed building on 15 March 1971 as "a well-detailed early 19th-century Classical villa".

== Notable residents ==
- Neil Murray, bassist who was born in Gattonside.
- Peter Womersley, architect who lived at his self-designed Gattonside house, The Rig.

=== Residents at Gattonside House ===
- Sir Adam Ferguson, Deputy Keeper of the Scottish Regalia.
- General Alexander Duncan, officer of the East India Company army in Bengal.
- Patrick Fraser, Lord Fraser, Senior Lord-Ordinary of Edinburgh Court of Session.
- Captain George Swinton, politician.
- John Morgan, 6th Baron Tredegar, peer and landowner.

== Gallery ==
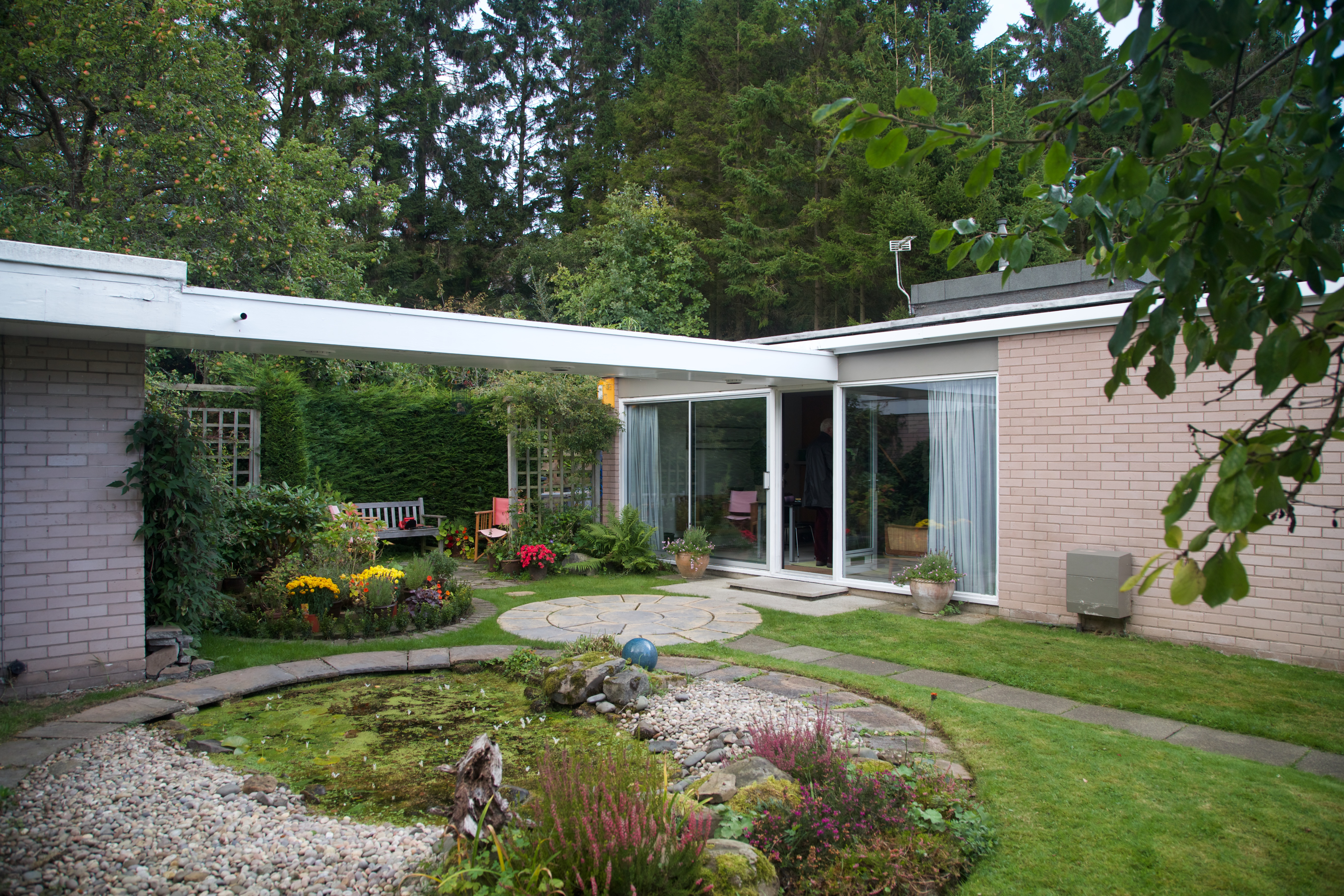
Peter Womersley's self-designed home, The Rig, 2016.

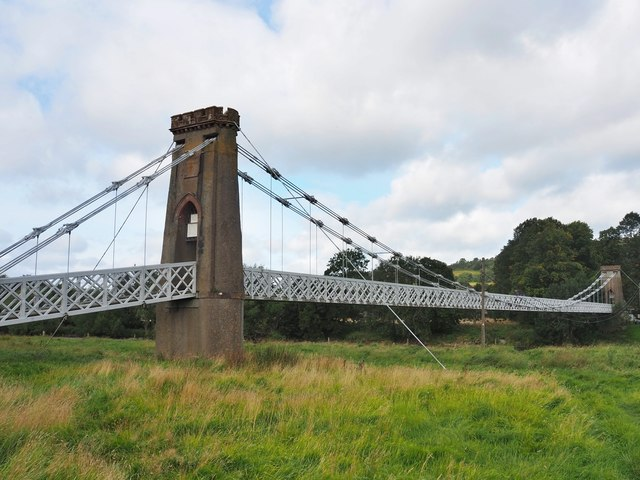
Gattonside Suspension Bridge in 2020.
