= Riccartsbar Hospital =

Former mental health hospital in Scotland

- Shown in Renfrewshire

Geography
- Location: Paisley, Renfrewshire, Scotland
- Coordinates: 55.835°N 4.438°W

Organisation
- Care system: NHS Scotland
- Type: Psychiatric hospital

Services
- Emergency department: No

History
- Founded: 1876
- Closed: 1975

Links
- Lists: Hospitals in Scotland

Riccartsbar Hospital was a mental health facility in Paisley, Renfrewshire, Scotland.

== History ==
The hospital, which was designed by John Honeyman, opened as the Paisley District Asylum in June 1876. The hospital went into a period of decline and, after patients had been transferred to Dykebar Hospital, Riccartsbar Hospital closed in 1975. The buildings were subsequently demolished to make way for the Royal Alexandra Hospital.
