= Bilbohall Hospital =

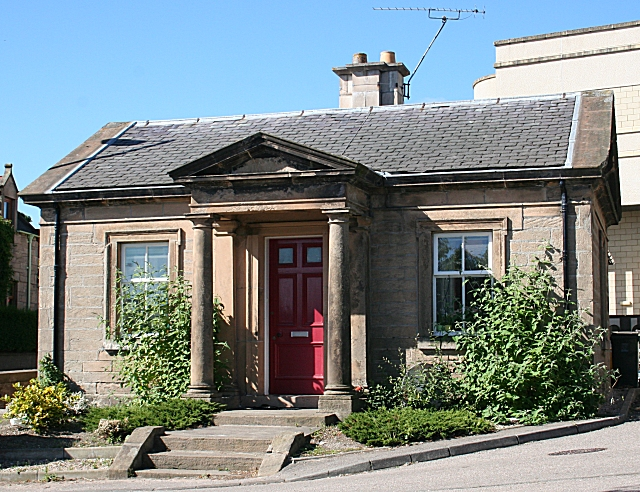
- Surviving lodge to the Bilbohall Hospital (the hospital was demolished in the late 1990s)

- Shown in Moray

Geography
- Location: Elgin, Moray, Scotland
- Coordinates: 57.64537°N 3.33300°W

Organisation
- Care system: NHS Scotland
- Type: Psychiatric hospital

Services
- Emergency department: No

History
- Founded: 1835
- Closed: 1995

Links
- Lists: Hospitals in Scotland

Bilbohall Hospital was a mental health facility located to the west of Dr Gray's Hospital in Elgin, Scotland.

== History ==
The hospital, which was designed by Archibald Simpson, opened as the Elgin District Asylum in 1835. It was extended by A & W Reid in the 1860s and a third storey was added in the 1880s. It became the Morayshire Mental Hospital in the 1920s and joined the National Health Service as Bilbohall Hospital in 1948. After the introduction of Care in the Community in the early 1980s, the hospital went into a period of decline and closed in April 1995. The buildings were demolished in the late 1990s.
