= Dingleton Hospital =

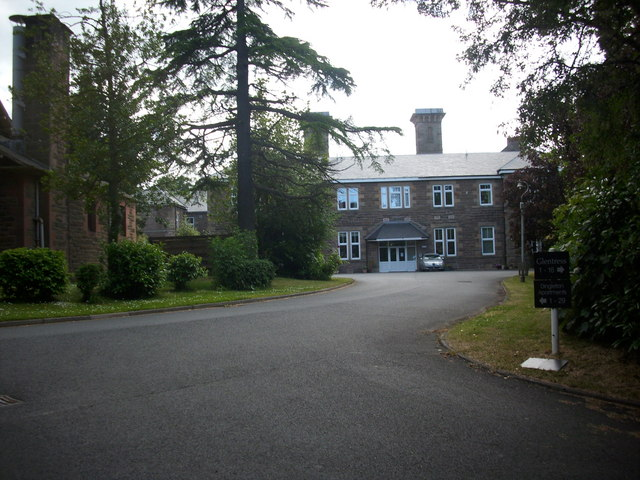
- The former Dingleton Hospital

- Shown in the Scottish Borders

Geography
- Location: Melrose, Scottish Borders, Scotland
- Coordinates: 55.5906°N 2.7289°W

Organisation
- Care system: NHS Scotland
- Type: Psychiatric hospital

Services
- Emergency department: No

History
- Founded: 1872
- Closed: 2001

Links
- Lists: Hospitals in Scotland

Dingleton Hospital was a mental health facility in Melrose, Scotland. The former boiler house is a Category B listed building.

== History ==
The hospital, which was designed by Brown & Wardrop, opened as the Roxburgh, Berwick and Selkirk District Asylum in May 1872. A new female hospital block was completed in 1898 and two new wings, designed by Sydney Mitchell and Wilson, were completed in 1906. The facility joined the National Health Service as Dingleton Hospital in 1948. A monolithic concrete boiler house, designed by Peter Womersley, which still dominates the local skyline, was completed in 1977.

After the introduction of Care in the Community in the early 1980s, the hospital went into a period of decline and closed in 2001. The main building has since been converted for residential use as "Dingleton Apartments" within a wider housing development across the former hospital site known as "Trimontium Heights".
