= Newtown St Boswells =

Coordinates: 55.576°N 2.674°W

Newtown St Boswells: Scottish Gaelic: Baile Ùr Bhoisil; Scots: Newtoon
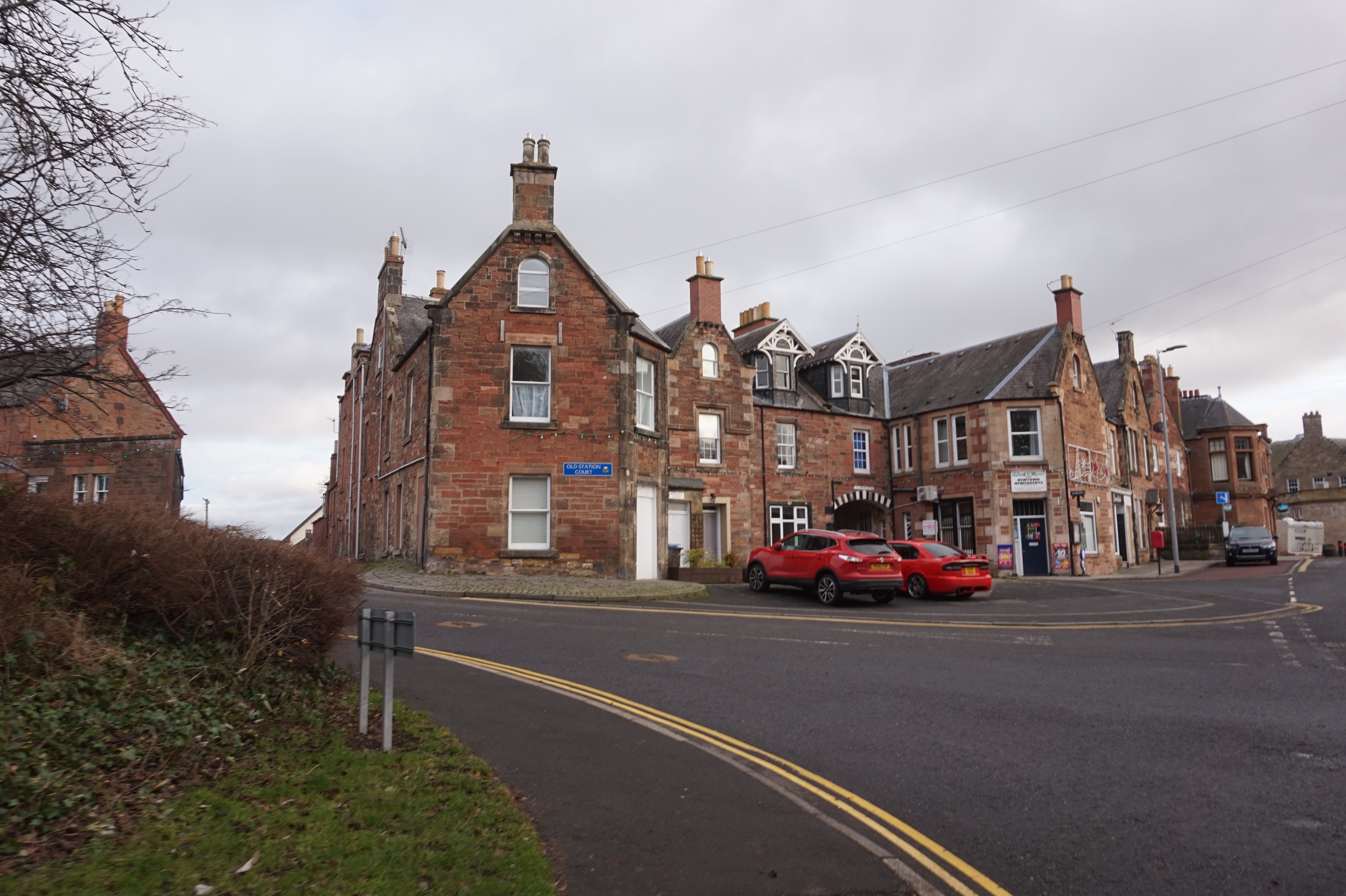
- Old Station Court, formerly the location of St. Boswells railway station

- Location within the Scottish Borders
- Area: 1.37 km^{2} (0.53 sq mi)
- Population: 1,470 (2020)
  - Density: 1,073/km^{2} (2,780/sq mi)
- OS grid reference: NT576316
  - Edinburgh: 33 mi (53 km) NW
- Civil parish: Melrose; St Boswells
- Community council: Newtown and Eildon
- Council area: Scottish Borders
- Lieutenancy area: Roxburgh, Ettrick and Lauderdale
- Country: Scotland
- Sovereign state: United Kingdom
- Post town: MELROSE
- Postcode district: TD6
- Dialling code: 01835
- Police: Scotland
- Fire: Scottish
- Ambulance: Scottish
- UK Parliament: Berwickshire, Roxburgh and Selkirk
- Scottish Parliament: Ettrick, Roxburgh and Berwickshire

Newtown St Boswells (Scots: Newtoon; Scottish Gaelic: Baile Ùr Bhoisil [ˈpaləˈuːɾˈvɔʃɪl]) is a village in the Scottish Borders council area, in south-east Scotland. The village lies south of the Eildon Hills on the Sprouston and Newtown burns, approximately 40 miles (64 km) south-east of Edinburgh. It is the administrative centre of the Scottish Borders, and was historically in the county of Roxburghshire.

== History ==
Newtown St Boswells is an old settlement, well-established by the 16th century. The town has been known at various times as Newtoun, Newton, Newtown of Eildon and Newtown of Dryburgh. It lies split between the civil parishes of Melrose and St Boswells.

Historically, Newtown St Boswells was a centre for milling grain, with watermills on its burns. In the 19th century, the development of the railway made the village a regional centre for transporting agricultural produce and livestock, with St Boswells station becoming a large junction station with facilities for loading cattle. The railway closed in 1968.

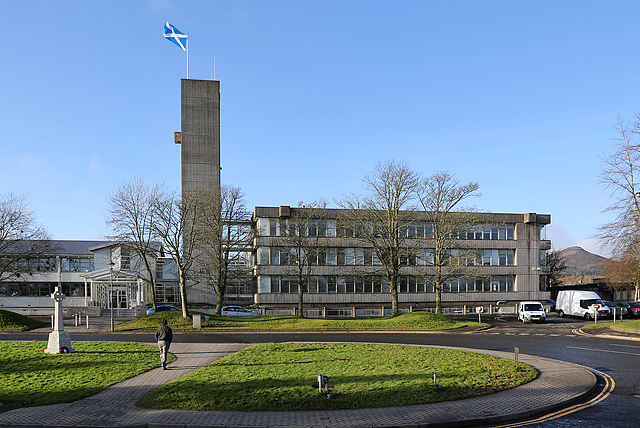
Scottish Borders Council Headquarters

Roxburghshire County Council established offices at Newtown St Boswells in 1896, and subsequently moved its meeting place there from Jedburgh in 1930. A large new building was added to the site in 1968. From 1975 to 1996, the offices served as the administrative centre for Borders Regional Council. Since the 1996 the offices have been the headquarters of Scottish Borders Council and known as the Council Headquarters.

== Education ==
The village is served by Newtown Primary School, which is a feeder school to Earlston High School, about 5 miles (8.0 km) away in Earlston. The primary school also has nursery provision for preschool-aged children. A Borders College campus at the southeastern tip of the village specialises in agricultural education.
