= Herdmanflat Hospital =

- NHS Lothian
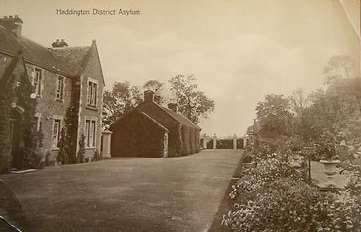
- East Lothian District Asylum

- Shown in East Lothian

Geography
- Location: Haddington, Scotland
- Coordinates: 55.95999°N 2.78672°W

Organisation
- Care system: NHS Scotland
- Type: Psychiatric hospital

History
- Founded: 1866

Links
- Other links: List of hospitals in Scotland

Herdmanflat Hospital was a psychiatric hospital in Aberlady Road, Haddington, Scotland. It was operated by NHS Lothian.

== History ==
The hospital was located at a site which was once known as Herdmanflat Farm. The facility was designed by Peddie and Kinnear and opened as the East Lothian District Asylum in 1866. A dining hall was added in 1890 and several villas were added in 1908. It joined the National Health Service in 1948.

After the Garleton Unit at Herdmanflat Hospital had been upgraded at a cost of £250,000, mental health services transferred from Edenhall Hospital in Musselburgh. This created a "one-stop shop for older people's mental health services" for the whole of East Lothian at Herdmanflat Hospital.

In 2014 NHS Lothian proposed creating a community hospital on the site of the old Roodlands General Hospital. After all services moved to the new East Lothian Community Hospital, the Herdmanflat Hospital closed in 2020.
